= National Education League =

The National Education League was a political movement in England and Wales which promoted elementary education for all children, free from religious control. It was founded in 1869 and dissolved in 1877. It developed from the Birmingham Education League, co-founded in 1867 by George Dixon, a Birmingham Member of Parliament (MP) and past mayor, Joseph Chamberlain, a nonconformist and future mayor of Birmingham, and Jesse Collings, but was expanded to include branches from all over England and Wales. Dixon was chairman of the League's council, Chamberlain chairman of the executive committee, and Collings the honorary secretary. Other leading founding members (all in Birmingham) were R. W. Dale, A. Follett Osler, J. H. Chamberlain, George Dawson, and William Harris. Twenty founding members subscribed £14,000. The first general meeting was in October 1869, by which time William Dronfield of Sheffield was acting as Secretary. It resolved that a bill should be prepared to present to Parliament at the next session.

The League was opposed by the National Educational Union of Manchester, consisting of Conservatives and Anglicans.

Dixon and Chamberlain were campaigners for the provision of non-sectarian education free of influence by the churches. The Anglicans and Catholic Churches were in control of most of the existing voluntary schools, and controlled the religious education of those who attended. The Liberals and Dissenters wanted compulsory education without religious doctrine.

In the end, the Elementary Education Act 1870 (33 & 34 Vict. c. 75), which created school boards, was a compromise filling in the gaps of the voluntary system. The League continued campaigning for eight years for adoption of their original requirements, before being dissolved in 1877.

== Objectives ==
Each of the League's documents included their objectives:

Object

The establishment of a system which shall secure the education of every child in the country.

Means

1. Local authorities shall be compelled by law to see that sufficient school accommodation is provided for every child in their district.
2. The cost of founding, and maintaining such schools as may be required shall be provided out of local rates, supplemented by government grants.
3. All schools aided by local rates shall be under the management of local authorities and subject to government inspection.
4. All schools aided by local rates shall be unsectarian.
5. To all schools aided by local rates admission shall be free.
6. School accommodation being provided, the state or the local authorities shall have power to compel the attendance of children of suitable age not otherwise receiving education.

== See also ==
- Career and technical education
- Education
- Elementary Education Act 1870
