= Church of the Saviour, Birmingham =

Church in West Midlands, England

Coordinates: 52.4819°N 1.9113°W

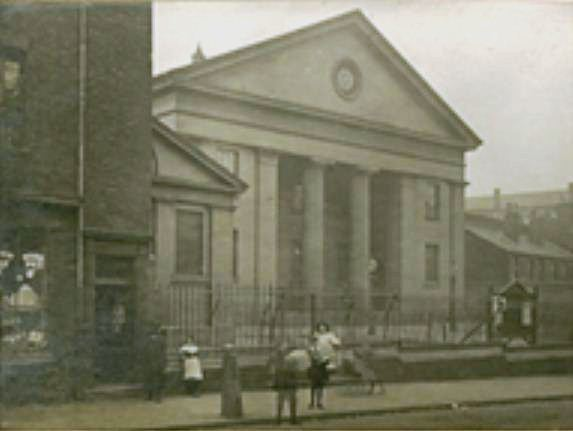
The Church of the Saviour

The Church of the Saviour in Edward Street, Birmingham, was a liberal Unitarian church founded in 1845 for the liberal nonconformist preacher, George Dawson. It became the centre of the programme of social and municipal improvement known as the Civic Gospel, and was instrumental in launching Joseph Chamberlain's political career.

== Founding ==
Dawson was originally a Baptist pastor in the rapidly expanding industrial town of Birmingham, to which he moved in 1844 to become minister of the Mount Zion Baptist Chapel. The eloquence and beliefs that the young man expressed soon attracted a large following.

However, Dawson's views did not fit the orthodoxy of the Baptist church, so in 1845 he left, followed by much of his congregation, to become minister of the theologically liberal Church of the Saviour, a "Free Christian" church erected for him by his supporters, where "no pledge was required, of minister or congregation; no form of belief was implied by membership; no difference in creed was allowed to bar union in practical Christian work". The new church building was formally opened on 8 August 1847. Its interior was modelled on a lecture theatre in the University of London, with benches instead of pews, and a platform instead of a pulpit.

The key doctrine preached there was inscribed on a marble tablet above the entrance: "There is but one law – thou shalt love the Lord thy God with all thy heart, and thy neighbour as thyself."

== Civic Gospel ==
In the Church of the Saviour, Dawson developed the concept of the Civic Gospel. He called upon his congregation to join him in the struggle "to improve conditions in the town and the quality of life enjoyed by its citizens". His sermons were unconventional for the time. It was said that Dawson "preached not as a dying man to dying men – that was the old idea of preaching – but as a living man to living men who found life no simple or easy matter". His sermons galvanised the Birmingham public, and influential members of his Church, all of whom took on his ideals and went on to play important roles in local affairs, included Joseph Chamberlain (who took Sunday School and oversaw the accounts), Jesse Collings, George Dixon, J. T. Bunce, J. A. Langford, Robert Martineau, Samuel Timmins, William Harris, and the Kenrick family. Between 1847 and 1867, 17 members of the congregation were elected to the Town Council, six of whom were elected mayor. From his pulpit and in public lectures and articles, Dawson advised Christians (particularly people experienced in business) to become councillors and help transform the city, a call which Joseph Chamberlain answered in his work first as councillor, and then as a visionary social reforming mayor.

== Organ ==
The organ was installed in 1847 and built by Gray and Davison. It had been constructed for the Berkshire Musical Festival held in the Town Hall, Reading. It consisted of two manuals and pedals with 16 speaking stops. It was replaced in 1861 when on 25 January a new organ by John Banfield of Soho Hill, Birmingham was opened. It comprised three manuals and pedals and had 31 speaking stops.

=== Organists ===
- Andrew Deakin 1847–1878
- Stephen Samuel Stratton 1878–1882

== Closure ==
Dawson died in 1876, and Unitarians largely succeeded him as ministers of the Church of the Saviour. One of his assistants, George St Clair, became sole minister. However, in 1896 the church was sold to a Methodist congregation. The proceeds from the sale were donated to another Unitarian church in Waverley Road.

== Notable people ==
- Sarah Crompton (1802–1881), children's writer
