= William Harris (Birmingham Liberal) =

British politician

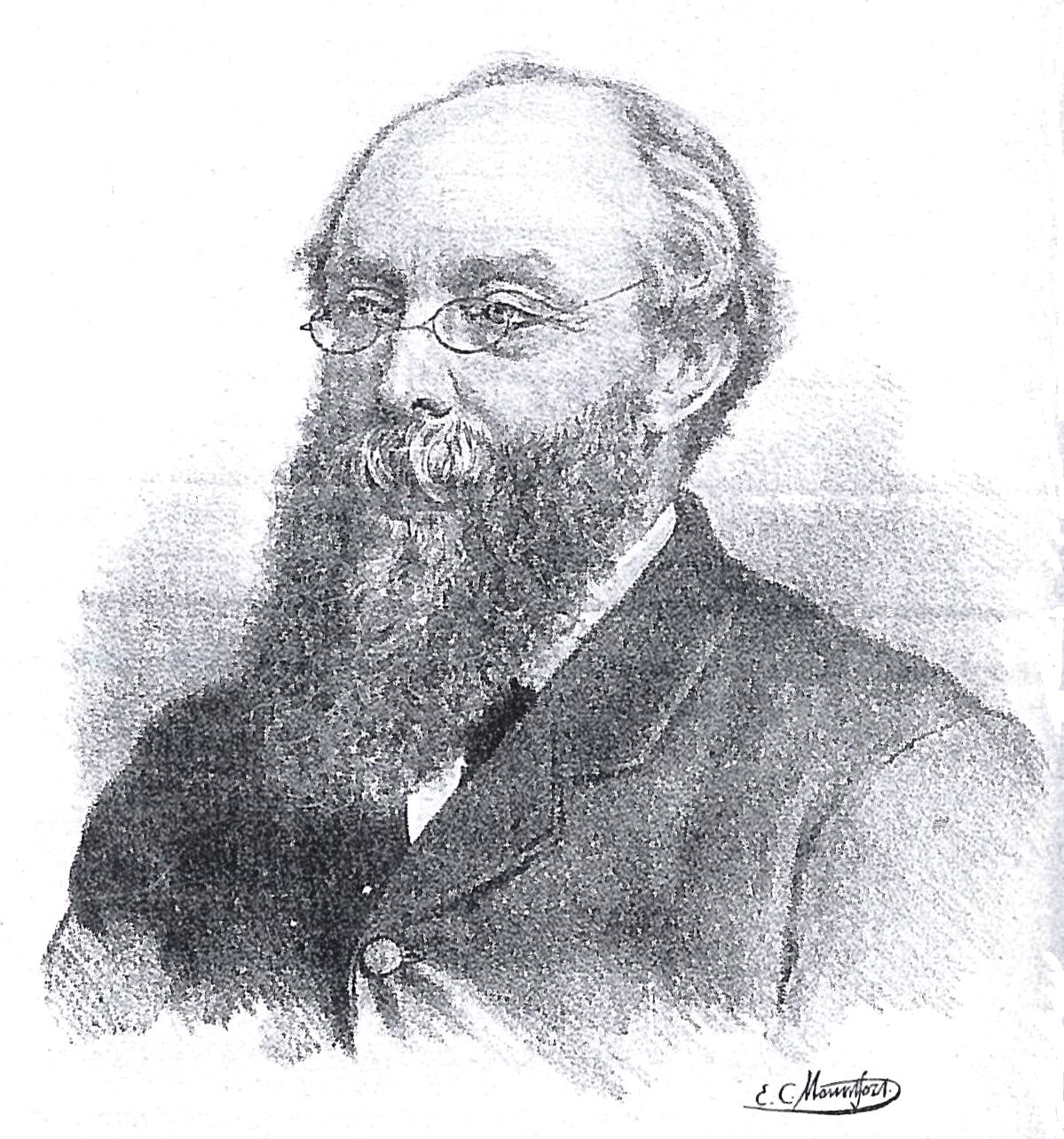
- Born: 1826; Cheadle, Staffordshire
- Died: 25 March 1911 (aged 84); Edgbaston, Birmingham
- Education: Rose Hill School, Handsworth
- Occupation: Architect
- Known for: Liberal politics

Signature
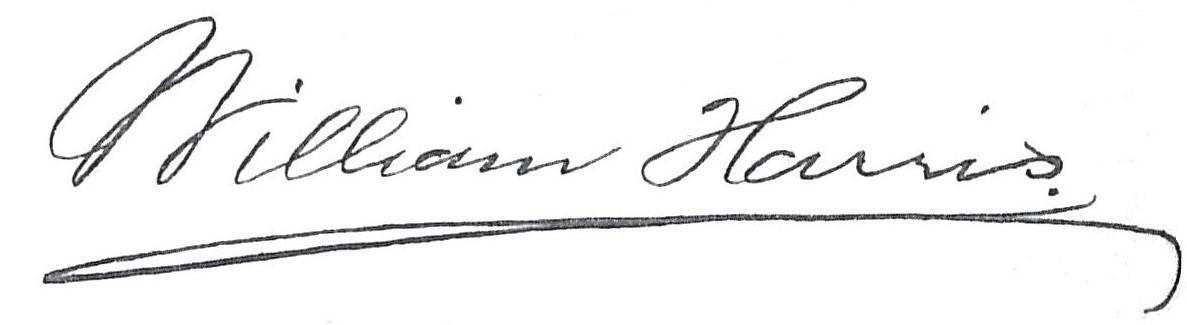

William Harris (1826 – 25 March 1911) was a Liberal politician and strategist in Birmingham, England, in an era of dramatic municipal reform. On his death, he was described by one obituary-writer as "one of the founders of modern Birmingham". J. L. Garvin called him "the Abbé Sieyès of Birmingham" (in allusion to one of the chief political theorists of the French Revolutionary era); and Asa Briggs "a most active and intelligent wire-puller behind the scenes". He was dubbed the "father of the Caucus", the highly organised and controversial Liberal party machine that had its origins in Birmingham, but was afterwards introduced at national level to the National Liberal Federation. He served as the first Chairman of the National Liberal Federation from 1877 to 1882. By profession he was an architect and surveyor; and he was also a prolific journalist and author.

== Early life ==
William Harris was born in 1826 in Cheadle, Staffordshire, the son of Joseph Harris and his wife Elizabeth, née Swindell. His parents' liaison had met with the disapproval of their families, and they had eloped together in 1822, to be married at Gretna Green. William moved to Birmingham when young, and was educated at Rose Hill School, Handsworth.

== Architectural career ==
Harris was articled to a Birmingham architect, Isaac Newey, at the age of 15. On completion of his articles in 1847, he established his own architectural practice. He was the first architect in Birmingham to practise as a quantity surveyor, and came to specialise in this branch of the profession.

In the late 1850s, he entered into a professional partnership with John Henry Chamberlain: it was short-lived, but the two remained friends, and in later life Harris would marry (as his second wife) Chamberlain's widow.

In 1876 he began a partnership with Henry Martin, and in 1879 these two were joined by Harris's son, Arnold Elsmere Harris (1854–1929), the firm subsequently practising as Harris, Martin and Harris. Notable commissions included: in 1878–79, 24 Priory Road, Edgbaston, a house for J. T. Bunce; in 1888, the Rolfe Street public baths, Smethwick, now re-erected at the Black Country Living Museum; in 1881–84, an extension to the headquarters building of the Birmingham Banking Company in Bennetts Hill, Birmingham; and, for the same company in 1883, the "Old Bank" (now a branch of HSBC) in Stratford-upon-Avon, which was decorated with 15 terracotta panels of Shakespearean scenes by Samuel Barfield (1830–1887) of Leicester. The Old Bank is described by Chris Pickford for the Pevsner Architectural Guides as "Stratford's best Victorian building". Martin left the partnership in 1889, and William Harris retired in 1895.

Combining his professional expertise with his enthusiasm for municipal reform, Harris served from 1877 to 1908 as clerk to the Birmingham, Tame and Rea District Drainage Board, at a time of major investment and improvement in the infrastructure of drainage and sewage disposal in Birmingham.

He was a founder-member of the Birmingham Architectural Society in 1850, and was afterwards active in its affairs.

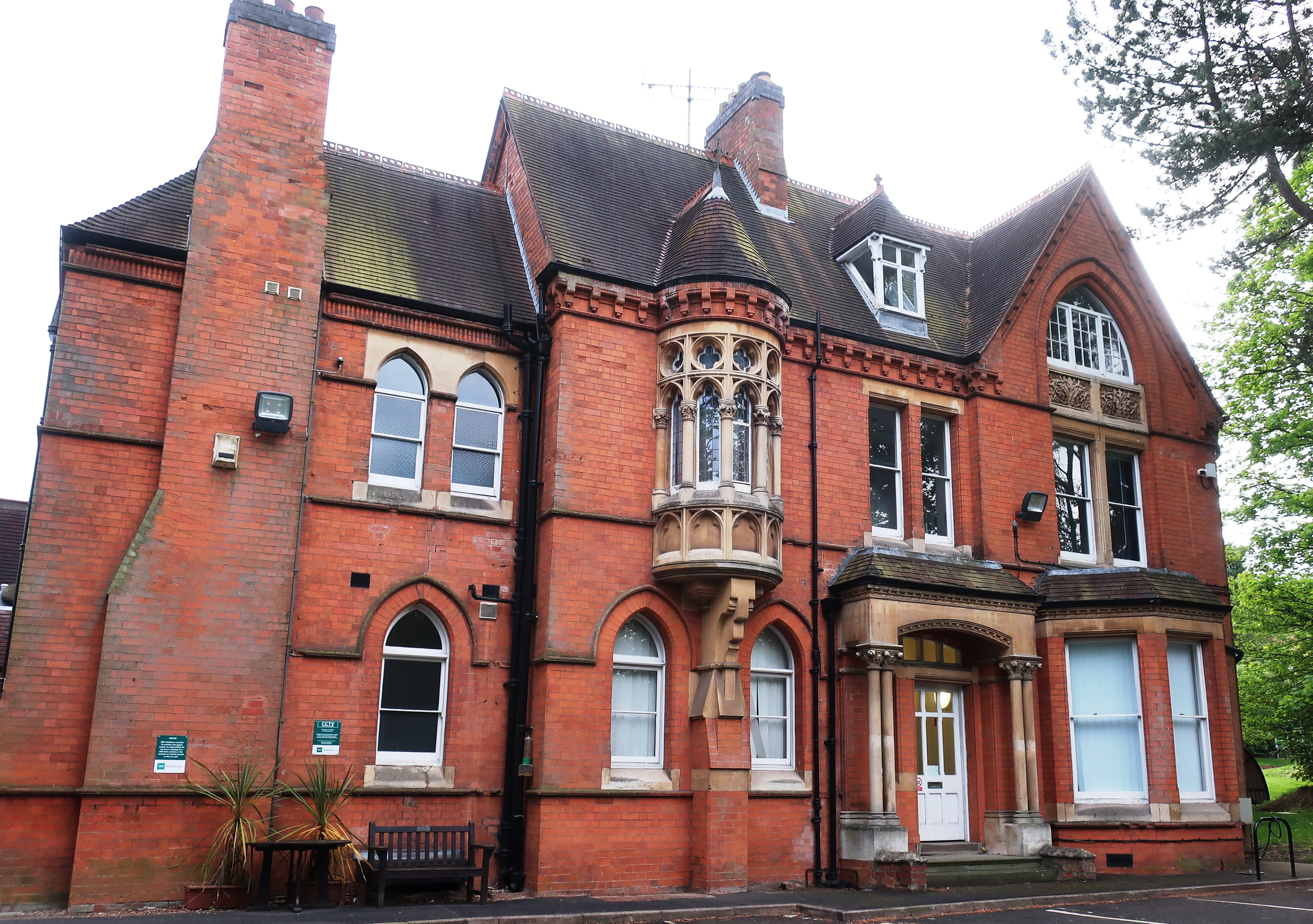
24 Priory Road, Edgbaston, built 1878–79

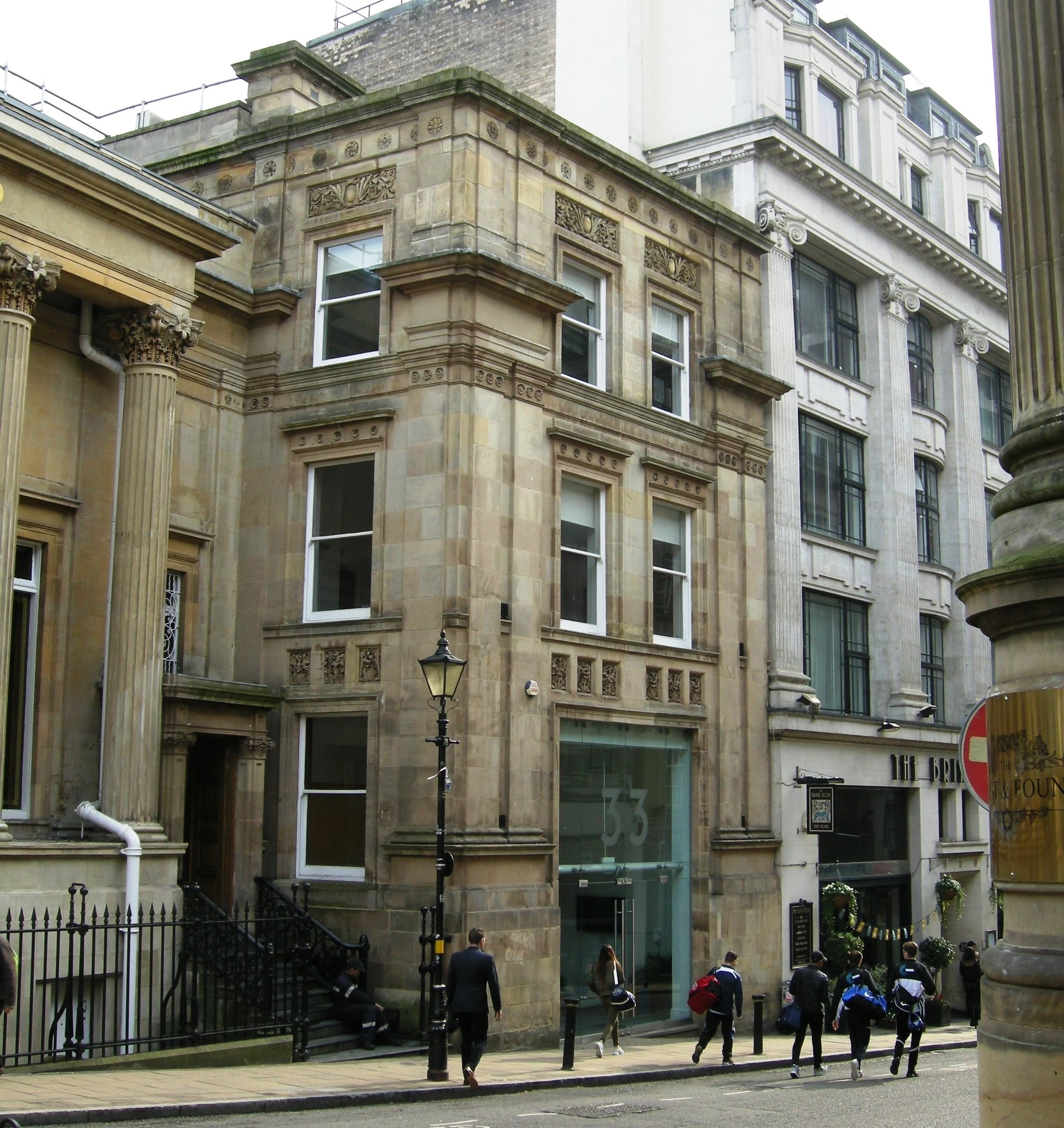
Extension to the Birmingham Banking Company building, Bennetts Hill, Birmingham, built 1881–84

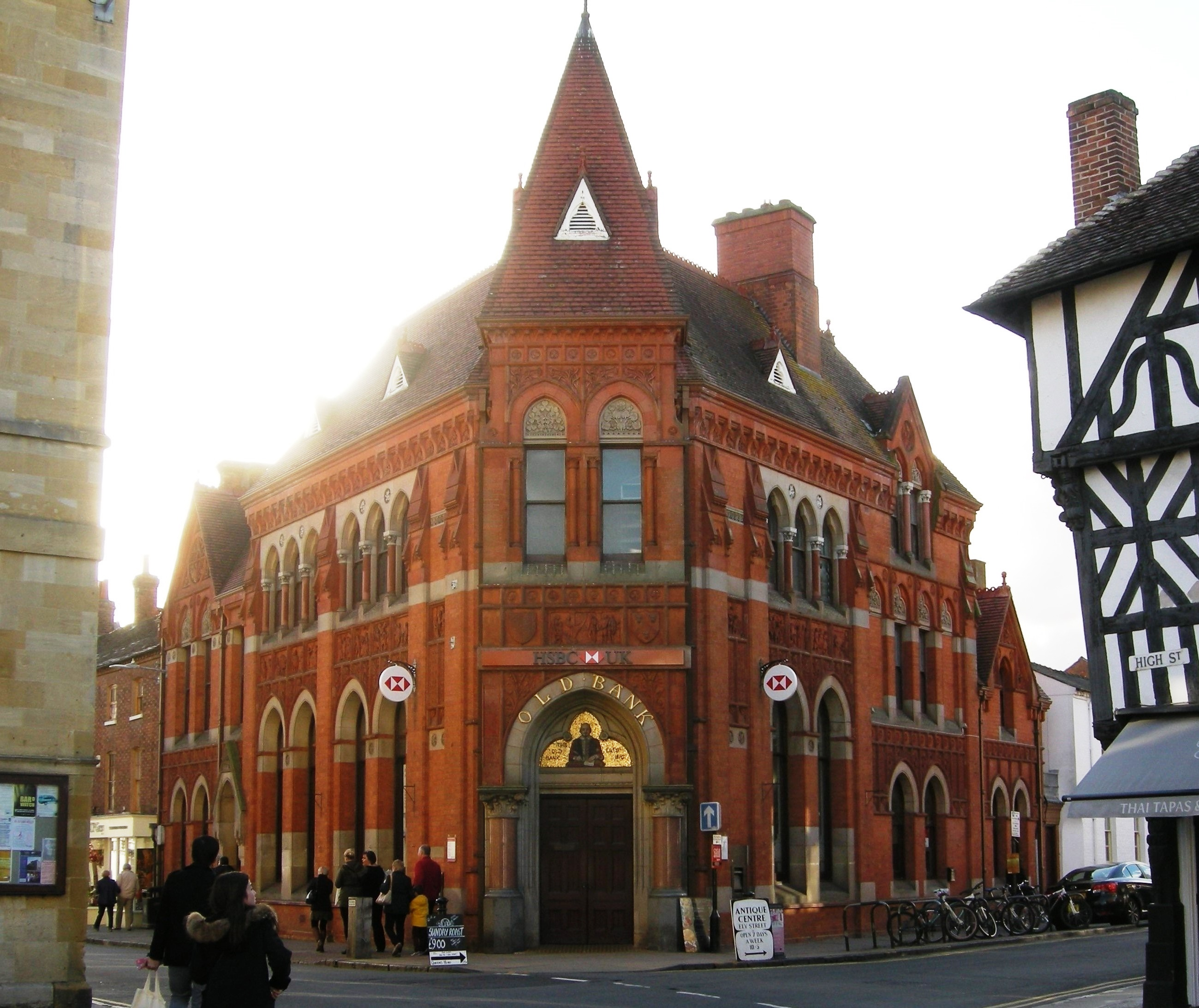
The "Old Bank", Stratford-upon-Avon, built 1883

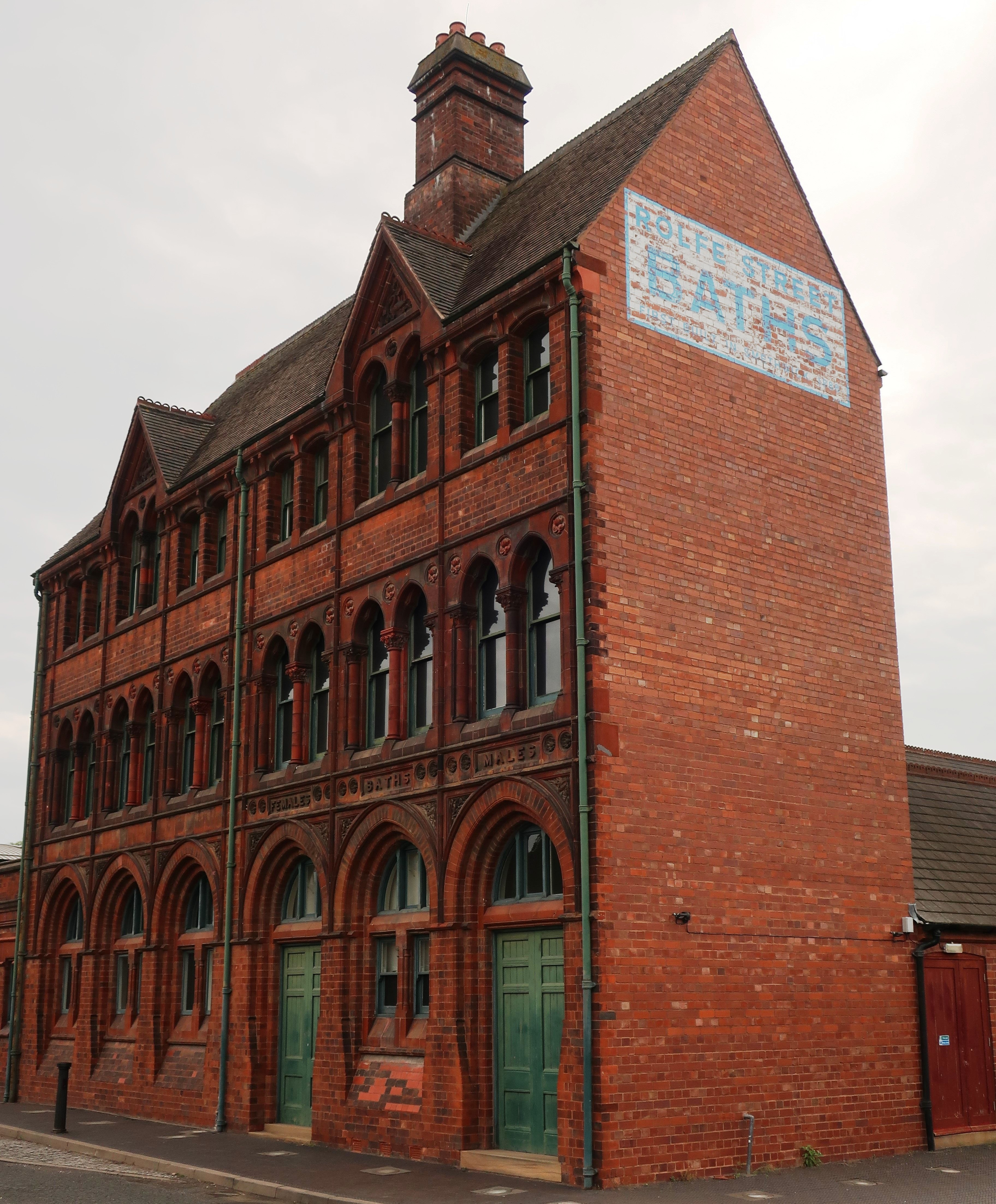
Rolfe Street public baths, Smethwick, built 1888: now re-erected at the Black Country Living Museum

== Politics ==
As a young man, Harris was greatly impressed by the charismatic nonconformist minister, George Dawson, who preached the doctrine of social improvement and enlightened municipal reform subsequently known as the "Civic Gospel". He became a founder-member of Dawson's non-denominational chapel, the Church of the Saviour, in 1847, where fellow-members included George Dixon, J. T. Bunce, J. A. Langford, Robert Martineau, Samuel Timmins, A. Follett Osler, and Joseph Chamberlain. With many of these same individuals, he honed his political and reformist ideas at meetings of the Birmingham and Edgbaston Debating Society, of which he served as President in 1864–5. He spoke publicly in support of Lajos Kossuth and the nationalist cause in Hungary, Garibaldi's republican struggle in Italy, and the liberation movement in Poland; and in criticism of the British government's conduct of the Crimean War.

In 1865 he became a founder-member of the Birmingham Liberal Association. After George Dixon, the first secretary, was elected to parliament in a by-election in 1867, Harris succeeded him as secretary in 1868, and oversaw the Association's reorganisation in preparation for the general election of that year. He remained secretary until 1873, when he was succeeded in turn by Francis Schnadhorst. He subsequently held office as the Association's Vice-President and President, finally retiring from the latter position, for reasons of ill-health, in 1882.

Also in 1865, he was himself elected to Birmingham Town Council, representing the united wards of Deritend and Bordesley. In the autumn of 1869 he headed the deputation that persuaded Joseph Chamberlain to stand for the Council, so launching the latter on a stellar political career. However, in 1871, when addressing a Council meeting, Harris suffered a minor paralytic stroke. Although he made a full recovery, he was sufficiently concerned about his health to stand down as a councillor, and his own political career thereafter tended to be more that of a backstage manager and strategist. The Yorkshire Post described him in 1884 as "of so modest and retiring a temperament that he is never seen or heard, and uninitiated people 'do not believe that there is any such person as Mr Harris', although he is the chief wire-puller".

He was an ardent campaigner – again, alongside Dawson, Chamberlain, Dixon and others – for a system of free, compulsory, and non-sectarian elementary education. He was joint honorary secretary of the Birmingham branch of the National Public School Association, established in 1850 but short-lived; sat on the committee of the Birmingham Education Society established in 1867; and, when this evolved in 1869 into the National Education League, continued to be a committee-member and a significant participant until 1877, when the League was wound up and absorbed unto the National Liberal Federation. He tried to adapt his "Vote as you're told" scheme (see The Caucus below) to elections to school boards in 1870; but here the complexity of the voting system defeated him, and his strategies met with only limited success.

He was a member of the Arts Club, which existed from 1873 to 1880 for the purpose "of facilitating the daily social intercourse of gentlemen professing Liberal opinions, who are engaged or interested in the public life of Birmingham".

== The Caucus ==
Harris is particularly remembered as the architect of the "Liberal Caucus". Under the 1867 Reform Act, Birmingham had been allocated three seats in the House of Commons, while each elector had two votes to cast. From a party perspective, there was a danger of votes being "wasted" by being cast in unnecessarily large numbers for a single popular candidate (specifically, at this time, John Bright), and of less popular candidates losing out. For the 1868 general election, Harris therefore introduced a new four-tier organisational structure – of ward committees, General Committee, Executive Committee, and Management Committee – by means of which Liberal supporters in different wards could be marshalled to vote for candidates in different combinations, so ensuring an even spread. The plan – derided by its opponents as "Vote as you're told" – was wholly successful, and all three Liberal candidates were returned to Parliament with little significant difference in their polling figures. The strategy's mathematical basis was analysed in 1884–5 by Charles Dodgson ("Lewis Carroll") in a booklet, The Principles of Parliamentary Representation. Harris himself justified his reforms on democratic grounds, arguing that the party structure "should not only be a reflex of popular opinion, but should be so manifestly a reflex of that opinion that none could doubt it". In recognition of his contribution to the Liberal cause, a subscription list was prepared, and a gift of £240 presented to him in May 1869.

In 1877, this local model of organisational control was transferred, in a form modified by Harris, to the newly established National Liberal Federation. Joseph Chamberlain acknowledged that "The whole credit of having initiated and carried out this new machinery belongs to my friend, Mr Harris." At the meeting in Birmingham on 31 May 1877 at which the Federation was launched, Harris delivered a "fiery harangue", again extolling the democratic foundations of the new structure, and arguing that it would henceforth be impossible for the government to ignore the popular will on such topical issues as the "Eastern Question". He was elected the Federation's first Chairman (with Chamberlain as President, and Schnadhorst as Secretary), and held office until 1882, when he stood down for health reasons. It was this rigorously disciplined party machine, further consolidated and emulated elsewhere, that became known to both detractors and supporters as the "Caucus"; and Harris was named the "father of the Caucus".

== Liberal Party split ==
In 1886, Joseph Chamberlain resigned from the Liberal government over William Gladstone's proposals for Irish Home Rule. The Birmingham Liberal Association, with the notable exception of Schnadhorst, stood behind Chamberlain. Harris was also among Chamberlain's supporters, but attempted to broker a compromise: he put a resolution to the National Liberal Federation which accepted the principle of a legislative assembly for Ireland, while at the same time asking Gladstone to maintain Irish representation at Westminster. This was defeated, and, with other Birmingham Liberals, Harris resigned from the General Committee of the Federation. However, early in 1888 he transferred his allegiance to the Gladstone camp, and was reinstated. He eventually retired from the committee in 1895.

== Writing and cultural activities ==
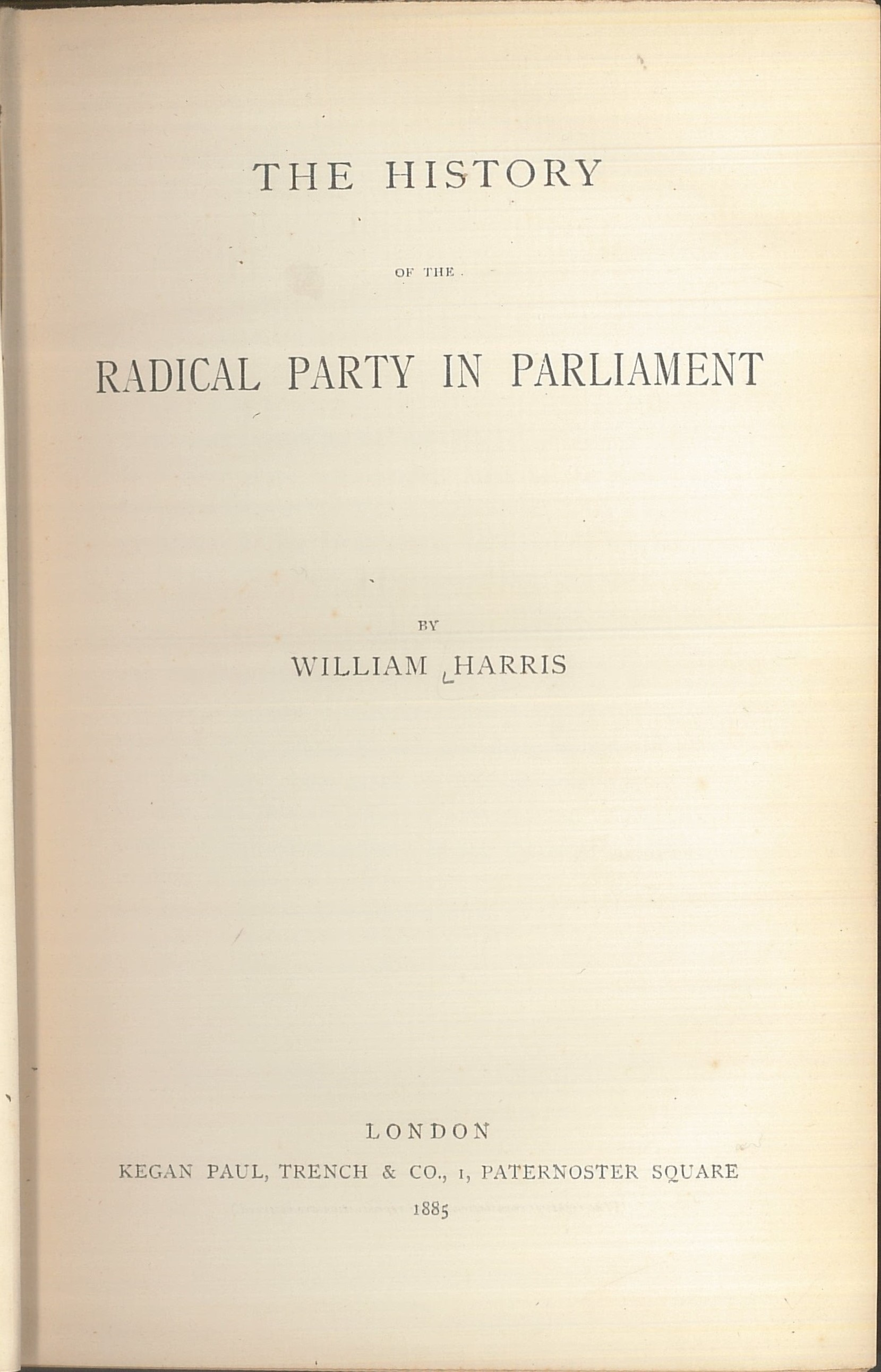
Title page of Harris's History of the Radical Party in Parliament (1885)

Harris was a prolific writer in the radical cause. In 1855, with George Dawson, James Freeman, and others, he helped launch, and then became editor of, a local radical daily newspaper, the Birmingham Daily Press. This was well received, but a commercial failure: it merged with the Birmingham Mercury in 1857, and ceased publication entirely in November 1858. In 1861, again with other members of the Dawson circle, he became one of the founders of, and an anonymous contributor to, a more successful satirical paper, The Town Crier. This sought, through humour, to compare "municipal government as it was – in incompetent hands – with municipal government as it might be", and "in those days wielded considerable influence in the town". At the monthly Town Crier dinners Harris is described as being "amusingly epigrammatic". He afterwards became an active (but still anonymous) leader-writer for the Birmingham Daily Post under the editorship of his friend, J. T. Bunce. In this capacity, he is described by H. R. G. Whates as an "old Radical warhorse". Even after the 1886–8 split in the Liberal Party had distanced him from many of his former associates, he continued to contribute articles to the Post on foreign affairs and other topics.

In 1848, he became one of a group of friends who met regularly at one another’s houses to discuss philosophical, political and social matters. They called themselves the "Inner Circle", and it became their custom to prepare some written presentation in advance. In 1850, three of the members, Harris, J. A. Langford and Henry Latham, published a volume of poems that had emerged from these sessions, entitled Thoughts from the Inner Circle.

In 1885, Harris published a substantial History of the Radical Party in Parliament. Robert Spence Watson wrote in 1907 that this work "ought to be known to every Liberal"; and H. R. G. Whates considered it "still not wholly superseded" in 1957.

Harris was prominent on the committee that – following a failed attempt in 1852 – persuaded Birmingham Town Council in 1859 to adopt the Public Libraries Act, paving the way for the opening of the city’s Central Lending and Reference Libraries in 1865–6, and other branch libraries. He subsequently served from 1868 to 1871 as chairman of the Birmingham Free Libraries Committee. In about 1858, he, Dawson, Samuel Timmins, Bunce, J. H. Chamberlain, and others in their circle, began to meet irregularly for literary and cultural discussions: by 1860, these meetings had been regularised into a more formal club, which in 1862 was named "Our Shakespeare Club". Whates calls Our Shakespeare Club "the intellectual centre of the community, [and] the nineteenth century equivalent of the famous Lunar Society". It was largely responsible for the establishment of the Shakespeare Memorial Library within the Central Library building in 1864 (the tercentenary year of Shakespeare's birth). Harris published an official History of the club in 1903.

In 1870, along with J. T. Bunce, he was appointed by the Council to oversee the purchase of pictures and objects for the proposed Birmingham Art Gallery. He served on the council of the Birmingham and Midland Institute during the secretaryship of J. H. Chamberlain; and was also a member of the Birmingham Philosophical Society.

== Later years and death ==
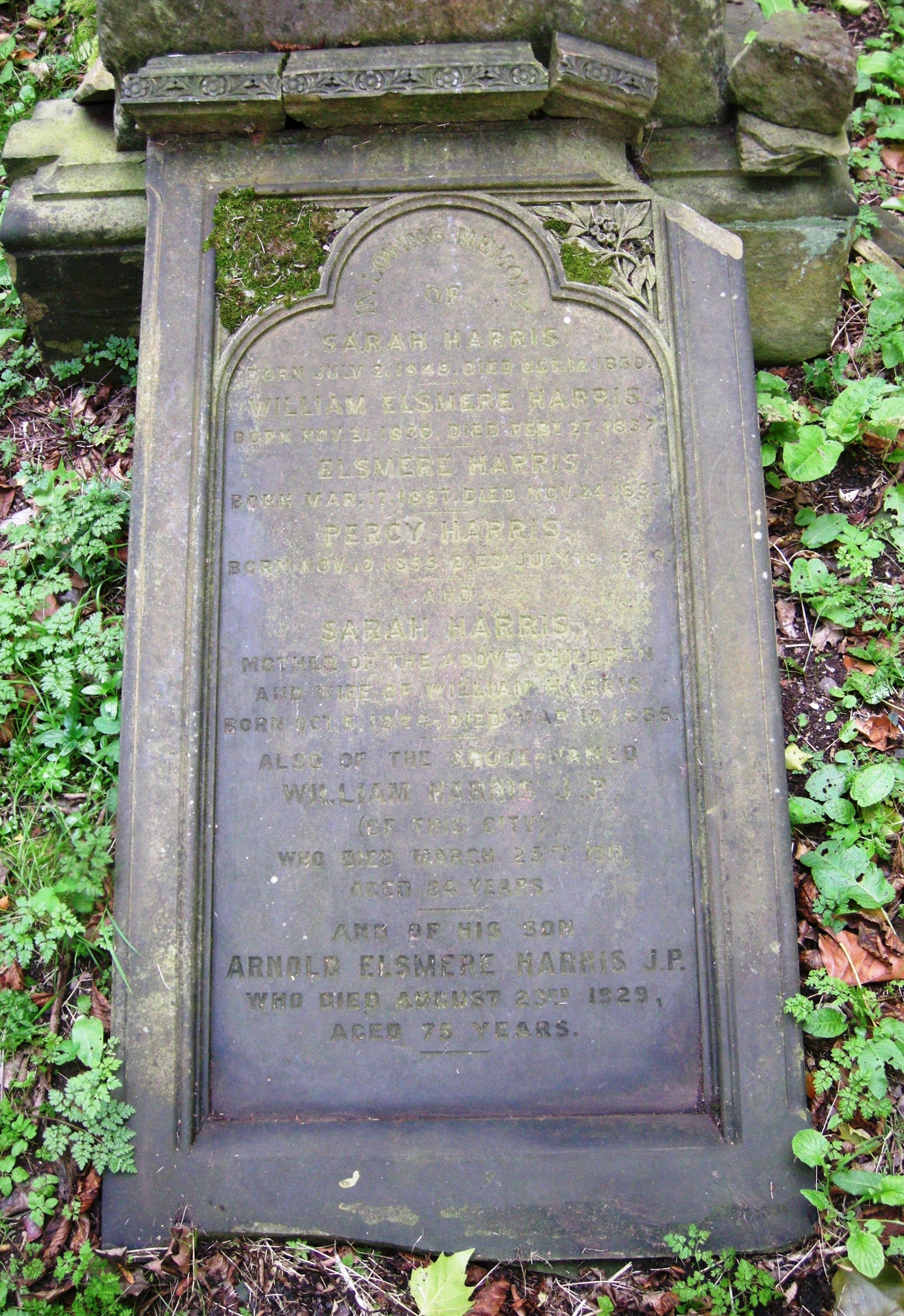
Headstone (now fallen) of William Harris, his first wife Sarah, and five of their six children, in Key Hill Cemetery, Hockley

The split within the Liberal Party in 1886–8 over Irish Home Rule marked the disintegration of what had been a close-knit circle of like-minded reformers. In 1892, the radical preacher Dr Robert Dale, looking back to the 1870s, mused:

Birmingham is still a remarkable place, … but it seems to me that the interesting people are gone. ... There was Dawson ... [Charles] Vince, John Henry Chamberlain and Harris, and Joseph Chamberlain in his fresh and brilliant promise. Dawson, Vince, and John Henry Chamberlain are dead; Harris remains, and is as kindly and epigrammatic as ever; but in the break-up of the Liberal Party he remained with Gladstone and I seldom see him. ... The split of the Liberal Party has made an immense difference to my private life.

Harris sat as a Justice of the Peace in Birmingham from 1880 until 1904, when increasing deafness forced his retirement.

He died on 25 March 1911, of heart failure following an attack of bronchitis, and was buried, alongside his first wife, in Key Hill Cemetery, Hockley.

== Personal life ==
In 1848, Harris married Sarah Elsmere (1824–1885), daughter of Richard Elsmere of High Ercall, Shropshire. The couple had six children, of whom a girl and three boys died in infancy, leaving two sons to survive to adulthood: Sydney (1852–1903), and Arnold (1854–1929), who joined his father in his architectural practice. In 1888, Harris married as his second wife Anna Mary Chamberlain (née Abrahams), the widow of his friend and former professional partner, J. H. Chamberlain. She survived him.

== Publications ==
- Langford, J. A.; Harris, William; Latham, H. (1850). Thoughts from the Inner Circle. London: Simpkin, Marshall. (poetry)
- Harris, William (1885). The History of the Radical Party in Parliament. London: Kegan Paul, Trench & Co.
- Harris, William (1903). The History of Our Shakespeare Club. Birmingham: Birmingham Journal.

== Bibliography ==
- Anon. (June 1889). "Mr William Harris, J.P.". Edgbastonia. 9 (98): 81–85.
- Anon. (April 1911). "The late Mr William Harris, J.P.". Edgbastonia. 31 (359): 61–70.
- Briggs, Asa (1952). History of Birmingham: Borough and City 1865–1938. Vol. 2. London: Oxford University Press.
- Briggs, Asa (1993). "Birmingham: the making of a Civic Gospel". Victorian Cities (3rd ed.). Berkeley: University of California Press. pp. 184–240.
- Cawood, Ian (2019–20). "Birmingham, the 'Caucus' and the 1868 general election". Journal of Liberal History. 105: 30–36.
- Garvin, J. L.; Amery, Julian (1932–69). The Life of Joseph Chamberlain. London: Macmillan. (6 vols)
- Hennock, E. P. (1973). Fit and Proper Persons: ideal and reality in nineteenth-century urban government. London: Edward Arnold. ISBN 0-7131-5665-1.
- Herrick, Francis H. (1945). "The Origins of the National Liberal Federation". Journal of Modern History. 17 (2): 116–29. doi:10.1086/236914. JSTOR 1871956. S2CID 153365948.
- Langford, John Alfred (1877). Modern Birmingham and its Institutions: a chronicle of local events, from 1841 to 1871. Vol. 2. Birmingham: William Downing.
- McGill, Barry (1962). "Francis Schnadhorst and Liberal Party organization". Journal of Modern History. 34 (1): 19–39. doi:10.1086/238994. JSTOR 1874816. S2CID 143926079.
- Marris, N. Murrell (1900). The Right Honourable Joseph Chamberlain: the man and the statesman. London: Hutchinson.
- Reekes, Andrew (2018). The Birmingham Political Machine: winning elections for Joseph Chamberlain. Alcester: West Midlands History. ISBN 978-1-905036-42-4.
- Rosenthal, Leslie (2016). "Joseph Chamberlain and the Birmingham Town Council, 1865–1880". Midland History. 41 (1): 71–95. doi:10.1080/0047729x.2016.1159852. S2CID 148117850.
- Skipp, Victor (1983). The Making of Victorian Birmingham. Yardley. ISBN 0-9506998-3-7.
- Watson, Robert Spence (1907). The National Liberal Federation: from its commencement to the General Election of 1906. London: T. Fisher Unwin.
- Whates, H. R. G. (1957). The Birmingham Post 1857–1957: a centenary retrospect. Birmingham: Birmingham Post & Mail Limited.
- Wilson, Wright (1905). The Life of George Dawson, M.A. Glasgow (2nd ed.). Birmingham: Percival Jones.

Party political offices
Preceded by New position	Chairman of the National Liberal Federation; 1877–1882	Succeeded by William Kenrick
