= John Langford =

John Langford may refer to:

- John Langford (engineer), president of Aurora Flight Sciences
- John Langford (computer scientist), at Microsoft Research
- John Langford (rugby union) (born 1968), Australian rugby union player
- John Alfred Langford (1823–1903), English journalist, poet and antiquary

== See also ==
- Jon Langford (born 1957), musician and artist
- John Langford-Holt (1916–1993), British politician
