= Robert William Dale =

English Congregational church leader

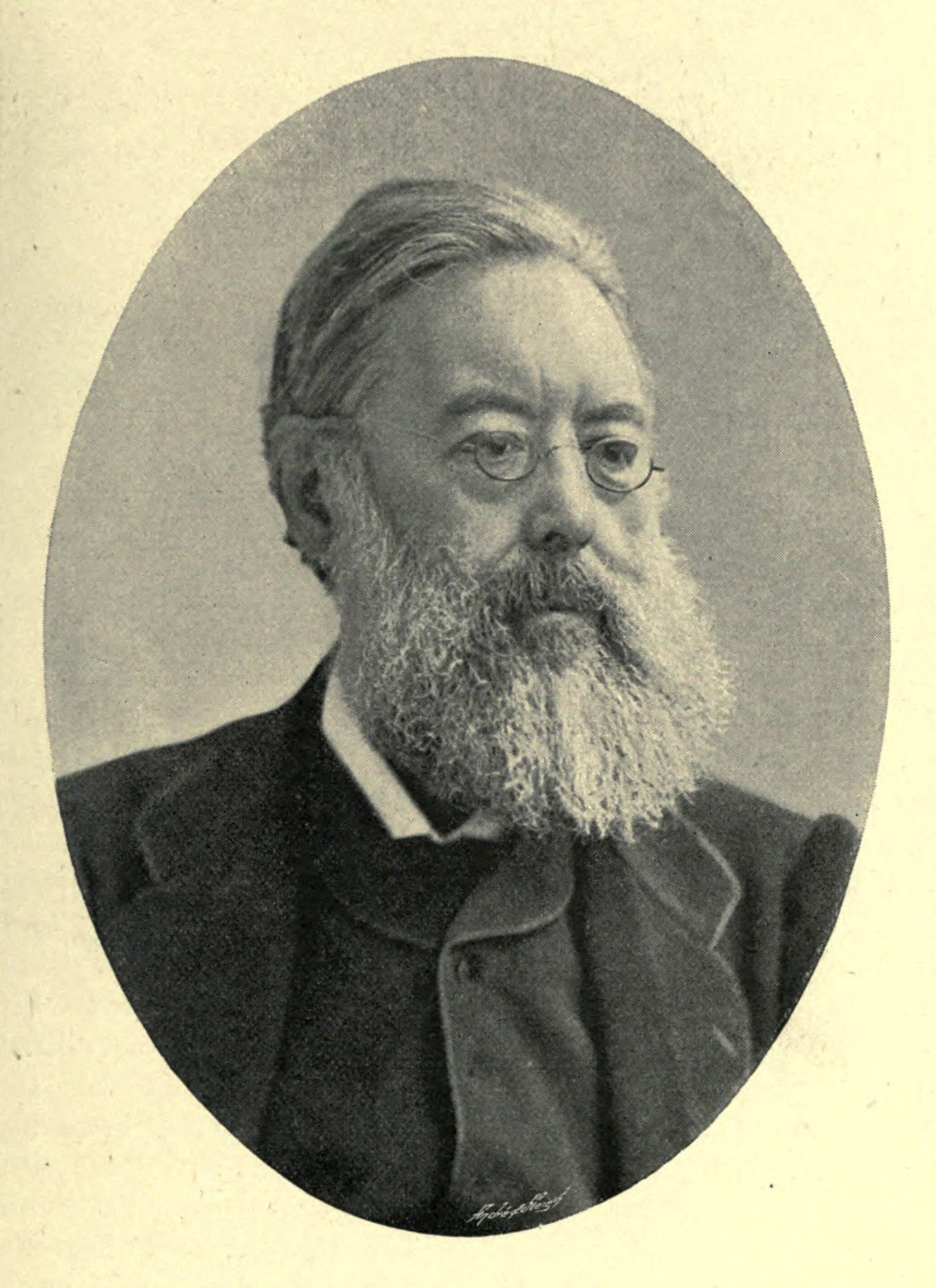
- Born: 1 December 1829; London
- Died: 13 March 1895 (aged 65)
- Education: Spring Hill College
- Occupation: Congregational minister

Signature
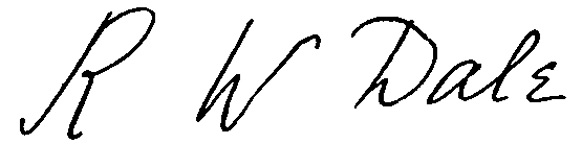

Robert William Dale (1 December 1829 – 13 March 1895) was an English Congregational church leader based in Birmingham.

== Life ==
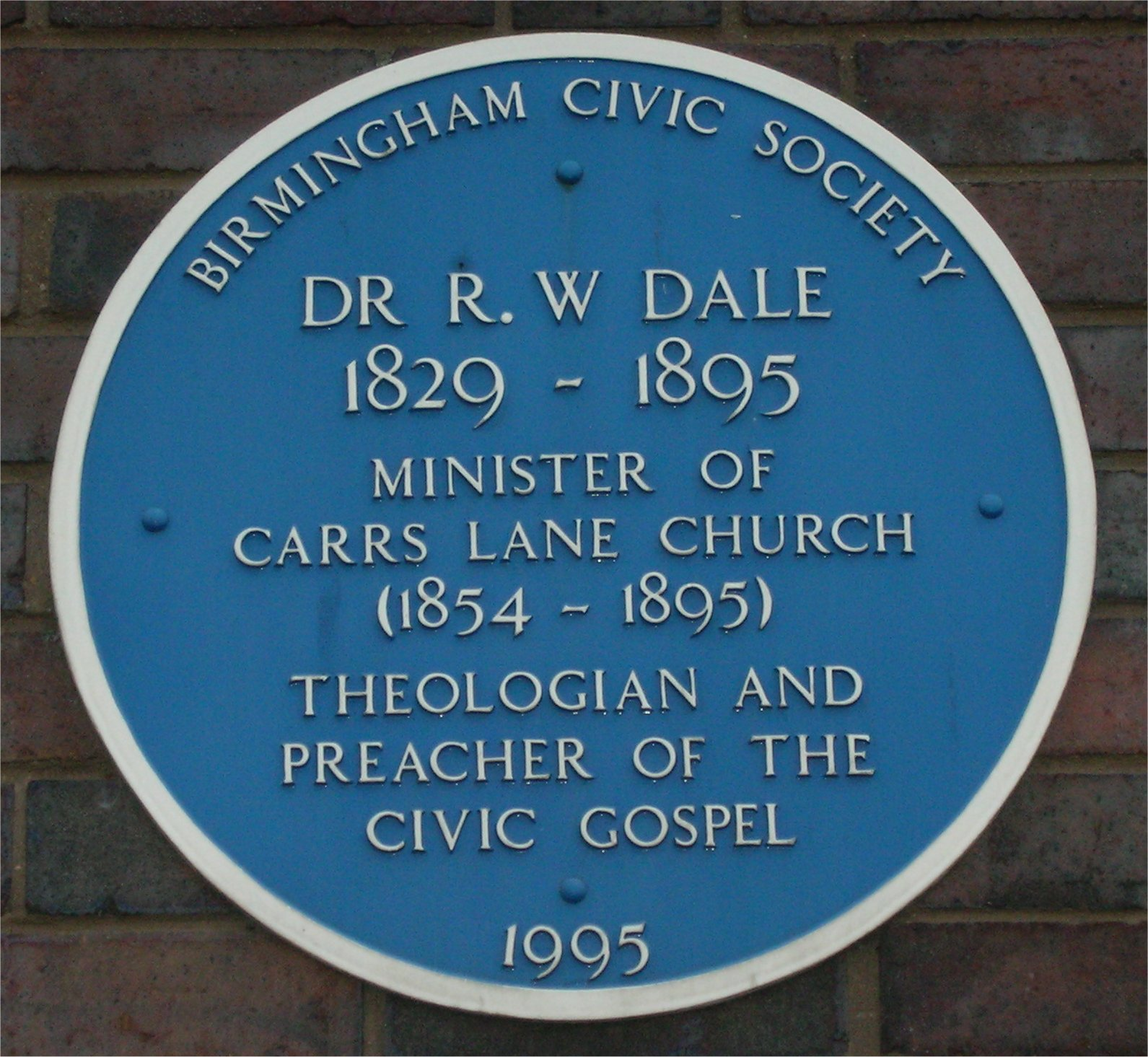
Blue plaque on the modern Carrs Lane Church, Birmingham

Dale was born in London and educated at Spring Hill College, Birmingham, for the Congregational ministry. In 1853 he was invited to Carr's Lane Chapel, Birmingham, as co-pastor with John Angell James, on whose death in 1859 he became sole pastor for the rest of his life. In the University of London M.A. examination (1853), he came first in philosophy and won the gold medal. The degree of LL.D. was conferred upon him in 1883 by the University of Glasgow during the lord rectorship of John Bright. Yale University gave him its D.D. degree, although he never used it. He served as Chairman of the Congregational Union of England and Wales in 1868 and President of the International Congregational Council in 1891.

== Views and publications ==
Dale normally read his sermons, because "if I spoke extemporaneously I should never sit down again". He did not use the title "Reverend". He was a strong advocate of the disestablishment of the Church of England, holding that the Christian church was essentially a spiritual brotherhood, and that any vestige of political authority impaired its spiritual work. In church government he believed strongly that congregationalism was the most fitting environment for Christianity. He published lectures on such topics as The Atonement (1875, and frequently reprinted), sermons, and the Manual of Congregational Principles (1884); and, at his death, he left an unfinished history of Congregationalism, revised by his son, A. W. W. Dale.

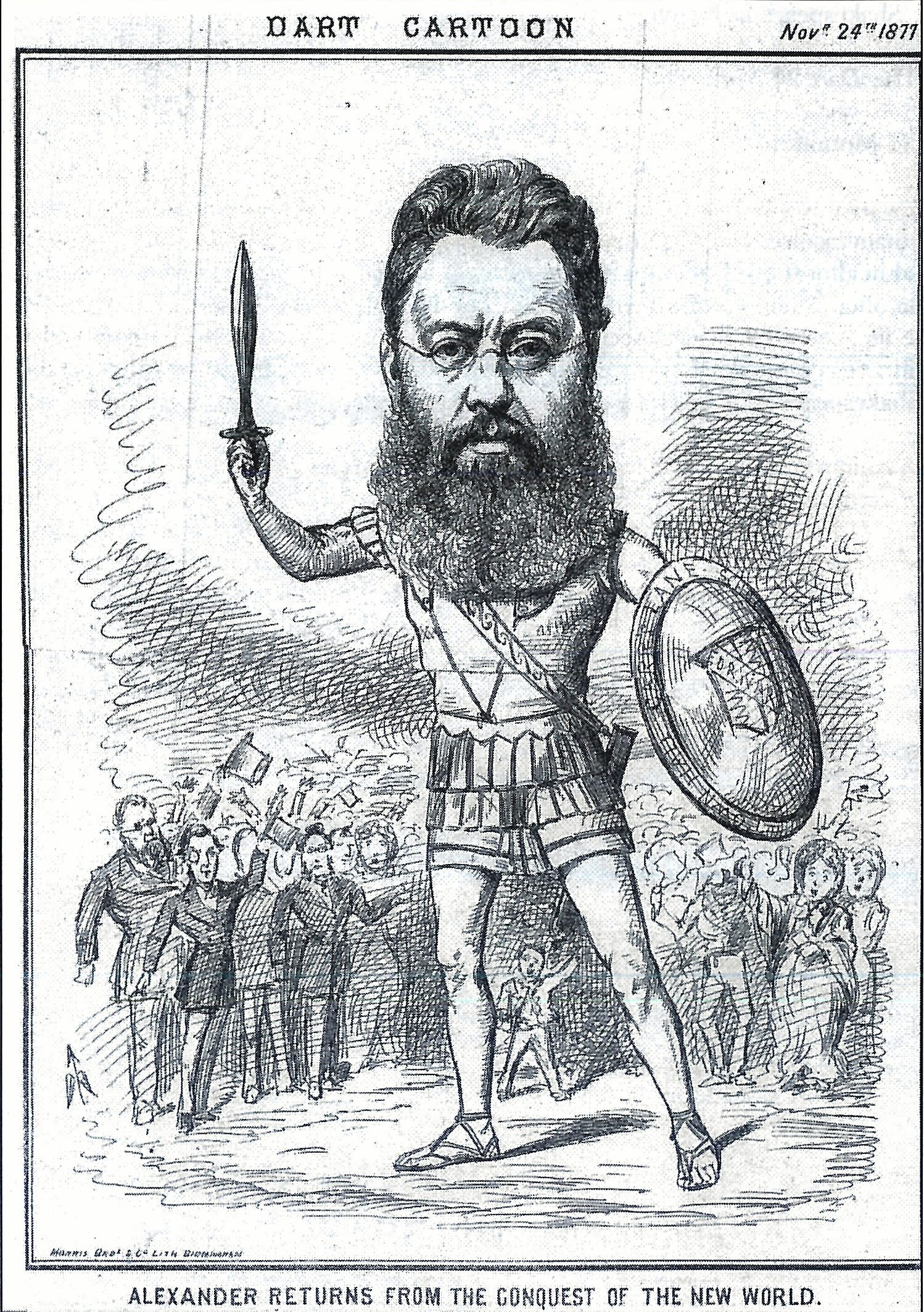
Dale depicted as Alexander the Great, on his return to Birmingham from a successful lecture tour of the United States in 1877

== The "Civic Gospel" and politics ==
Dale's integrity, intelligence, moral passion and oratory soon made him a national figure in an age when the strength of non-conformity was at its highest. He welcomed social improvement and was an advocate, with George Dawson, of what became known in Birmingham as the Civic Gospel. The health, housing, sanitation and living conditions in Birmingham had suffered from its rapid population expansion in the previous thirty years. Dale argued "the public duty of the state is the private duty of every citizen": service on the town council to improve the wellbeing of Birmingham was advocated by Dale as having moral and religious worth. He was an advocate of free public education, social improvement, the extension of the franchise, the recognition of trades unions, and understanding the links between poverty and crime.

Although Dale did not preach politics, he was a keen Liberal and worked with other Birmingham reformers and radicals including Joseph Chamberlain, William Kenrick, Jesse Collings, George Dixon, John Bright, John Henry Chamberlain, William Harris, and Samuel Timmins. He played a major part in opposing the religious elements of the Forster Education Act of 1870 (see below).

He was a member of the Arts Club, which existed from 1873 to 1880 for the purpose "of facilitating the daily social intercourse of gentlemen professing Liberal opinions, who are engaged or interested in the public life of Birmingham": it was described in a local newspaper as "the real seat of government, where all measures are framed for the ordering of our municipal, social, charitable, and political institutions".

When Joseph Chamberlain resigned from the Liberal government in 1886 over William Gladstone's proposals for Irish Home Rule, Dale supported him. This point marked a significant split in the Liberal party, but did not reduce Dale's influence.

== Work in education ==
When Forster's Elementary Education Bill appeared, Dale attacked it. He argued that the resulting schools would often be purely denominational institutions and the Bill's "conscience clause" gave inadequate protection to Nonconformists. Dale criticised the way school boards would be empowered to make grants out of the rates to maintain sectarian schools. He was himself in favour of secular education, claiming that it was the only logical solution and was consistent with Nonconformist principles. In Birmingham this controversy was ended in 1879 by a compromise.

His interest in educational affairs had led him to accept a seat on the Birmingham school board. He was appointed a governor of Foundation of the Schools of King Edward VI in Birmingham and served on the Royal Commission of Education. Dale took a great interest in Spring Hill Congregational College, Moseley (where he had previously studied). Largely due to his initiative, Spring Hill College, renamed Mansfield College after its founders, was moved to Oxford in 1886 and he became chairman of the council of what is now Mansfield College, Oxford.

== Later years ==
The 1886 split within the Liberal Party over Irish Home Rule marked the disintegration of what had been a close-knit circle of like-minded reformers. In 1892, looking back to the 1870s, Dale wrote:

Birmingham is still a remarkable place, … but it seems to me that the interesting people are gone. … There was Dawson, … [Charles] Vince, John Henry Chamberlain and Harris, and Joseph Chamberlain in his fresh and brilliant promise. Dawson, Vince, and John Henry Chamberlain are dead; Harris remains, and is as kindly and epigrammatic as ever; but in the break-up of the Liberal Party he remained with Gladstone and I seldom see him.
Joseph Chamberlain is, of course, still immensely interesting; but I am not sure that he is as interesting as he was twenty years ago, and he is necessarily much away from Birmingham. The time was when I used to have a smoke with him, and J. H. Chamberlain, and Timmins, and the rest, as often as two or three times a week. The split of the Liberal Party has made an immense difference to my private life. There are two clubs and I belong to neither; I have friends on both sides, but the discussions that we had at the old Arts Club before the quarrel I look back upon with lasting regret.

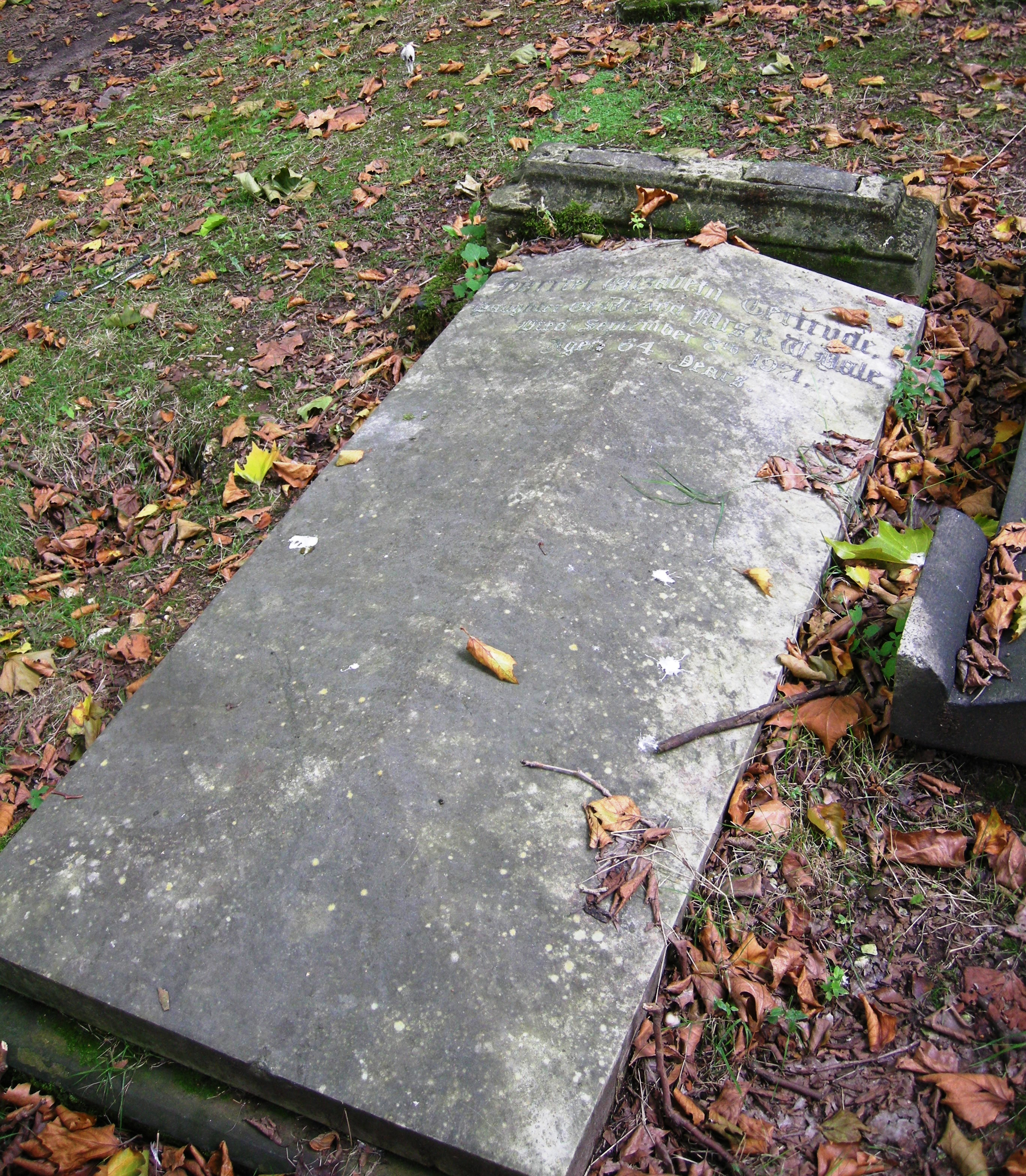
Dale's grave in Key Hill Cemetery, Hockley. The headstone commemorating Dale is lost: the surviving inscription commemorates his daughter, Harriet (d. 1921).

== Death and commemoration ==
Dale died on 13 March 1895 and was buried in Key Hill Cemetery, Hockley.

A statue of Dale sculpted by Edward Onslow Ford in 1898 was rediscovered in 1995, and is now on loan from Birmingham Museum & Art Gallery to Carr's Lane Church Centre (his old church). The National Portrait Gallery holds a carte de visite photograph and a wood engraving of him.

There is a Birmingham Civic Society blue plaque commemorating him on Carrs Lane Church, Carrs Lane, Central Birmingham.
