= Sarah Crompton =

English children's writer

Sarah Crompton (1802 – 13 May 1881) was an English children's writer. She was widely known for her promotion of education amongst the poor. She wrote a number of books written with "short words" which were used to teach children and illiterate adults, including The Life of Christopher Columbus, in short words, and The Life of Robinson Crusoe in short words.

== Biography ==
Sarah Crompton was born in Mount Street, Birmingham, 1802. She was the eldest daughter of J. W. Crompton, a merchant. She was a sister of the surgeon, D. W. Crompton, and of Mrs. George Dawson.

In the early days of George Dawson's ministry in Birmingham, Crompton joined his congregation, and for many years was well known in the Church of the Saviour, and much respected for her quiet and unobtrusive work in the Sunday and evening schools connected with it. But her great interest in the promotion of education among the poor caused her name to be widely known beyond Birmingham.

She was the author of several books which proved useful in the instruction of children and illiterate adults. Stories in Short Words, Suggestive Hints on the Study of the Gospel, as well as the lives of Martin Luther and Christopher Columbus, were among the best of her publications.

Though in later years, she led a life of comparative retirement, her genial manners and her interest in literature and in passing events attracted many visitors to her parlour. After a slow decline, she died at Hagley Terrace in Birmingham, on 13 May 1881. Her remains were interred in the family vault in the Old Meeting House graveyard, by the Rev. Charles Clarke; she was the last buried in that cemetery.

== Selected works ==
- Old and new stories in short words, 1853
- Life of Martin Luther, 1860
- Tales of life in earnes, 1862
- A tale of the crusades, 1872
- The Life of Christopher Columbus, in short words
- The Life of Robinson Crusoe in short words
