= John Wellington Starr =

American inventor

John Wellington Starr (1822? – November 21, 1846) was an American inventor and pioneer in development of the incandescent light bulb.

== Life ==
Starr was born in Cincinnati.

In 1844, in association with John Milton Sanders (1821?–1877?), he filed a U.S. patent caveat for an incandescent lamp and generator. He appears never to have demonstrated his electric lamp while in Cincinnati.

In February 1845 Starr and a business associate, Edward Augustin King (d.1863), set out for England to secure British and French patents for the invention. King described the construction and use of a lamp in September 1845, and British patent No. 10,919 was granted to him on November 4, 1845. The patent described two styles of lamp. In one, a platinum strip (or filament) was operated in a glass enclosure, but was not in a vacuum. In the second type, a carbon strip held between two clamps was enclosed in a vacuum in the space above a column of mercury, in an arrangement similar to a barometer. The mercury column was required because vacuum pumps of the time could not provide the high vacuum needed to operate a carbon emitter for a practical duration. The construction of Starr's carbon lamp allowed the strip to be replaced when it failed, making the lamp renewable.

Starr and his associates demonstrated the two types of lamp in England, including a multi-branched lamp with a bulb to represent each of the twenty-six states then part of the United States. However, Starr had contracted tuberculosis (then called pthisis pulmonalis), and died on November 21, 1846. He was buried in Key Hill Cemetery, Birmingham.

== Later developments ==
After Starr's death, King and Saunders returned to the United States. It appears neither King nor Saunders could continue developing the lamp without Starr's knowledge. King later was killed while serving in the American Civil War. Sanders travelled extensively but left for Santo Domingo in 1877. As a consequence, none of Starr's partners were available for testimony in the lawsuits surrounding Thomas Edison's lamp patents.
