= Victor Skipp =

English local historian and art collector

Victor Henry Thomas Skipp (1925 – 24 December 2010) was an English local historian, art collector and amateur philosopher, who left his estate to Kettle's Yard in Cambridge.

== Life ==
Brought up in an "austere Nonconformist family", Victor Skipp "was exposed to a very different life serving with the Marines during WW2, and different again with post-war Cambridge". He graduated from Cambridge University in 1950 before teaching in secondary schools. In the 1960s and 1970s Skipp lectured at Bordesley College of Education, as well as running extramural research in local history at the University of Birmingham.

== Collection ==
Skipp built a collection of Modernist art and literature which he and his wife Pat arranged around their home, an old farmhouse in Hopton, Suffolk. His art collection included work by Ivon Hitchens, Bob Law, Linda Karshan and Alison Turnbull. Skipp took enormous care to consider the possibilities created by arranging disparate works of art in relation to each other:

In the last resort, the 'right' relationships often appear to be a matter of precise positioning, and/or of slight (and generally accidental) visual echoes and correspondences.

Upon his death he left his estate to Kettle's Yard in Cambridge. An exhibition of objects from Skipp's collection showed at Kettle's Yard in 2013–14.

== Selected works ==
- Discovering Sheldon: a brief history of a Birmingham parish from Anglo-Saxon to modern times, Birmingham: University of Birmingham, 1960
- An Eighteenth Century Farm Labourer's Family, London: Oxford University Press, 1963
- Out of the Ancient World, Harmondsworth: Penguin Books, 1967
- "The place of team-work in local history" and "The use of local history in the schools", in Victor Skipp & H. P. R. Finberg, eds., Local History: objective and pursuit, Newton Abbot: David & Charles, 1967
- Honest to Man: a religious alternative to Christianity, Beaconsfield: Darwen Finlayson, 1967
- Medieval Yardley: the origin and growth of a West Midland community, Chichester: Phillimore, 1970
- Crisis and development: an ecological case study of the forest of Arden, 1570–1674, Cambridge: Cambridge University Press, 1978
- The Centre of England: Warwickshire, Worcestershire, Staffordshire, East Shropshire, North Gloucestershire, London: Eyre Methuen, 1979
- The Making of Victorian Birmingham, Birmingham, 1983
- A History of Greater Birmingham: down to 1830, Studley: Brewin, 1997
- Industrial Revolution 'Then' and 'Now', or, Understanding Globalization: (the Birmingham experience), Diss: Greyhound Books, 2002
