= John Alfred Langford =

English journalist and antiquary (1823–1903)

John Alfred Langford (12 September 1823 – 24 January 1903) was an English journalist, poet and antiquary in Birmingham.

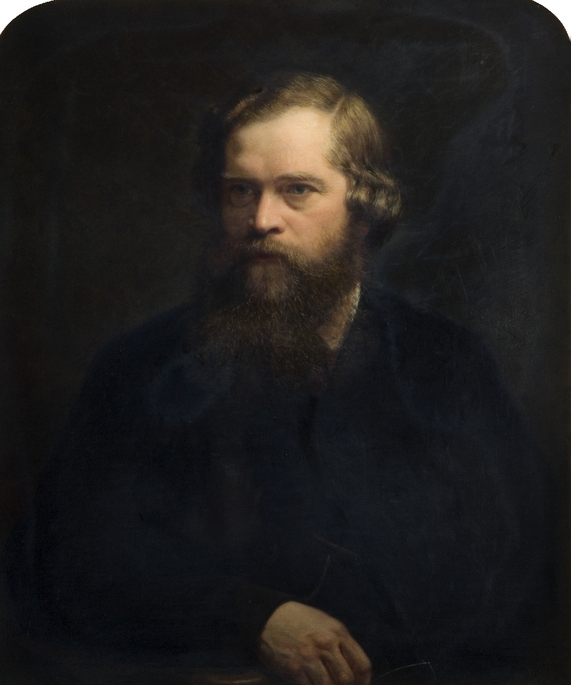
John Alfred Langford, 1863 portrait

== Early life ==
Born in Crawley's Court, Bradford Street, Birmingham, Warwickshire, Langford was the second surviving son of John Langford, who came to Birmingham from Wales in 1815, started business in 1828 as a chairmaker. He owed his early education to his mother, Harriet Eaton, a paralysed invalid.

After attending a private school in Brixhall Street, Deritend (1829–33), Langford entered his father's chair-making business at ten, and was apprenticed when thirteen in 1836. He read widely for himself. At 19, while still an apprentice, he married, and at 21 was a journeyman earning a guinea a week. While still young he studied at Birmingham's Mechanics' Institute. Later Langford drew on his early experiences as a pattern for self-help.

== Activism and journalism ==
In 1846 Langford became secretary of the newly established Birmingham Co-operative Society. In August 1847 he joined the new Unitarian Church of the Saviour, founded by George Dawson, originator of the doctrine of the "Civic Gospel". In the winter of 1850–1 he taught evening classes in the schools of Dawson's church, gave up chair-making, and opened a small news vendor's and bookseller's shop. From 1852 to 1855 he carried on a printing business (45 Ann Street).

In 1848, he became one of a group of friends who met regularly at one another's houses to discuss philosophical, political and social matters. They called themselves the "Inner Circle", and it became their custom to prepare some written presentation in advance. In 1850, three of the members, Langford, William Harris and Henry Latham, published a volume of poems that had emerged from these sessions, entitled Thoughts from the Inner Circle.

Langford became sub-editor of the newly founded radical Birmingham Daily Press (7 May 1855). This was well received, but a commercial failure: it merged with the Birmingham Mercury in 1857, and ceased publication entirely in November 1858. From 1862 to 1868 he was closely associated with the Birmingham Daily Gazette, a liberal-conservative daily paper, from which he withdrew on account of his radical views. He was honorary secretary of a Birmingham branch of the "Friends of Italy", formed in 1851, aided in the organisation of the Liberal Party when its headquarters were at Birmingham under the control of Francis Schnadhorst, and joined Dawson in running the Birmingham Morning News, an advanced liberal paper (2 January 1871 to 27 May 1876). After the split in the Liberal Party in 1886 he allied himself with the Gladstone Liberals, but then gradually dropped out of political work.

Langford helped in the acquisition for the public of Aston Hall and its park in 1858, and served as manager with a residence at the Hall until the purchase of the property by the corporation in 1864. He was teacher of English literature in the Birmingham and Midland Institute (1868–1874); and promoted the public libraries of the day, publishing an account of them and of the Birmingham Art Gallery in 1871.

== Last years ==
Langford was member of the Birmingham School Board (1874–85 and 1886–91). In 1875–6 he made a tour round the world with his friend Richard Tangye. He died on 24 January 1903 in his 80th year at 85 Fernley Road, Sparkhill, Birmingham. He was buried at Key Hill Cemetery, Hockley.

== Works ==
Langford's major publications were Century of Birmingham Life, 1741–1841 (2 vols. Birmingham, 1868), and Modern Birmingham and its Institutions (2 vols. 1873–7). Both works were largely compiled from the files of Aris's Birmingham Gazette and its successor, the Birmingham Daily Gazette. Other works were:

- Religious Scepticism and Infidelity; their History, Cause, Cure, and Mission, 1850.
- English Democracy; its History and Principles, 1853; 2nd edit. 1855.
- Staffordshire and Warwickshire Past and Present (with C. S. Mackintosh and J. C. Tildesley), 1884, 4 vols.

Langford contributed to periodicals, including Howitt's Journal. William Howitt wrote about a meeting with him in June 1847, under the title of A Visit to a Working-man (Howitt's Journal, ii. 242–4). In a pamphlet he defended George Dawson against an attack by George Gilfillan in Tait's Edinburgh Magazine (1848, pp. 279–285). As an "artisan poet", he was published during 1850 in Cooper's Journal, edited by Thomas Cooper. In verse were: commemorative poems on Shakespeare in 1859 and 1864; The Drama of a Life (in 5 scenes) and Aspiranda (1852); The King and the Commoner, a historical play (Birmingham, 1870); and A Life for Love, and other Poems (Birmingham, 1900).

== Family ==
By his first wife, Anne Swinton (d. 1847) who had worked for his father, Langford had four children, of whom only a daughter, wife of Dr George Craig, survived. By his second wife, Mary Anne, oldest daughter of F. Price, a printer, whom he married 7 April 1849, he had six children.
