= Linda Karshan =

American artist

- Born: 1947 (age 78–79)
- Known for: Performance-based abstract drawings

Linda Karshan (born 1947) is an American artist. Karshan is known for her performance-based abstract drawings.

Her work is included in the collections of the Tate Gallery, London, the Harvard Art Museums and the Walker Art Center, Minneapolis,

In 2021 she donated a significant collection of drawings to the Courtauld Gallery, in the name of her late husband Howard Karshan.
