= Samuel Timmins =

19th-century British Shakespearean scholar and antiquarian

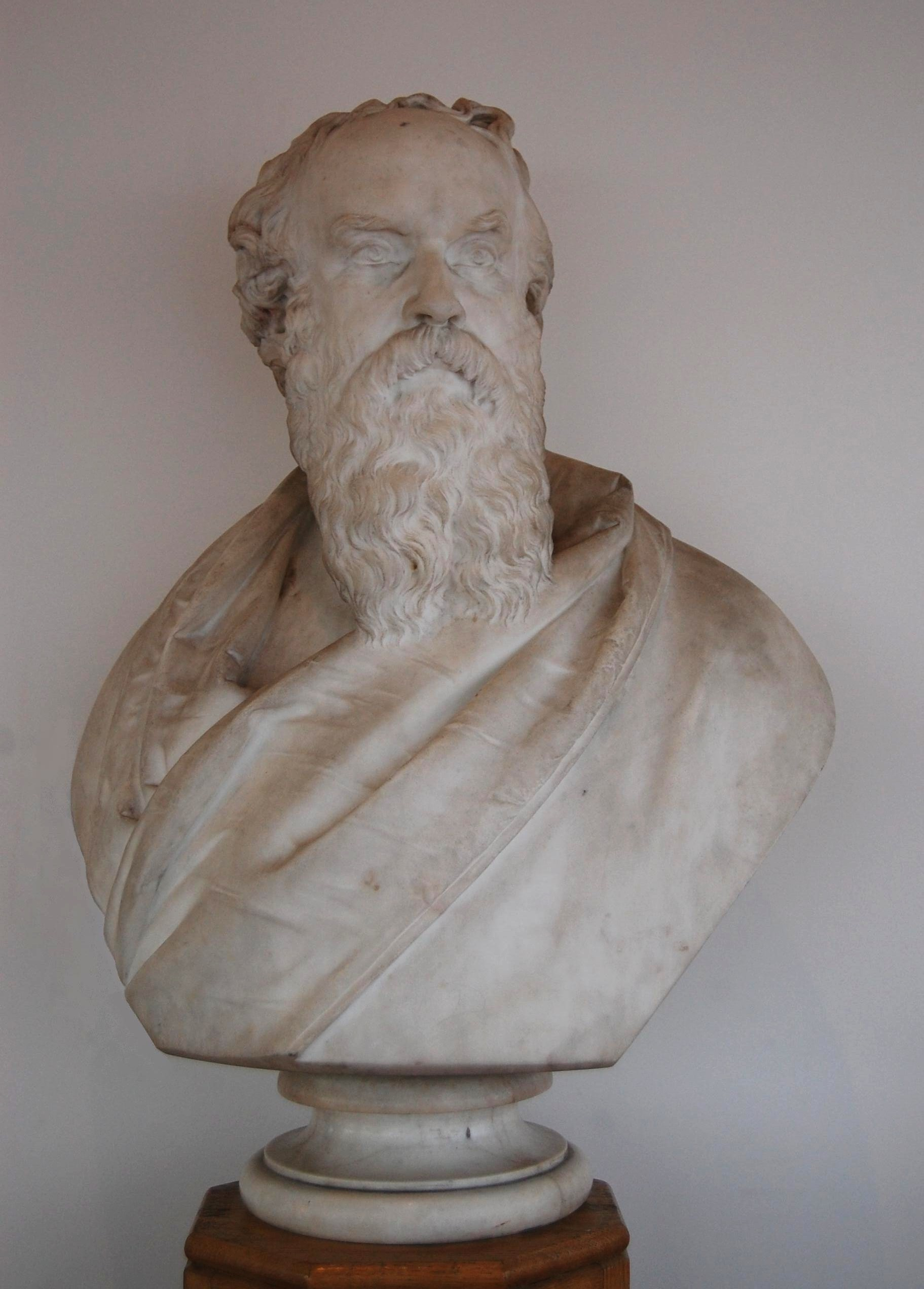
- Bust, by Francis John Williamson, in the Library of Birmingham
- Born: 27 February 1826
- Died: 12 November 1902 (aged 76)
- Occupation(s): Shakespearean scholar and antiquarian

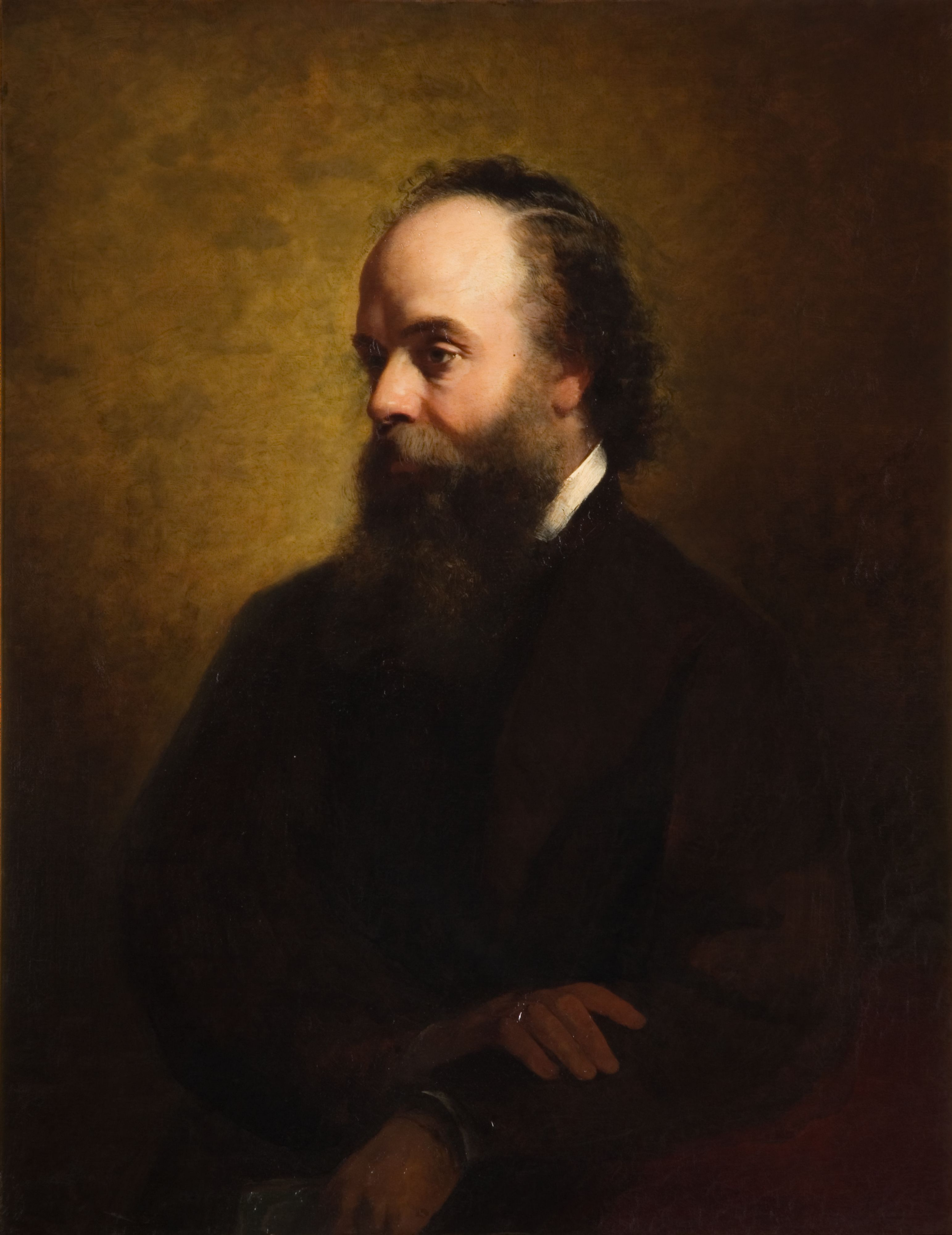
Portrait (circa 1875–1880) by William Thomas Roden, now in the collection of Birmingham Museum and Art Gallery

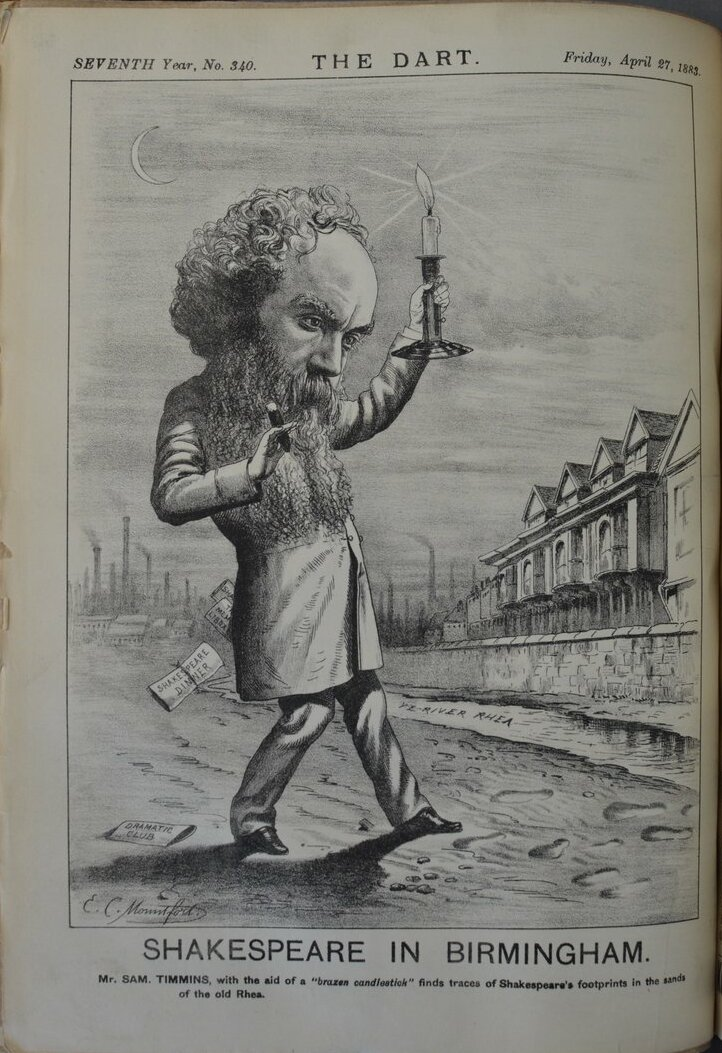
Cartoon by E. C. Mountfort in The Dart, 27 April 1883 edition, captioned "Shakespeare in Birmingham - Mr. Sam. Timmins, with the aid of a "brazen candlestick" finds traces of Shakespeare's footprints in the sands of the old Rhea.", using an archaic spelling of Birmingham's River Rea

Samuel Timmins (27 February 1826 – 12 November 1902) was a British Shakespearean scholar and antiquarian. He was invariably known as Sam Timmins, and signed himself "Sam: Timmins", using a colon for abbreviation in early modern style.

He inherited a family business, founded in 1790 by his grandfather Richard Timmins, and based in Hurst Street, as a manufacturer of steel "toys" (i.e. small items such as hinges, buckles and hooks). His true passion, however, was literature; and towards the end of his life he depended for his income as much on his literary output as on his business.

In about 1858, Timmins, the nonconformist preacher George Dawson, J. T. Bunce, J. H. Chamberlain, William Harris, and others in their circle, began to meet for literary and cultural discussions. By 1860, these meetings had been regularised into a more formal club, which in 1862 was named "Our Shakespeare Club". H. R. G. Whates calls Our Shakespeare Club "the intellectual centre of the community, [and] the nineteenth century equivalent of the famous Lunar Society". One of the principal achievements of the club, and of Timmins in particular, was the establishment of the Shakespeare Memorial Library within the Central Library in 1864 (the tercentenary year of Shakespeare's birth). The library included a portrait bust of Timmins by F. J. Williamson. The original contents of this library were lost in a fire during 1879, when Timmins was seen sobbing at the destruction. A new Shakespeare Library was created within the new Reference Library built in 1881, and a copy of the bust restored there.

In 1890, Timmins was elected an International Member of the American Philosophical Society.

Timmins died on 12 November 1902, aged 76, and was buried in Key Hill Cemetery, Hockley, Birmingham.
