= John Henry Chamberlain =

British architect

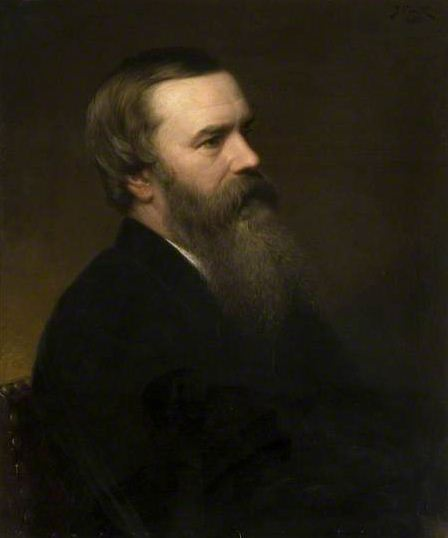
- Born: 21 June 1831; Leicester, England
- Died: 22 October 1883 (aged 52); Birmingham, England
- Occupation: Architect
- Practice: Martin & Chamberlain
- Buildings: Birmingham School of Art; Highbury Hall
- Projects: Birmingham board schools Corporation Street

John Henry Chamberlain (21 June 1831 – 22 October 1883), generally known professionally as J. H. Chamberlain, was a British nineteenth-century architect based in Birmingham.

Working predominantly in the Victorian Gothic style, he was one of the earliest and foremost practical exponents of the ideas of architectural theorist John Ruskin, who selected Chamberlain as one of the trustees of his Guild of St George. Chamberlain's later work was increasingly influenced by the early Arts and Crafts movement.

The majority of Chamberlain's buildings were located in and around Birmingham, where he was a major figure in civic life and an influential friend of many of the Liberal elite who dominated the city under Mayor Joseph Chamberlain (to whom he was unrelated).

== Life ==
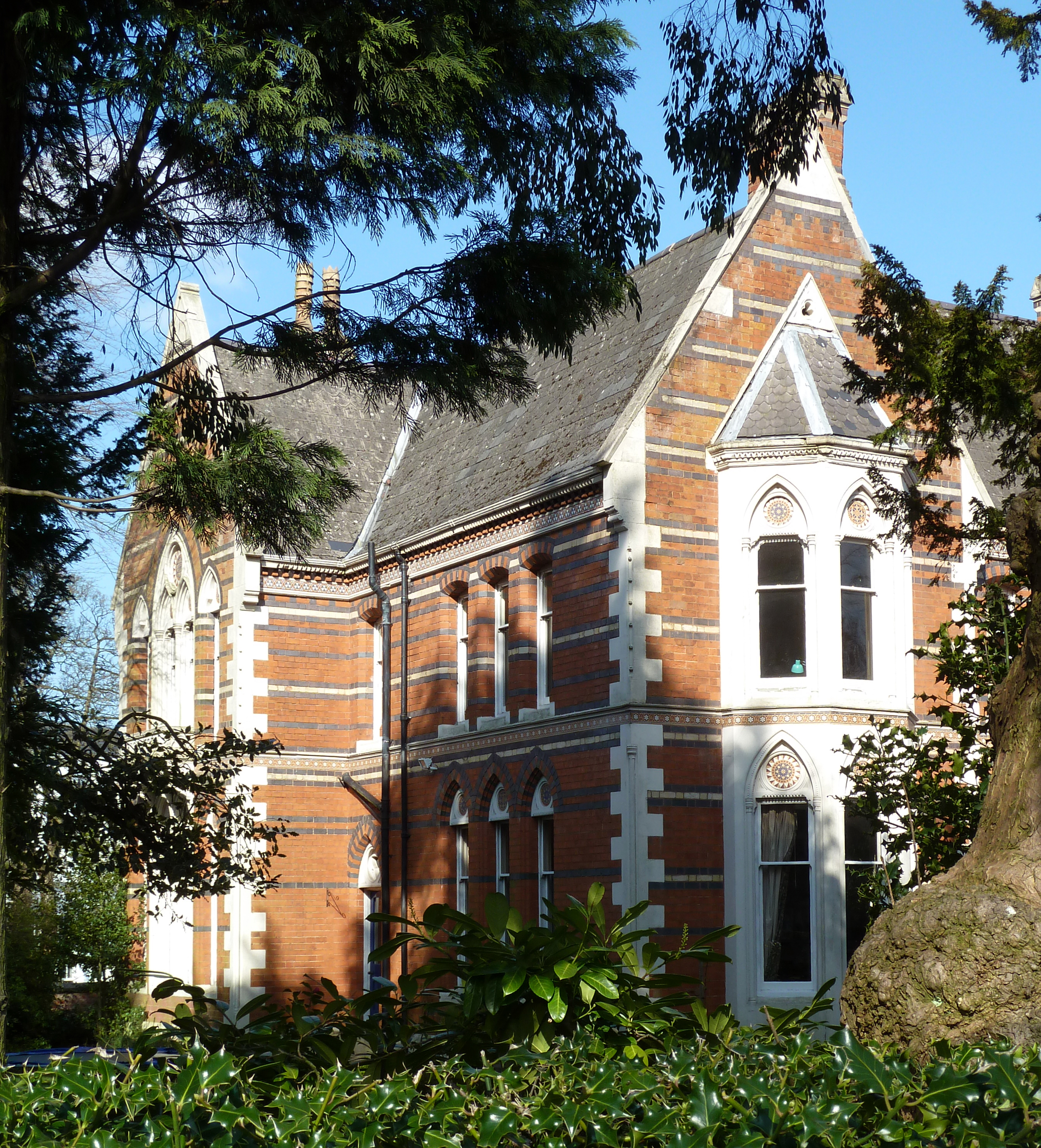
Shenstone House of 1855: Chamberlain's first building in Birmingham, and the first High Victorian building in the town

Chamberlain was born in Leicester on 21 June 1831, son of a Baptist minister, and received his architectural training with a local practice. After further experience in London and a period travelling in Italy he moved to Birmingham in 1853. He designed two buildings for John Eld, the business partner of his uncle. The first of these to be completed, Eld's house at 12 Ampton Road, Edgbaston (1855) survives to this day and already shows many of the features that would characterise much of Chamberlain's later work: a gothic structure in polychromatic brick with finely crafted decoration inspired by natural and organic forms. The shop at 28–29 Union Street for Eld & Chamberlain has been demolished.

In the late 1850s, he entered into a partnership with William Harris. This was short-lived, but the two men remained friends, and, in later years, Harris would marry Chamberlain's widow.

Although Chamberlain continued to build in both Leicester and Birmingham (where he built the Edgbaston Waterworks whose tower would inspire the young J. R. R. Tolkien) his career failed to take off, and in 1864 he considered moving to New Zealand after being offered a commission to design Christchurch Cathedral.

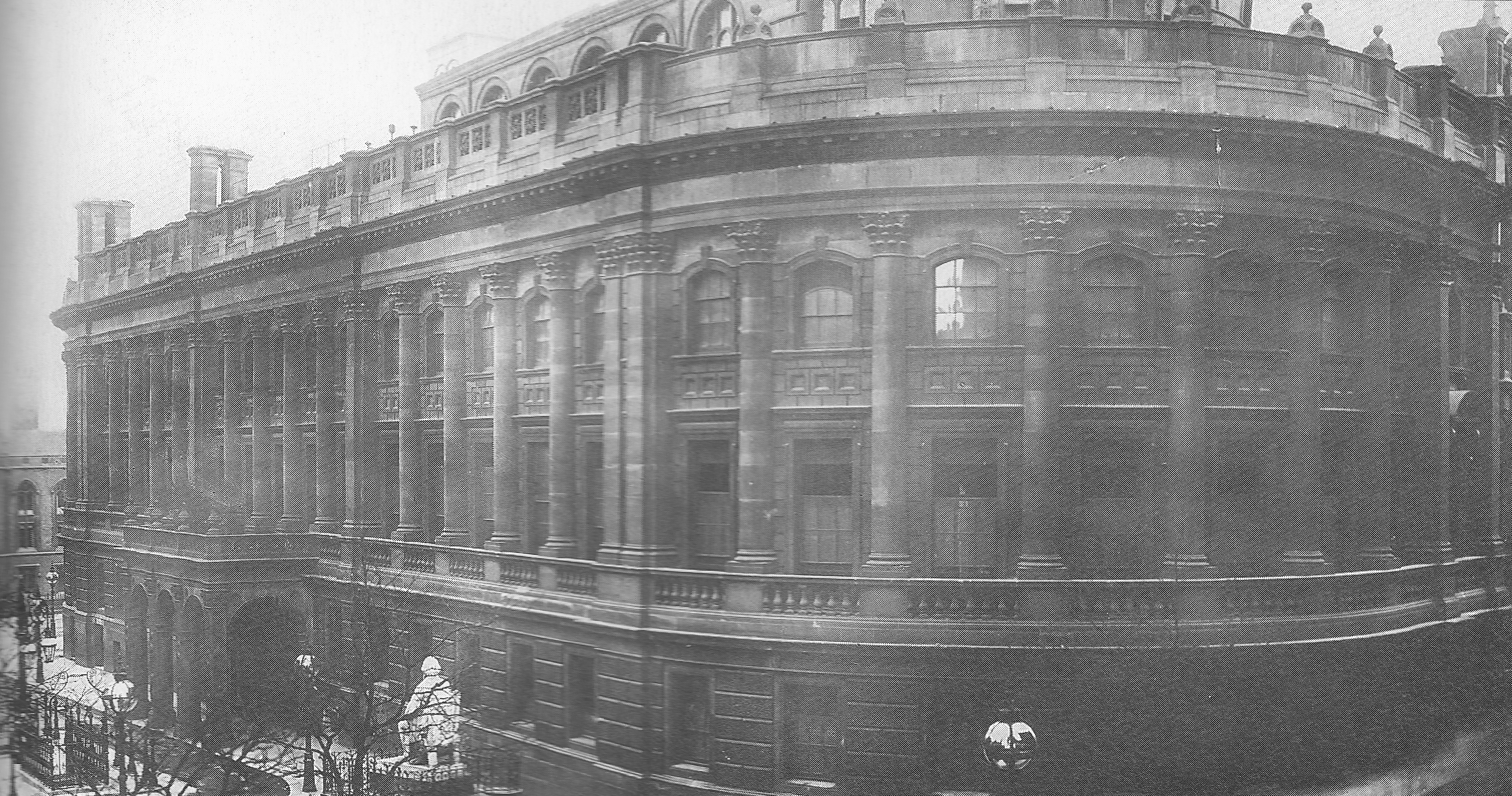
The rebuilt Central Library of 1882, demolished in 1974

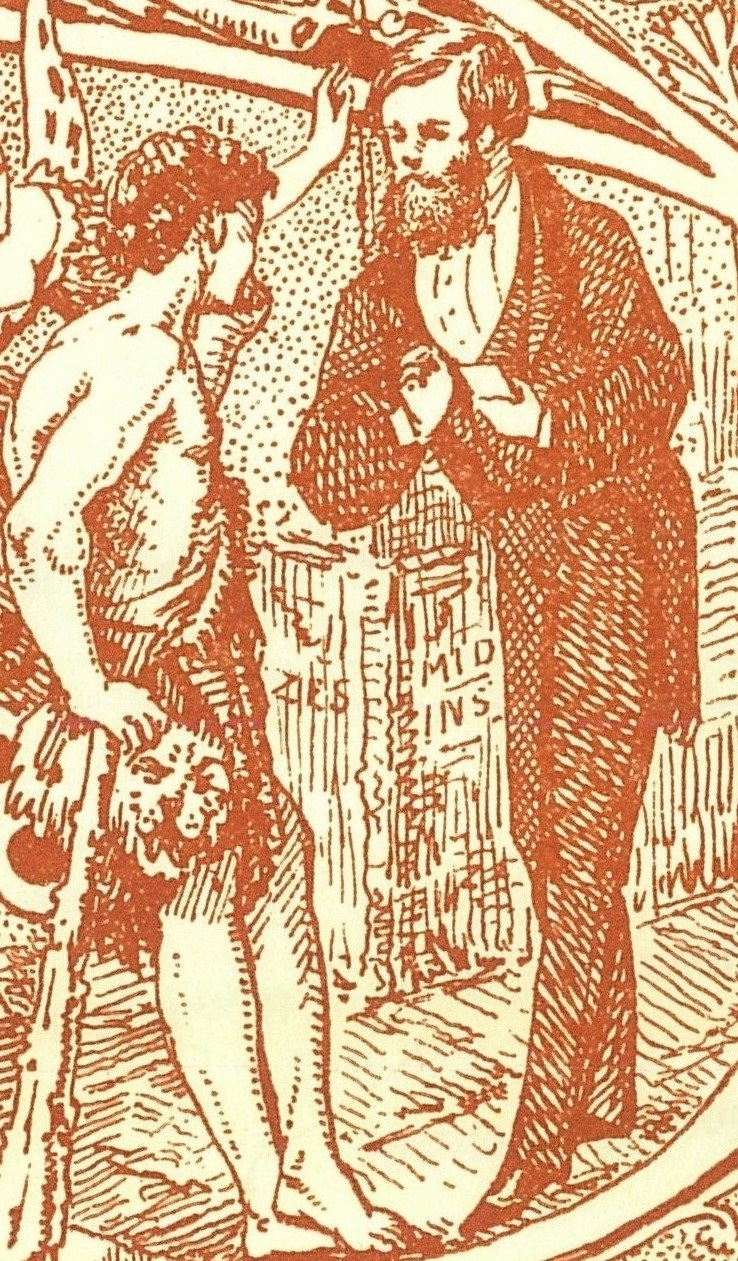
Chamberlain enrolling Hercules as a member of the Birmingham and Midland Institute: detail from an 1866 leaflet

Instead he went into partnership with William Martin who was already established as the city's public works architect. Chamberlain took the lead in design matters, while Martin saw to the more practical side of running an architectural practice.

Chamberlain's belief in the value of individual craftsmanship and patterns inspired by nature (characteristic of the Arts and Crafts movement) together with his sense of urbanism and the civilising potential of cities (that was much less typical of a movement which generally abhorred the Industrial Revolution and viewed large cities as dehumanising) chimed perfectly with the progressive non-conformist ideology – dubbed the "Civic Gospel" – of Birmingham's ruling liberals, who sought to transform industrial Birmingham into a cultural centre to rival the great European capitals.

Together with Martin's contacts and business acumen this saw the partnership win a string of commissions to design civic structures throughout Birmingham, including libraries, hospitals, public utilities, major projects such as the cutting of Corporation Street and culminating in 1871 with a commission to design no fewer than 41 board schools in response to the Elementary Education Act 1870. Among the most important buildings were the Birmingham Institute of Art and Design in Paradise Street, and the Free Libraries in Edmund Street.

Chamberlain became the unofficial domestic architect to Birmingham's civic leaders, designing a string of prestigious houses in upmarket districts of South Birmingham, including Highbury Hall, the home of Joseph Chamberlain himself.

He served from 1865 until his death as Honorary Secretary and on the Council of the Birmingham and Midland Institute. He was also responsible for an extension to the Institute's building, completed in 1881.

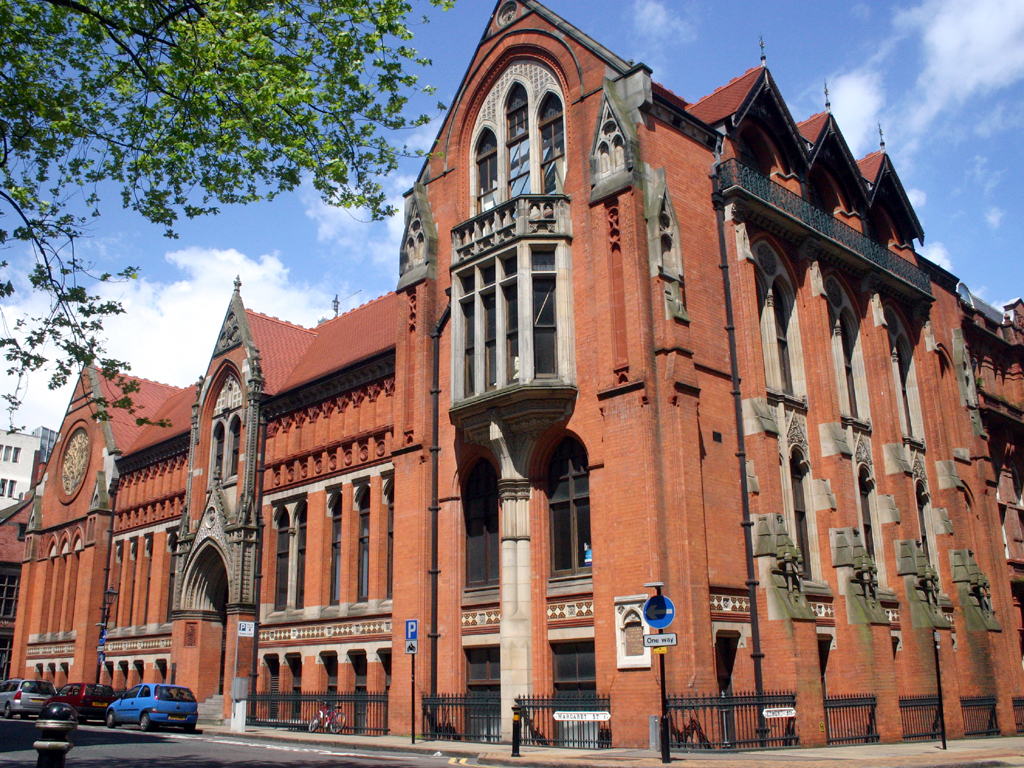
Birmingham School of Art, now part of Birmingham City University

Shortly before his death he completed the designs for what is generally considered his finest building – the Birmingham School of Art. The building was subsequently completed by William Martin and his son Frederick.

== Death and burial ==
Chamberlain died suddenly on 22 October 1883, immediately after delivering an evening lecture at the Birmingham and Midland Institute. His subject was "Exotic Art", and he concluded by quoting Alfred, Lord Tennyson's poem "Amphion":

And I must work thro' months of toil,
And years of cultivation,
Upon my proper patch of soil
To grow my own plantation.
I'll take the showers as they fall,
I will not vex my bosom:
Enough if at the end of all
A little garden blossom.

He afterwards left the lecture room, but when he reached the home of Lawson Tait fainted away and died.

The Institute's Report for 1883 commented: "Under his guidance the Institute has undergone development that is truly marvellous; he had genius to see the needs of the time and the direction in which the Institute could be developed to meet them. The wisdom of his counsel, the extent and variety of his knowledge, the grace of his eloquence and the wonderful charm of his personal presence made him a colleague whom it is impossible to replace."

He is buried in Key Hill Cemetery, Hockley, in Birmingham's Jewellery Quarter.

== Personal life ==
In 1859, Chamberlain married Anna Mary Abrahams, daughter of Rev. George Abrahams. Following Chamberlain's death, she married his former professional partner, William Harris, in 1888.

== Significant works ==
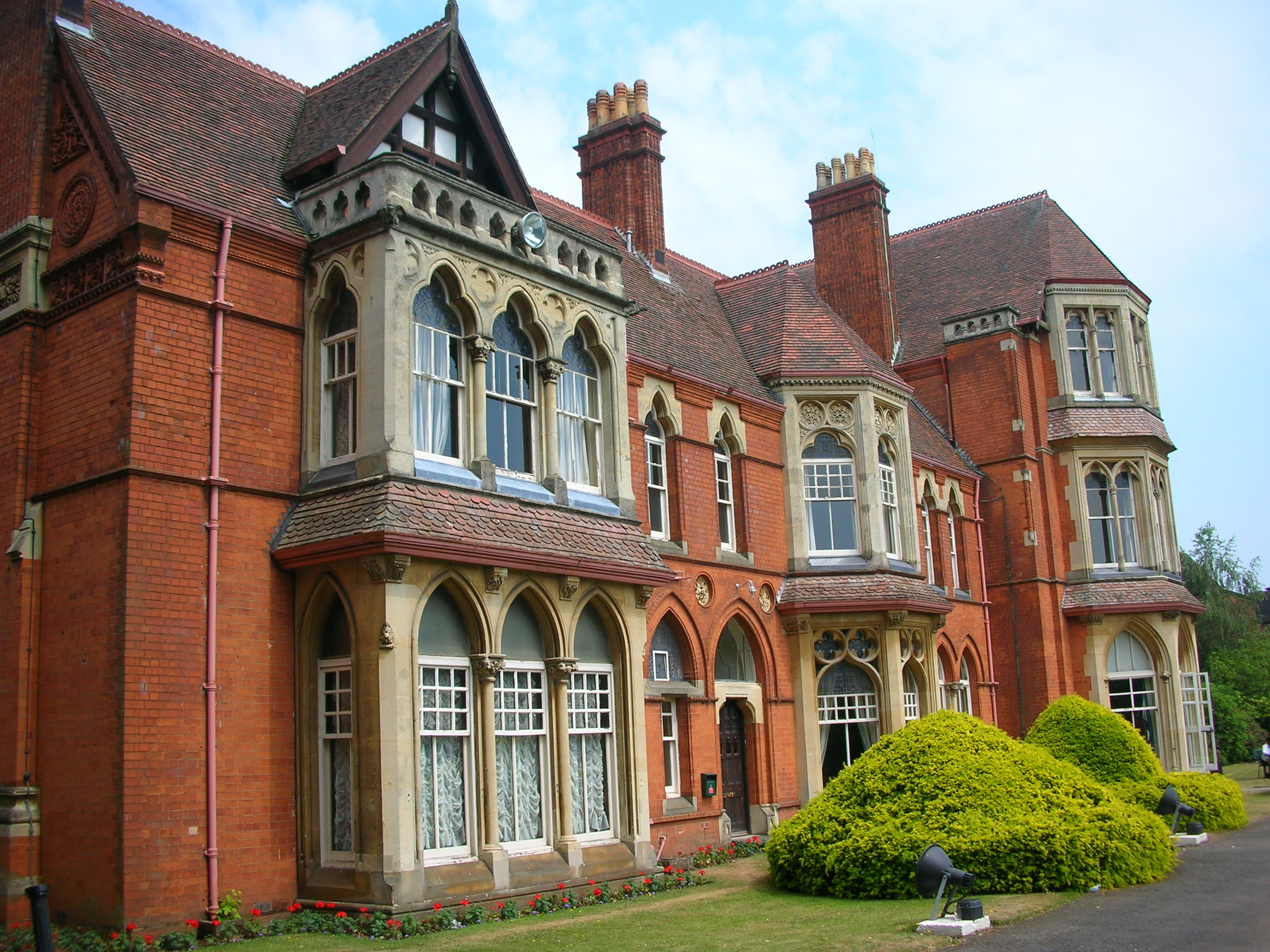
Highbury Hall, Moseley, commissioned by Joseph Chamberlain

- 12 Ampton Road (Shenstone House), Edgbaston – Chamberlain's first house; "the first High Victorian house in the town"
- The Birmingham & Midlands Institute, Paradise Street façade (1881); "exhuberant gothic style" - demolished 1966.
- Birmingham Central Library (1882) – Demolished in 1974.
- Chamberlain Memorial, Birmingham (1882)
- 136–138 Edmund Street, Birmingham (1875)
- The Grove, Harborne, Birmingham (demolished; one room preserved as "The Harborne Room" at the Victoria and Albert Museum, London)
- Highbury Hall, Moseley, Birmingham.
- Oozells Street Board School (now the Ikon Gallery), Brindleyplace, Birmingham City Centre.
- Shakespeare Memorial Room in Birmingham Central Library (1882). Dismantled in 1974; reassembled in the new Central Library in 1983; relocated to the top floor of the Library of Birmingham in 2013.
- Birmingham School of Art, Margaret Street, Birmingham (1881). Designed by Chamberlain but completed by William Martin on Chamberlain's death.

== Sources ==
- Boase, G. C.; Brooks, Michael W. (revised) (2004). "Chamberlain, John Henry (1831–1883)". Oxford Dictionary of National Biography (online ed.). Oxford University Press. doi:10.1093/ref:odnb/5047. (Subscription or UK public library membership required.)
- Foster, Andy (2005). Birmingham. Pevsner Architectural Guides. New Haven/London: Yale University Press. ISBN 0-300-10731-5.
- Holyoak, Joe (2009). "John Henry Chamberlain". In Ballard, Phillada (ed.). Birmingham's Victorian and Edwardian Architects. Wetherby: Oblong. pp. 153–81. ISBN 978-0-9556576-2-7.
- Boase, George Clement (1887). "Chamberlain, John Henry" . In Stephen, Leslie (ed.). Dictionary of National Biography. Vol. 10. London: Smith, Elder & Co. pp. 2–3.
