= George Dawson (preacher) =

19th-century English nonconformist preacher, lecturer and activist

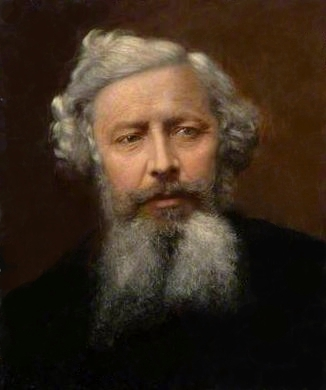

Personal details
- Born: 24 February 1821 London, England
- Died: 30 November 1876 (aged 55) Kings Norton, Birmingham, England
- Buried: Key Hill Cemetery, Birmingham
- Denomination: Nonconformist Christian
- Education: Marischal College, Aberdeen
- Alma mater: University of Glasgow

George Dawson (24 February 1821 – 30 November 1876) was an English nonconformist preacher, lecturer and activist. He was an influential voice in the calls for radical political and social reform in Birmingham, a philosophy that became known as the Civic Gospel.

== Ministry ==
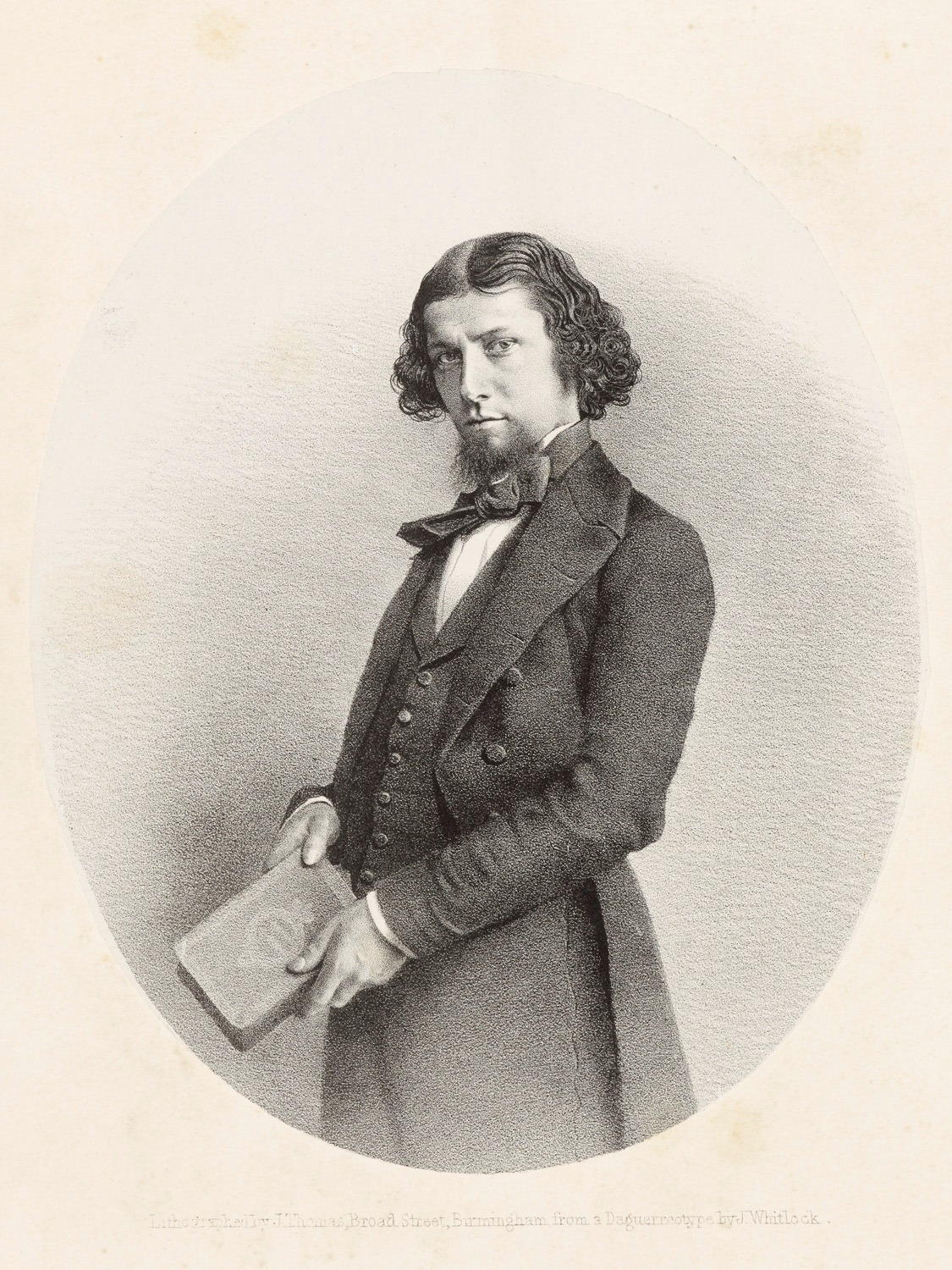
An engraving of Dawson, c.1852

Dawson was born in Brunswick Square, London, in 1821. His father was headmaster of a Baptist school. He was educated at home, then at Marischal College, Aberdeen, and the University of Glasgow. Oxford and Cambridge seemed not an option as, owing to the Test Act, for centuries up to 1828 only Anglicans were allowed to matriculate (Oxford) or graduate (Cambridge).

In 1843 Dawson accepted a call to the pastorate of the Baptist church at Rickmansworth. He moved to the rapidly expanding industrial town of Birmingham in 1844 to become minister of the Mount Zion Baptist Chapel where the eloquence and beliefs that the young man expressed soon attracted a large following.

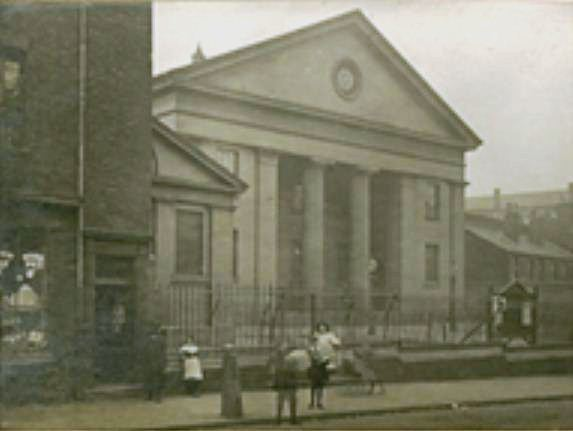
The Unitarian Church of the Saviour in Edward Street, Birmingham (1847–1895)

However, Dawson's views did not fit the orthodoxy of the Baptist church, so in 1845 he left, followed by much of his congregation, to become minister of the theologically liberal Church of the Saviour, a Unitarian church erected for him by his supporters, where "no pledge was required, of minister or congregation; no form of belief was implied by membership; no difference in creed was allowed to bar union in practical Christian work".

The key doctrine preached there was inscribed on a marble tablet above the entrance: "There is but one law – thou shalt love the Lord thy God with all thy heart, and thy neighbour as thyself."

=== Civic Gospel ===
In the Church of the Saviour, Dawson developed the concept of the Civic Gospel. He called upon his congregation to join him in the struggle "to improve conditions in the town and the quality of life enjoyed by its citizens". His sermons were unconventional for the time, it was said that Dawson "preached not as a dying man to dying men – that was the old idea of preaching – but as a living man to living men who found life no simple or easy matter". His sermons electrified the Birmingham public and influential members of his Church included Joseph Chamberlain (who took Sunday School and oversaw the accounts), Jesse Collings, George Dixon, J. A. Langford, Robert Martineau, Samuel Timmins, William Harris, A. F. Osler, and the Kenrick family, all of whom played an important part in local affairs and took on his ideals. Between 1847 and 1867, 17 members of his congregation were elected to the Town Council, six of whom were elected mayor.

From his pulpit and in public lectures and articles, Dawson advised Christians (particularly people experienced in business) to become councillors and help transform the City, a call which Joseph Chamberlain answered in his work first as Councillor, then as a visionary social reforming Mayor. His idea of the civic gospel and his advocacy of free education was strongly supported by the Congregational spokesman Dr. R. W. Dale, and by J. T. Bunce, influential editor of the Birmingham Daily Post. Both Dawson and Dale were disqualified as ministers from seats on the town council, but both served on the Birmingham school board. Dawson strongly advocated to the worshippers in his Church and in Birmingham the idea of service in politics as a civic duty and as service to God.

Dawson's radicalism did not meet with universal approval. A correspondent writing to Aris's Birmingham Gazette in 1847 described him as a person "whose views and proceedings are calculated to produce considerable mischief"; and as "a young man who ... has prided and plumed himself upon more than he possesses and has consequently fallen into great and grievous errors".

== Views ==
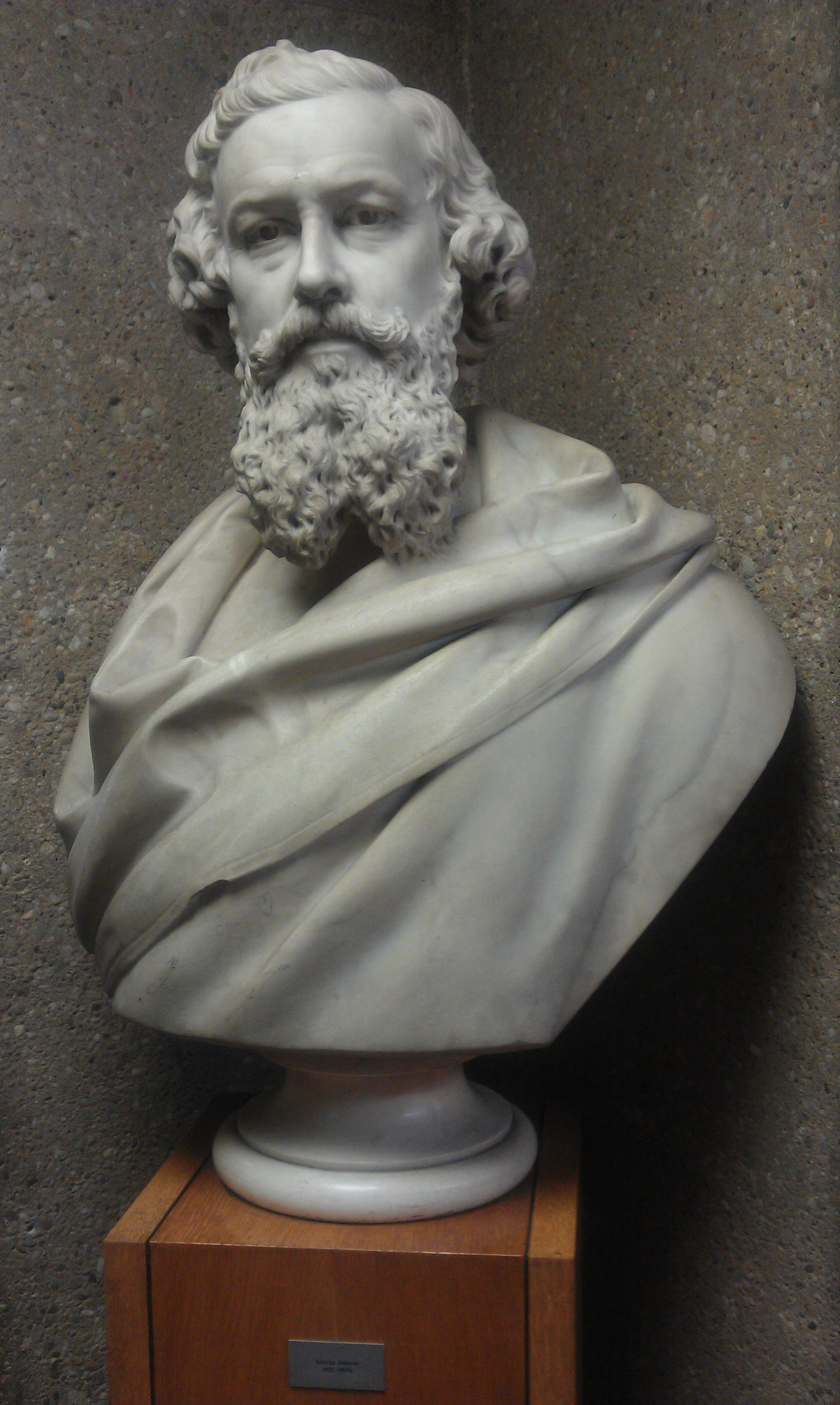
Bust of Dawson in the Library of Birmingham

Dawson did not consider himself to be a Unitarian, although modern Unitarians count him as one of their own (he is listed by the Midland Unitarian Union as a great nineteenth-century Unitarian). He left the Baptist Church to be free of any definite creed or doctrinal rigidity.

"True Religion", Dawson believed, was "social, unitive, and brotherly in its spirit: it produces the church as its social development". For him, Christianity was "a set of fruitful principles", not a code of laws or a theological dogma.

== Other interests ==
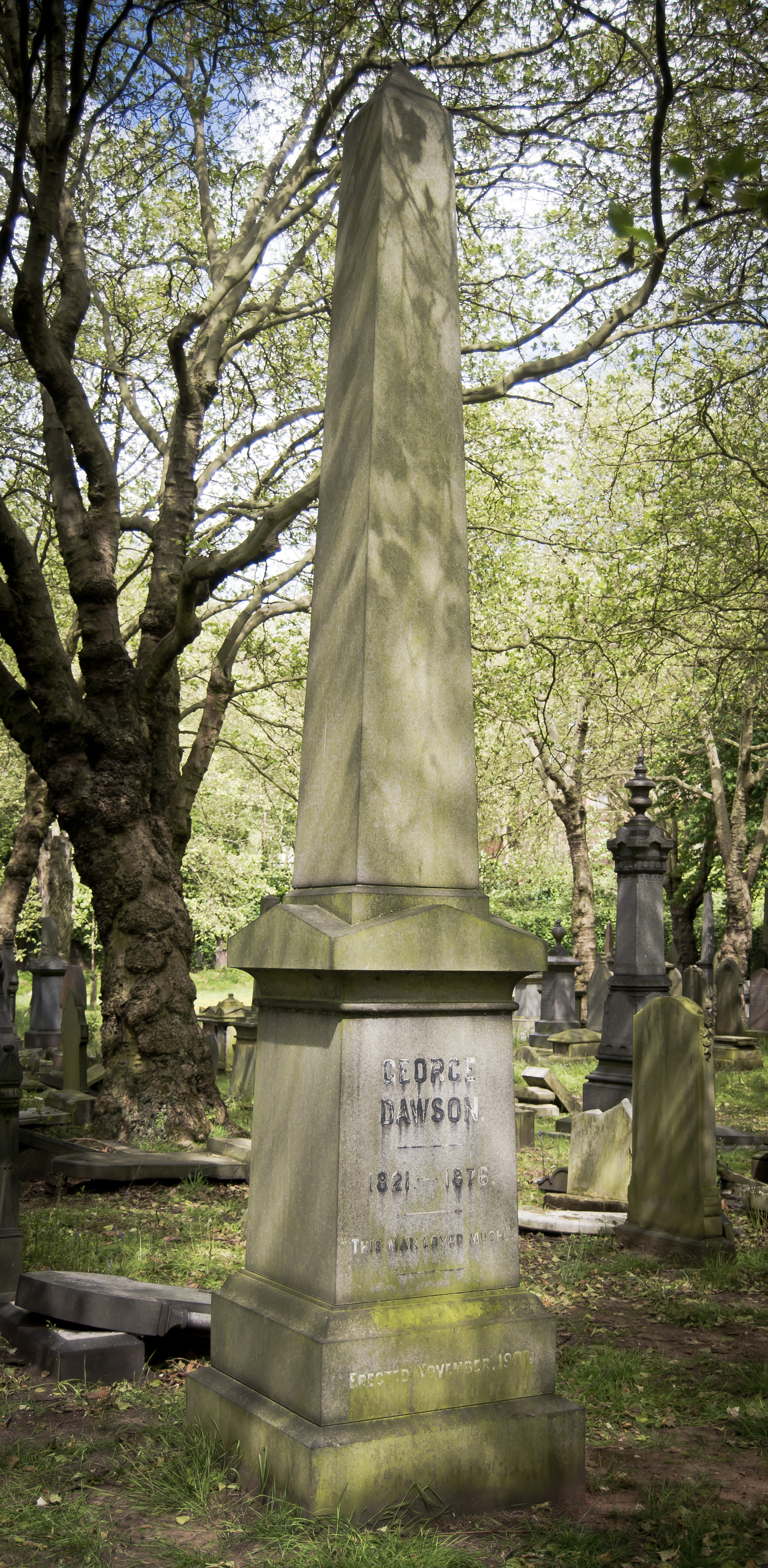
Dawson's memorial in Key Hill Cemetery

Dawson was famous during his lifetime for lecturing on a wide range of subjects from Shakespeare to German poetry, Italian history to good etiquette. He became a national figure, in demand as a lecturer throughout the country. Charles Kingsley described him as "the greatest talker in England". Dawson was a friend of Carlyle and Emerson and did a great deal to popularize their teachings, especially in his demand for a high ethical standard in everyday life and his insistence that citizenship needed a specifically Christian approach.

Dawson also lectured on English literature at the Birmingham and Midland Institute and helped to found the Shakespeare Memorial Library in Birmingham. His address at the opening of the Birmingham Reference Library gives a flavour of what the civic gospel meant to the Victorian municipal activists:

The opening of this glorious library, the first fruits of a clear understanding that a great town exists to discharge towards the people of that town the duties that a great nation exists to discharge towards the people of that nation – that a town exists here by the grace of God, that a great town is a solemn organism through which should flow, and in which should be shaped, all the highest, loftiest, and truest ends of man's intellectual and moral nature... We are a Corporation, who have undertaken the highest duty that is possible to us; we have made provision for our people – for all our people – and we have made a provision of God's greatest and best gifts unto Man.

Dawson died suddenly at Kings Norton on 30 November 1876 and was buried in Key Hill Cemetery.

Four volumes of Dawson's Sermons, two of Prayers and two of Biographical Lectures were published after his death.

== Personal life ==
Dawson married Susan Fanny Crompton (1820–1878) in 1846. They had two children, Rachel Annie (1846–1873) and Bernard (1851–1900). Rachel, "from some inexplicable arrest in the bones of her skull at an early age ... was almost an imbecile". Her early death in May 1873 sent Dawson into a temporary fit of depression.

== Published biography ==
Following Dawson's death in 1876, his friend Sam Timmins was asked to write his biography, with additional contributions to be provided by G. J. Johnson, J. D. Morell (a contemporary of Dawson at the University of Glasgow) and J. H. Chamberlain. Timmins began to gather materials, but "it was a long time before any part of his manuscript was sent to the printer's"; and, when it was, it was destroyed in a fire. Timmins lost enthusiasm – "all the eagerness with which he undertook the task had oozed away" – and the work remained unfinished at his death in 1902. The task and materials passed to Wright Wilson (son of Joseph Wilson, another of Dawson's friends) and was eventually published in 1905, including the contributions from Johnson, Morell and Chamberlain, another from Sebastian Evans, and a reprinted newspaper article by David Christie Murray.

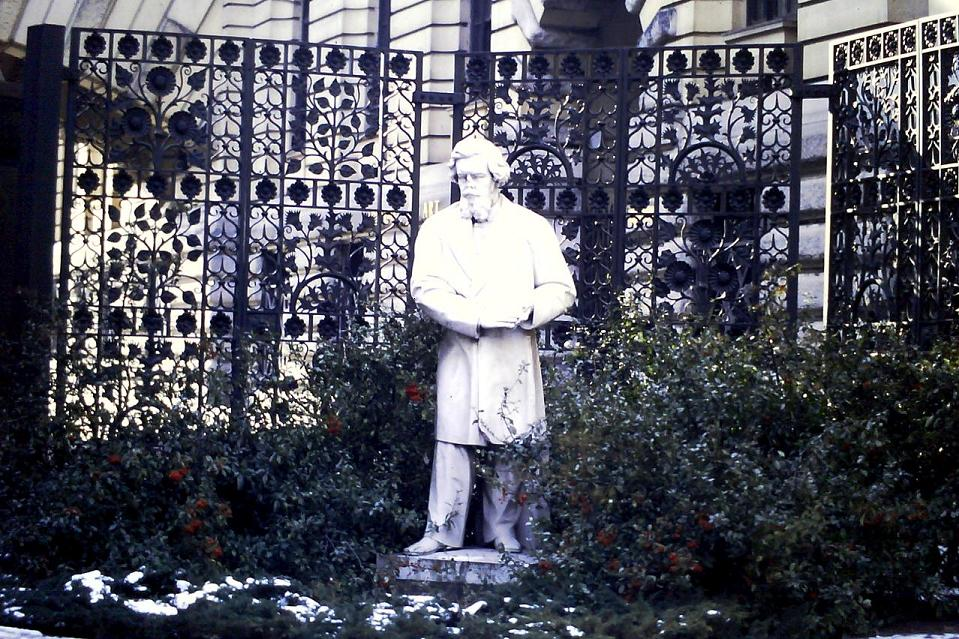
The statue of George Dawson when in Edmund Street

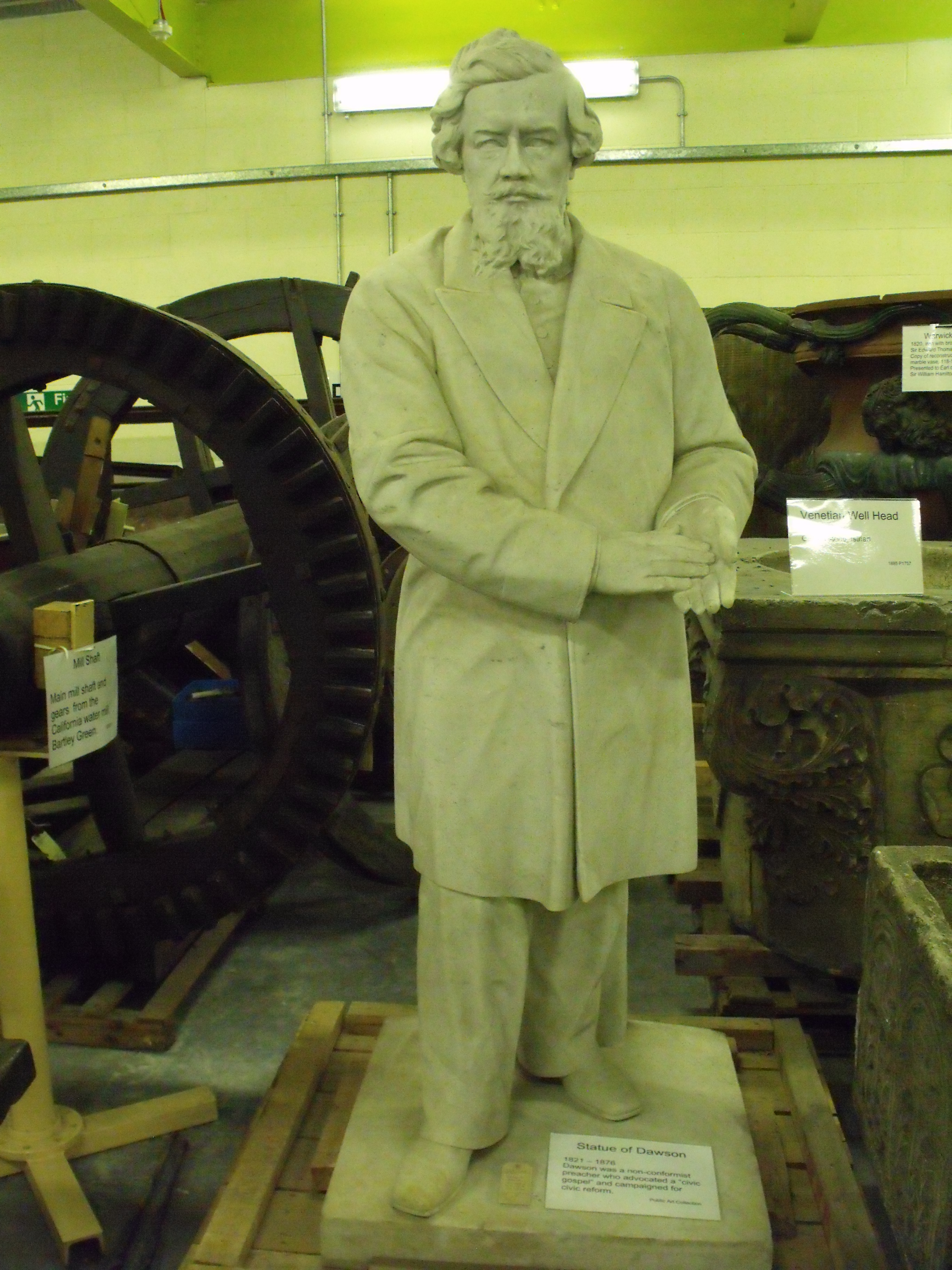
The statue of Dawson now in storage at the Birmingham Museum Collections Centre

== Commemoration ==
A statue of Dawson formerly stood in Victoria Square, Birmingham; and later in Edmund Street, nearby. It is currently in store at Birmingham Museum and Art Gallery's Museum Collections Centre, awaiting restoration and repair.

A bust of Dawson is now on the ninth floor of the Library of Birmingham.

A room is named after him at The Birmingham & Midland Institute.

== Bibliography ==
- Records: Church of the Saviour Founded and built 1847–95; Library of Birmingham (258925; 259532; 260167 George Dawson Collection; 264036).
- Briggs, Asa (1990) [1963]. Victorian Cities (3rd ed.). London: Penguin Books. ISBN 0140135820.
- Crosskey, Henry William (1876). The Memory of George Dawson: a discourse delivered in the Church of the Messiah, Birmingham, on the 3rd December, 1876, etc. Birmingham: E. C. Osborne.
- Dale, A. W. W.; Fairbairn, A. M.; Rogers, J. G. (1899). The Life of R. W. Dale, of Birmingham. London: Hodder and Stoughton.
- Dale, R. W. (August 1877). "George Dawson: politician, lecturer, and preacher". The Nineteenth Century. 2: 44–61.
- Hennock, E. P. (1973). Fit and Proper Persons: ideal and reality in nineteenth-century urban government. London: Edward Arnold. ISBN 0-7131-5665-1.
- Hunt, Tristram (2004). Building Jerusalem: the rise and fall of the Victorian city. London: Weidenfeld and Nicolson. pp. 232–265. ISBN 0297607677.
- Marsh, Peter (1994). Joseph Chamberlain: entrepreneur in politics. New Haven, Mass: Yale University Press.
- Plant, Helen (2000). "Ye are all one in Christ Jesus: aspects of Unitarianism and feminism in Birmingham, c. 1869–90". Women's History Review. 9 (4): 721–42. doi:10.1080/09612020000200533.
- Sellers, Ian (2013) [2004]. "Dawson, George (1821–1876)". Oxford Dictionary of National Biography (online ed.). Oxford University Press. doi:10.1093/ref:odnb/7347. (Subscription, Wikipedia Library access or UK public library membership required.)
- Skipp, Victor (1983). "George Dawson and the Civic Gospel". The Making of Victorian Birmingham. Yardley. pp. 153–8. ISBN 0-9506998-3-7.
- Wilson, William Wright (1905). The Life of George Dawson, M.A. Glasgow (2nd ed.). Birmingham: Percival Jones.
