= Martineau Gardens =

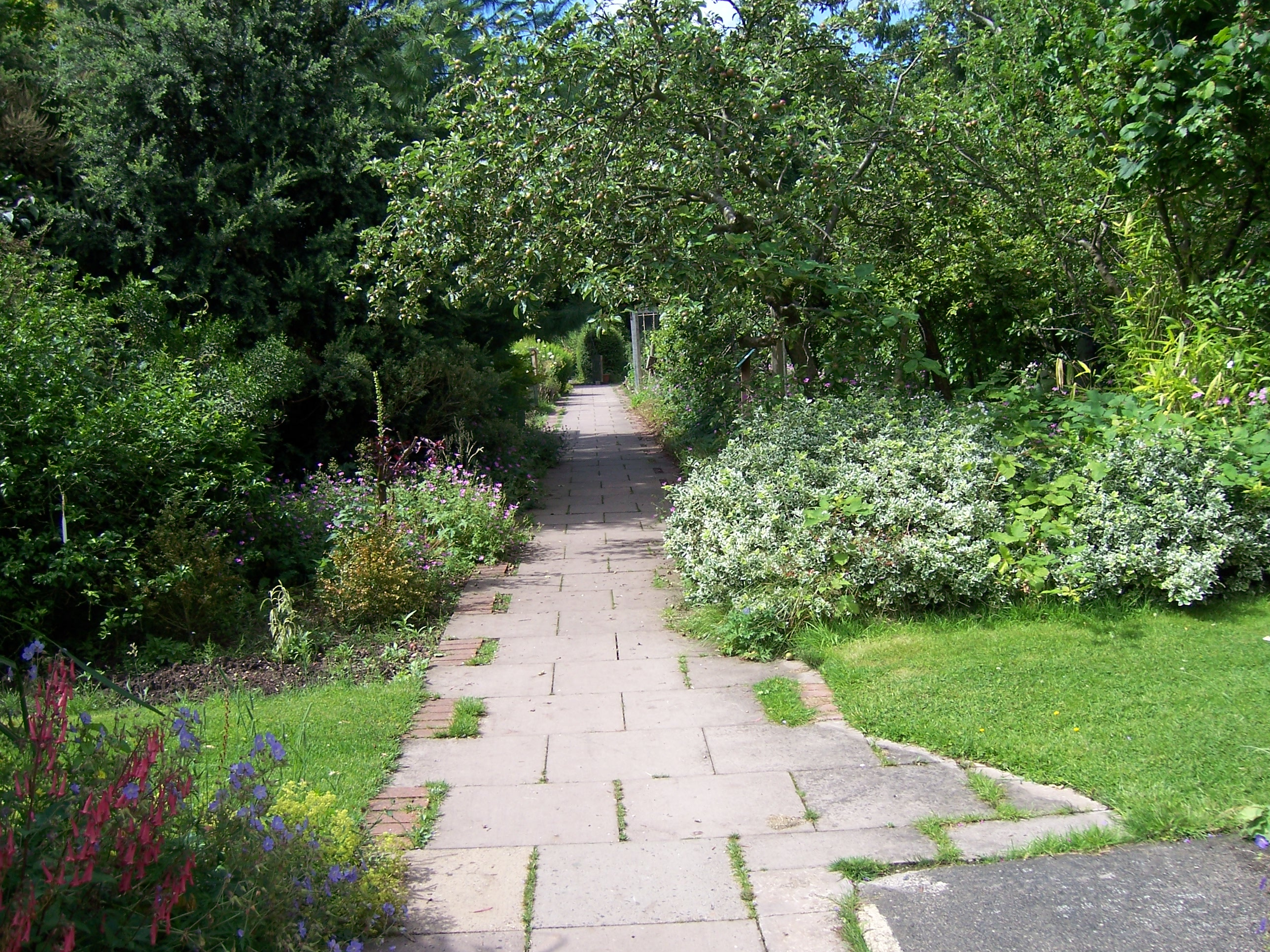
- Interactive map of Martineau Gardens
- Location: Priory Road, near the intersection of Bristol Road, Edgbaston, Birmingham, England
- Coordinates: 52°27′25″N 1°54′42″W
- Area: 2 acres (0.81 ha)
- Awards: Green Flag Award

Martineau Gardens is a community garden on Priory Road in Edgbaston, Birmingham, England. It adjoins the Priory Hospital on Bristol Road. It features over two acres of woodland and formal gardens. The Gardens are administered by a registered charity and are a member of the Federation of City Farms and Community Gardens.

== Wildlife ==
The gardens are designated a Site of Local Importance for Nature Conservation (SLINC).

== Awards ==
The Gardens have been awarded a Green Flag Award in 2010, 2011 and 2012, in recognition of being a well-kept 'green space'.
