= Birmingham Philosophical Institution =

- Formation: 1800
- Type: Learned society
- Headquarters: Birmingham
- Location: United Kingdom
- Official language: English

The Birmingham Philosophical Institution was a society established in Birmingham, England for the exchange of scientific knowledge.

The Institution was established in either 1800 or 1803 (sources are uncertain) in cramped premises in Cannon Street, Birmingham and owed its early existence to the generosity of George Barker, a scientifically minded local philanthropist. Lectures were given on a wide range of subjects.

One of the Institution's early successes was to bring about the foundation of the Institution for the Instruction of the Deaf and Dumb following one of their lectures. Another was their sponsorship of the development of the first successful self-recording pressure-plate anemometer and rain-gauge by A. Follett Osler, a local glass manufacturer, which revolutionised the keeping of meteorological records. The original instrument was first put to use at the Institution's own premises and quickly replicated at several other sites, including Greenwich Observatory.

The Institution was finally wound up in 1852 and its place taken in 1854 by the Birmingham and Midland Institute.

== Notable members ==
Some notable members were:

- James Timmins Chase
- John Corrie FRS (President 1807 and 1812–39) – uncle of Samuel Carter
- William Ick (the Institution's first curator)
- Joseph Frederick Ledsam
- George Frederic Muntz
- A. Follett Osler
