= Exhibition of Industrial Arts and Manufacturers =

Overview
- BIE-class: Unrecognized exposition
- Name: Exhibition of Industrial Arts and Manufacturers
- Visitors: 100 000

Location
- Country: United Kingdom of Great Britain and Ireland
- City: Birmingham
- Venue: Temporary building in Bingley House grounds
- Coordinates: 52°28′44.40″N 1°54′38.84″W

Timeline
- Opening: 3 September 1849
- Closure: 15 December 1849

The Exhibition of Industrial Arts and Manufacturers was held in 1849 in Birmingham between 3 September until 15 December 1849. It was held in a temporary two storey building in the grounds of the former Bingley House.

== Visitors ==
There were 100 000 visitors, including Charles Darwin and Robert Stephenson. Prince Albert, who was already planning an 1851 exhibition with Henry Cole, visited on 1 November, and got the model for the Great Exhibition in 1851.

== Displays ==
There were 131 displays in the main hall. There was a 2 tier, 20 feet high candelabrum from Osler. Hardman & Co., in collaboration with Augustus Pugin displayed church furniture and stained glass. Chance Brothers showed three large painted windows, intended eventually for the church at Warstone Lane Cemetery. Cadbury Brothers showed cocoa, chicory, homeopathic cocoa, chocolate including vanilla eating chocolate.
