= William Ick =

Welsh botanist and geologist

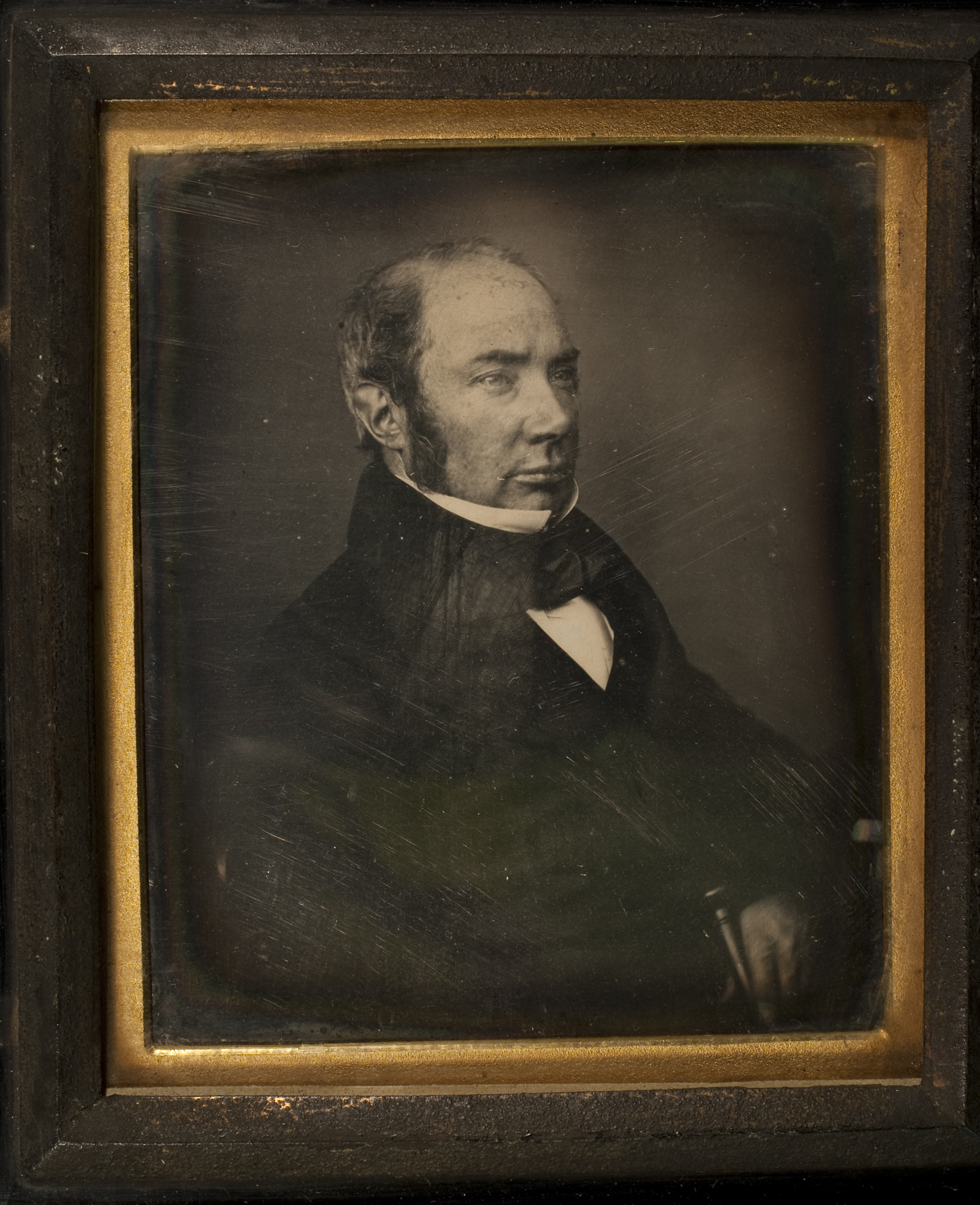
- Portrait of William Ick (Birmingham Museums, accession number 1964F109)
- Born: 1800; Newport, Shropshire, United Kingdom
- Died: 23 September 1844 (aged 43–44)
- Occupations: Botanist, geologist

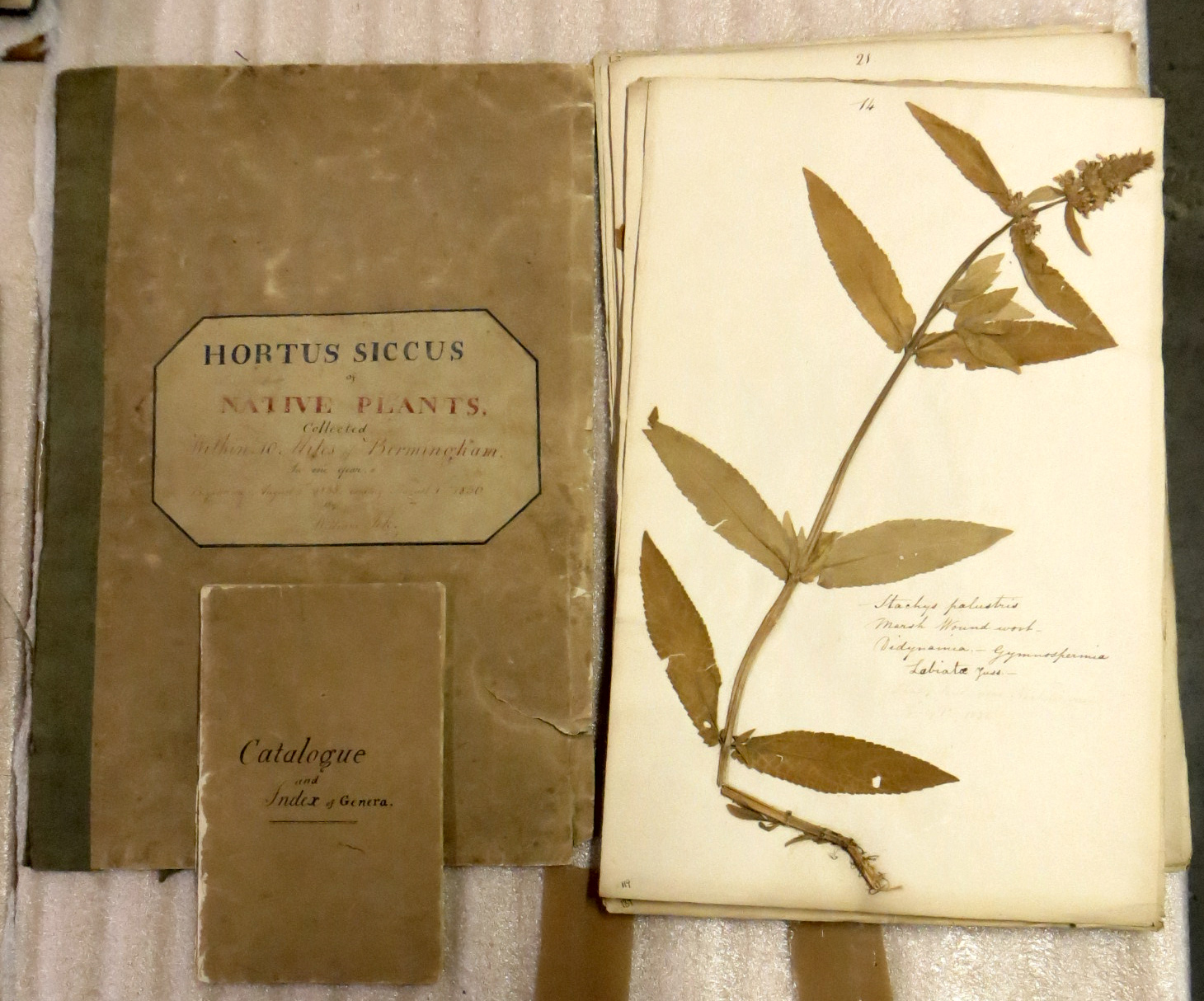
The frontispiece, catalogue and one herbarium sheet from Ick's herbarium, held in Birmingham Museums

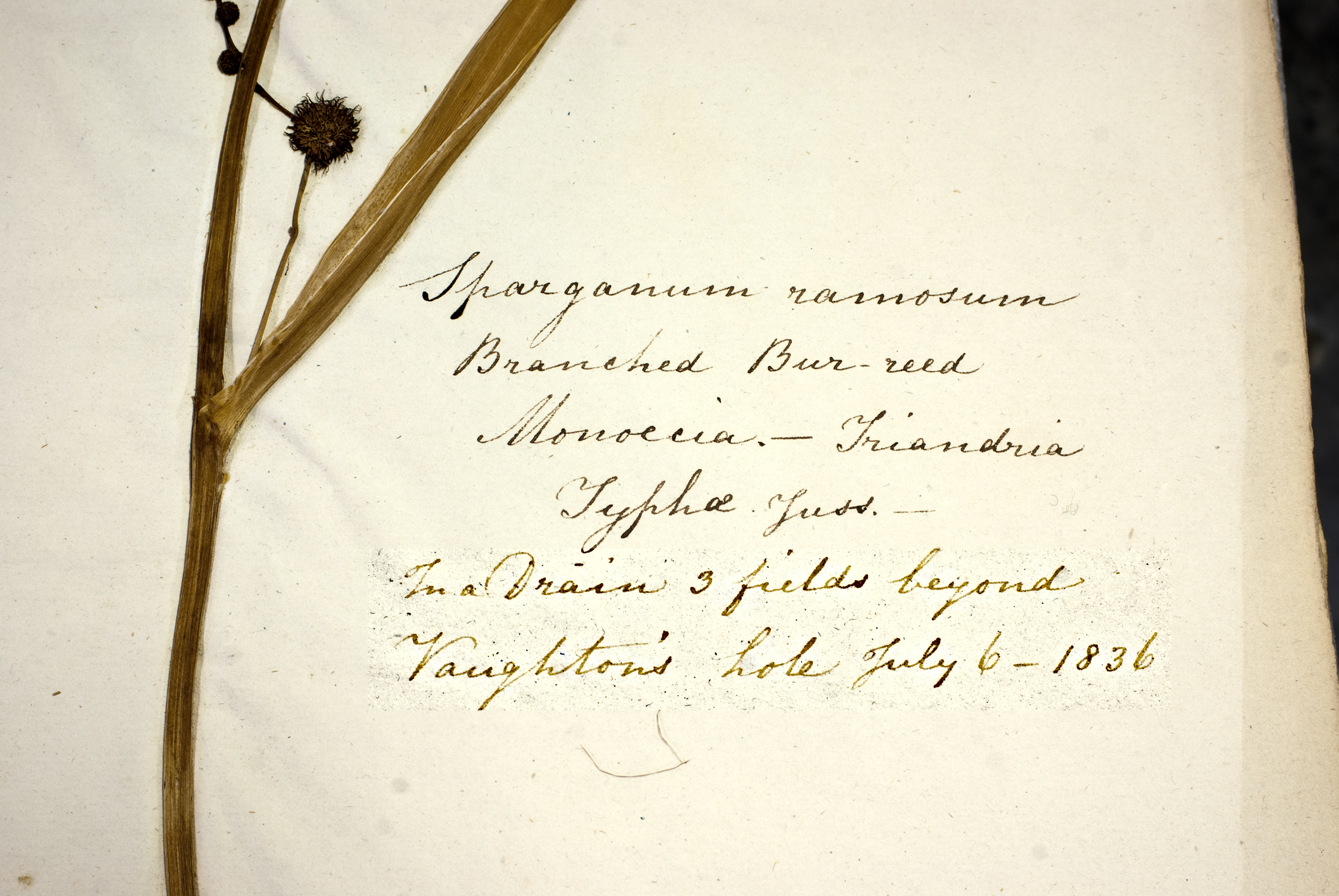
Sample of Ick's handwriting on a herbarium sheet in Birmingham Museums

William Ick (1800 – 23 September 1844) was an English botanist and geologist. In 1837 he won a prize offered by the United Committee of the Birmingham Botanical and Warwickshire Floral Societies for the best herbarium, known as a hortus siccus, of native plants collected within 10 miles (16 km) of Birmingham within a one-year period from 1 August 1836.

== Early life ==
Ick was born at Newport in Shropshire in 1800. In 1803 his family moved to Birmingham. His father was a dealer in skins and hides.

== Education ==
He was awarded a Ph.D. in Geology from a German university.

== Career ==
Ick was a tutor at a school near Warwick before becoming the first curator of the Birmingham Philosophical Institution.

== Contribution to botany ==
In 1835 the United Committee of the Birmingham Botanical and Warwickshire Floral Societies offered a prize for the best herbarium of native plants collected within a 10 miles radius of central Birmingham between 1 August 1836 and 1 August 1837. Ick won this prize with a herbarium of around 320 pressed plants and published his findings. In 1948 Ick's herbarium was presented to Birmingham Museum and Art Gallery after being lost for over a century
