= Bingley Hall =

First purpose-built exhibition hall in Great Britain

Coordinates: 52°28′44.40″N 1°54′38.84″W

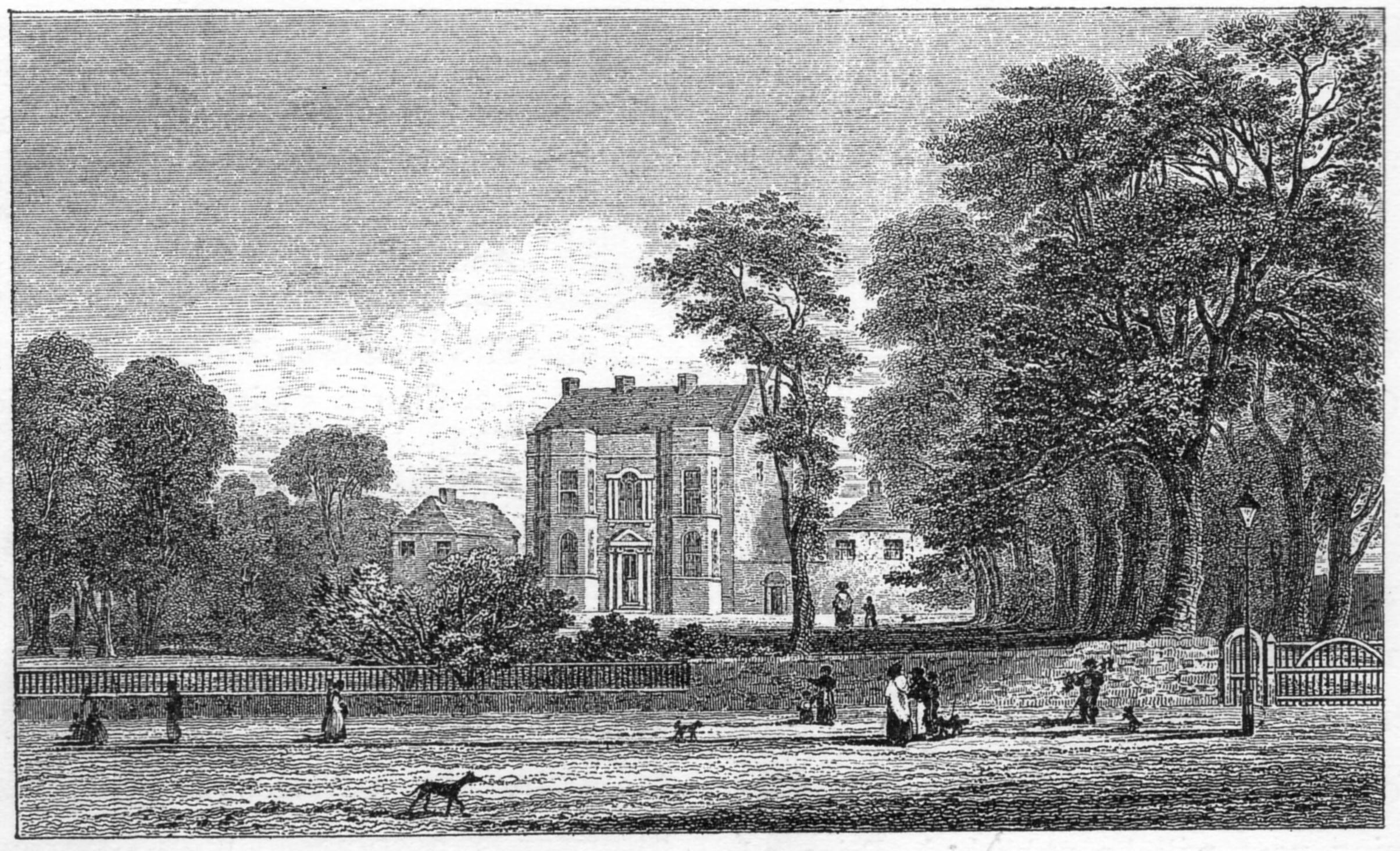
Bingley House 1830, demolished to build Bingley Hall in 1850

Bingley Hall in Birmingham was the first purpose-built exhibition hall in Great Britain. It was built in 1850 and burned down in 1984. The International Convention Centre now stands on the site.

== Precursor ==
The precursor of Bingley Hall was an "Exhibition of the Manufactures of Birmingham and the Midland Counties" in a temporary wooden hall built in the grounds of, and attached to, Bingley House on Broad Street in central Birmingham (once the home of banker Charles Lloyd, and visited by Samuel Taylor Coleridge) and opened on 3 September 1849 for visitors to the Birmingham Triennial Music Festival. This exhibition was visited by Charles Darwin, and also on 12 November by Prince Albert and may have contributed to his ideas for the Great Exhibition of 1851 at the Crystal Palace.

== History ==
Bingley House was built about 1760 as Byngas Hall, but was shown on local maps as Bynges Hall as early as 1553, and was the home of James Farmer, whose daughter Mary married Charles Lloyd. The house and its land were bought by a railway company in order to build the railway tunnel (New Street North Tunnel) for the Birmingham, Wolverhampton and Stour Valley Railway. The house was demolished.

In December 1849, the first Birmingham annual cattle show and poultry show were held in a temporary hall on the corner of Lower Essex Street and Kent Street, but the following year the second shows were held in the new Bingley Hall.

Bingley Hall was built by Messrs Branson and Gwyther (architect J. A. Chatwin), for £6,000 in six weeks in 1850, using steel columns surplus to the construction of Euston railway station. It was built in the Roman Doric style using red and blue bricks (the Staffordshire blue bricks being diverted from building the Oxford Street viaduct). Covering one and a quarter acres internally, it measured 224 feet (68 m) by 221 feet (67 m), used 11,700 feet (3,600 m) of 21-inch (530 mm) glass, and had ten entrance doors.

During its life, it was used as a venue for the Birmingham Dog Show, cattle shows, chrysanthemum shows, circus, boxing, cinema, and in its later days for popular music concerts. It had a cycle track used for competitions. It was used as a huge meeting space. Gladstone held a political meeting in November 1888, following Joseph Chamberlain's split from the Liberal Party over Irish Home Rule, and spoke for two hours. The speech was recorded by the journal Political World on an Edison phonograph shipped from New York – the first political speech recorded. Chamberlain himself spoke there before an audience of some 10,000 people in November 1903, during his campaign for fiscal reform. On 17 September 1909, Charlotte Marsh and Mary Leigh climbed onto the roof of Bingley Hall. They were protesting at women being excluded from a political meeting where the British Prime Minister Asquith was giving a speech. Marsh and Leigh threw roof tiles at the police. They went to trial and were sent onto Winson Green Prison.

In the early months after it was raised in 1859, the Birmingham Rifles (later the 1st Volunteer Battalion of the Royal Warwickshire Regiment) paraded at Beardsworth's Horse Repository, but as numbers grew it moved at the invitation of the Cattle Show committee to Bingley Hall. This arrangement was never satisfactory, because the battalion could not use the hall for the duration of the cattle show in November and December each year. When the show committee also let the hall to a circus for three months in the spring of 1879, the battalion was temporarily housed in Mr Wiley's factory in Graham Street. The battalion then acquired a site of its own and built a drill hall at Thorp Street.

The hall was used repeatedly for meetings and conversions by various non-conformist religions, including the Elim Pentecostal Church in 1930, led by George Jeffreys.

== Fire ==
The hall was damaged by fire at the Midland Caravan, Camping and Leisure Exhibition in January 1984 and subsequently demolished, its functionality having been replaced by the National Exhibition Centre (NEC) just outside the city in Solihull. The International Convention Centre stands in its place.
