= A. Follett Osler =

Abraham Follett Osler
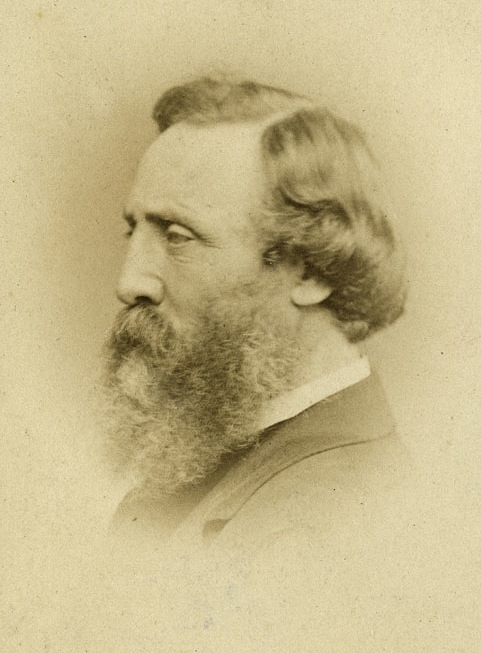
- Born: 22 March 1808; London, England
- Died: 26 April 1903 (aged 95)
- Occupation: Meteorologist
- Title: Senior Researcher

Abraham Follett Osler (22 March 1808 – 26 April 1903), known as A. Follett Osler, was a pioneer in the measurement of meteorological and chronological data in Birmingham, England.

== Early life ==
He attended Hazelwood School on Hagley Road, Birmingham (1816–1824) owned at that time by Thomas Wright Hill. In 1831, he became the manager of his father's glass manufacturing firm on Broad Street. He made many gifts of money and equipment to the BPI and BMI.

== Career ==
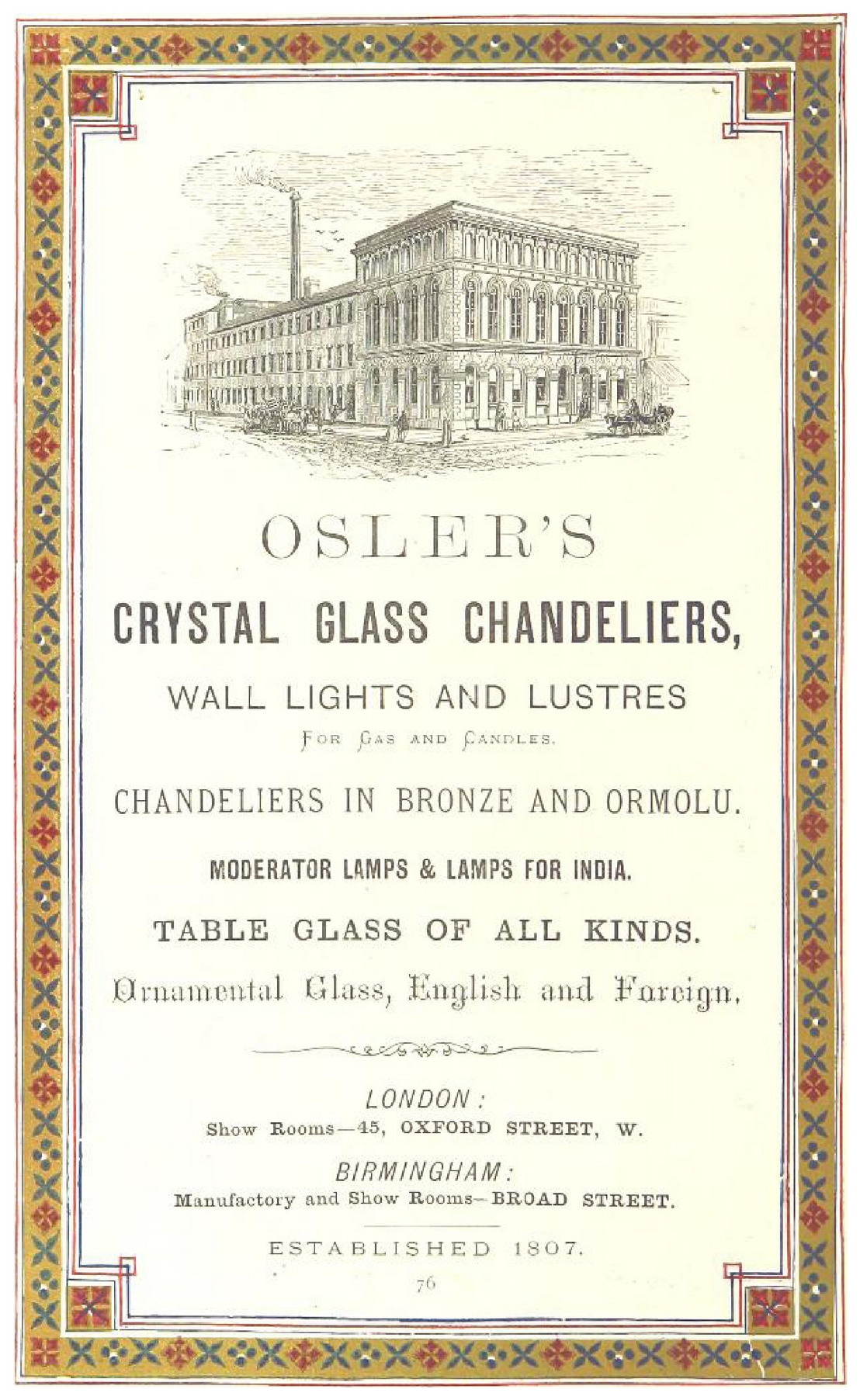
Advertisement for Osler's products

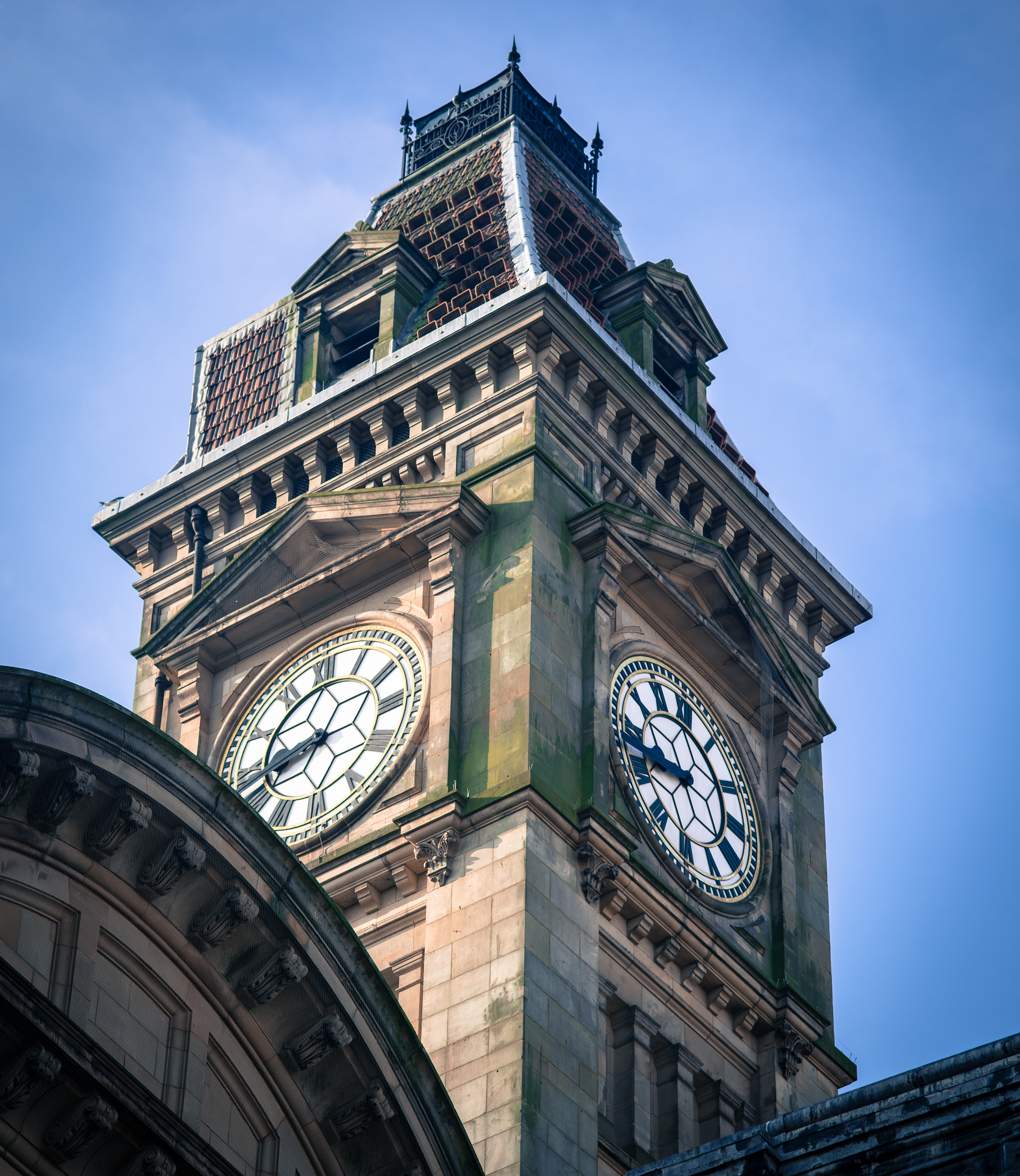
Follett Osler funded the clock tower at Birmingham Museum & Art Gallery

He was a member of the Birmingham Philosophical Institution (BPI) (Honorary Secretary of the Junior Department in 1841) and its successor the Birmingham and Midland Institute (BMI).

In 1835 he developed the first self-recording pressure-plate anemometer and rain-gauge, and installed it at the BPI's premises in Cannon Street, Birmingham. The self-recording anemometer measured the varying wind pressure on a spring-mounted plate of known area, kept at right angles to the direction of the wind by means of a vane, and recorded the reading via a pencil on a moving sheet of paper. The wind direction determined by the position of the vane was also recorded. Rain was collected in a funnel and flowed into a vessel supported on a counterbalanced lever whose movement could also be recorded. When the vessel was full it discharged its contents automatically and the pencil returned to the zero line. The benefits of the device were so appreciated that similar devices were installed at several other sites, including Greenwich observatory. Osler used the data collected to help understand the nature and origins of winds.

Shortly after giving lectures on chronology in 1842 he provided an accurate display of local time based on astronomical measurements on a public clock in front of the Philosophical Institution in Cannon Street from which the church clocks were set. It was eventually synchronised to Greenwich Mean Time by electrical telegraph when the railway timetable became important. Later a number of clocks around Birmingham were linked by wire. The clock was transferred to the BMI when the BPI closed down in 1852. The Crystal Fountain which was the centrepiece of the Great Exhibition of 1851 was his creation and in 1854 he produced a 2-tier, 20-feet-high candelabrum for the Exhibition of Industrial Arts and Manufacturers. In 1883, he gave a clock and bells for the tower of the new Art Gallery, which was constructed in 1885. This clock, nicknamed Big Brum, subsequently acted as the town's timepiece, replacing the expensive network of clocks wired around the town.

He was elected a Fellow of the Royal Society in 1855.

== Death and commemoration ==
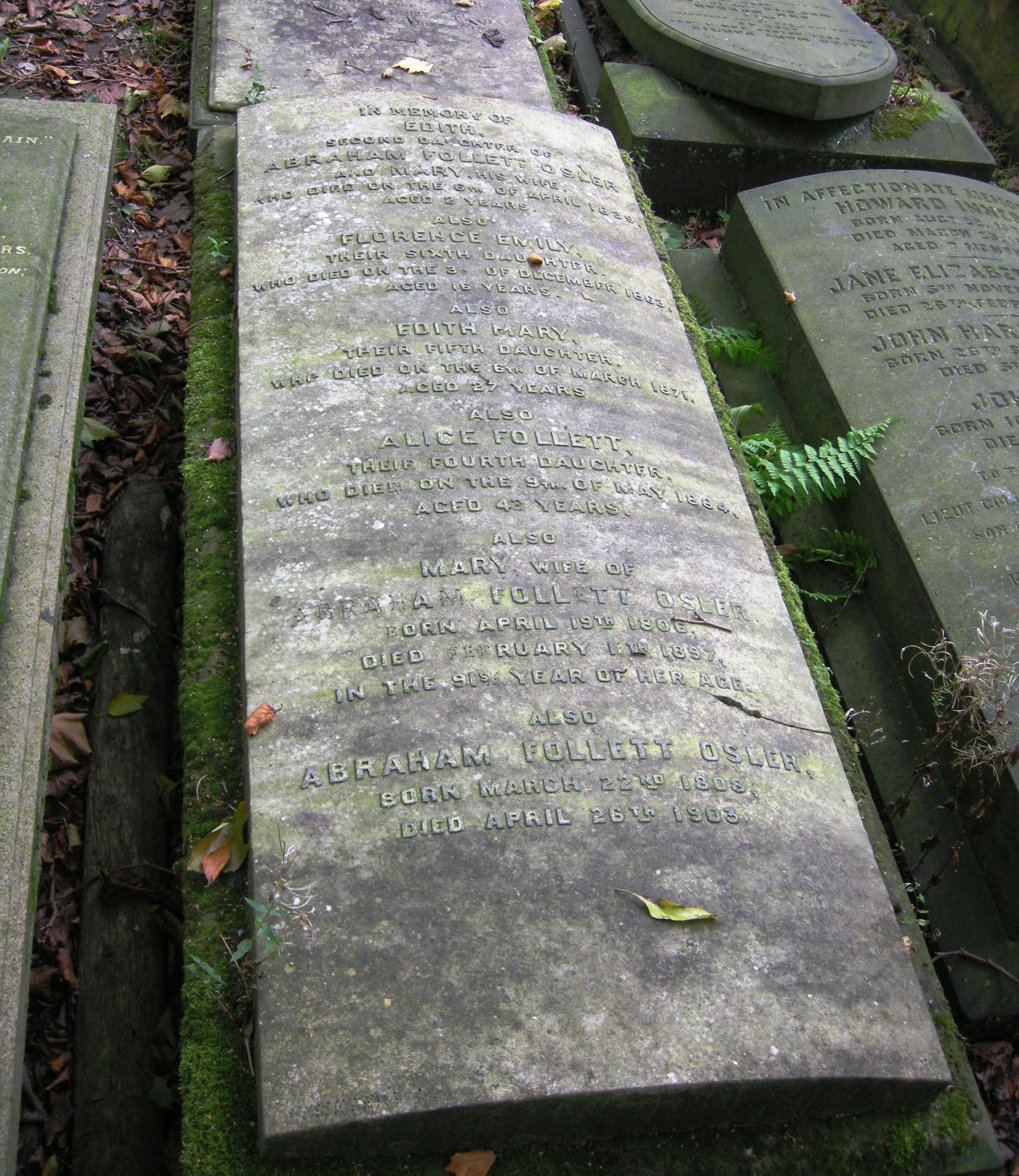
Grave of A. Follett Osler, his wife Mary, and four of their daughters, in Key Hill Cemetery, Hockley

Osler died aged 95 on 26 April 1903, and was buried in Key Hill Cemetery, Hockley. He had married in 1832 Mary, daughter of Thomas Clark, a Birmingham merchant and manufacturer, and had eight children, of whom only three survived him.

His son, Henry Follett Osler (d. 1913), carried on his meteorological work at the BMI and gave money for the lease by the BMI of Perrott's Folly, a 100-foot monument in Edgbaston, for use as an observatory. A daughter, Fanny Follett Osler, married the chemist William James Russell.

Osler Street and Osler Street School, Ladywood, were named in his honour.

== See also ==
- Birmingham and Midland Institute – meteorological measurements
