= Edgbaston =

Area in the city of Birmingham, England

Coordinates: 52.4580°N 1.9190°W

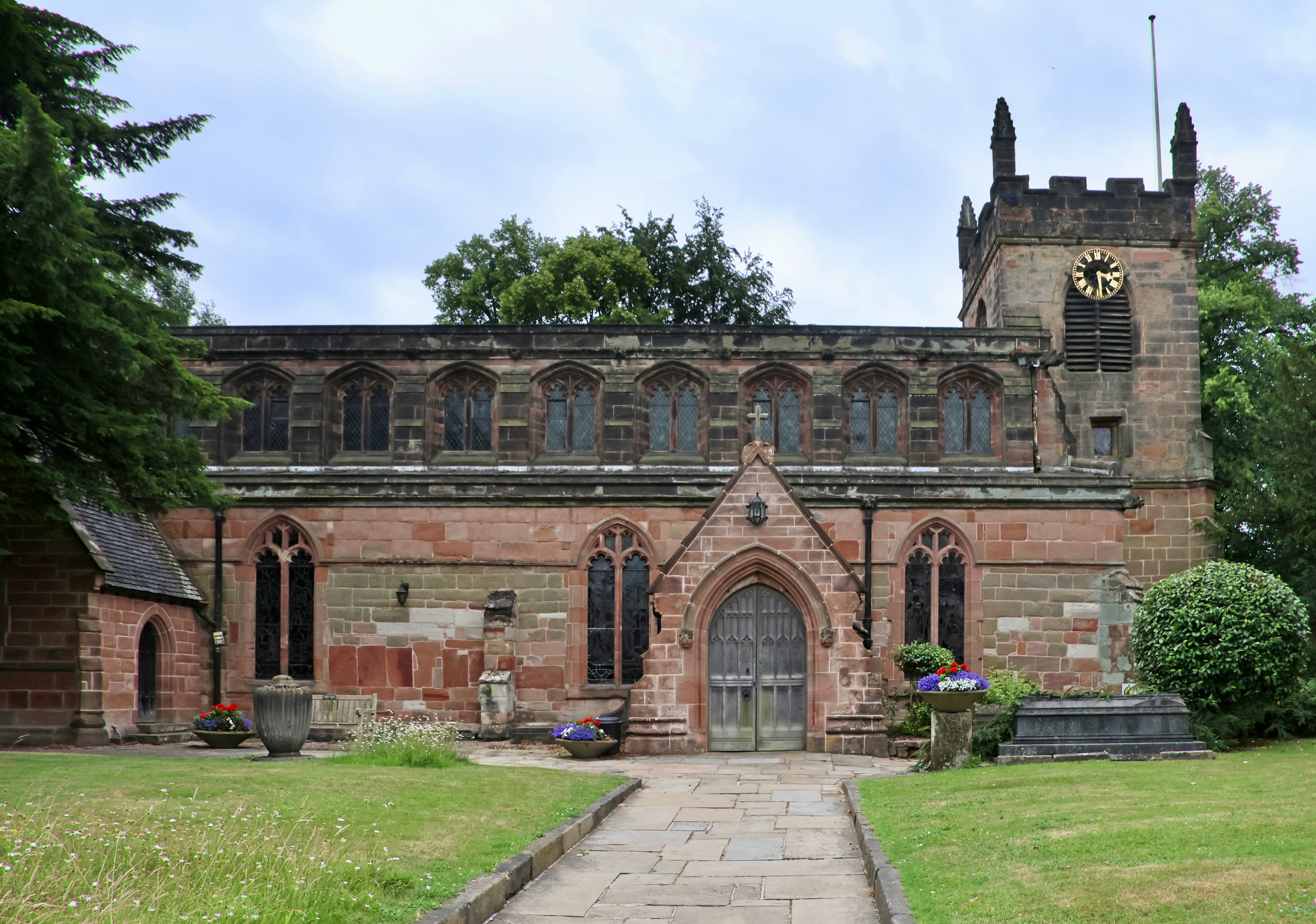
- St Bartholomew's Church

- Location within the West Midlands
- Population: 42,295 (2021 census)
- OS grid reference: SP055845
- Metropolitan borough: Birmingham
- Metropolitan county: West Midlands
- Region: West Midlands
- Country: England
- Sovereign state: United Kingdom
- Post town: Birmingham
- Postcode district: B15, B16, B5
- Dialling code: 0121
- Police: West Midlands
- Fire: West Midlands
- Ambulance: West Midlands
- UK Parliament: Birmingham Edgbaston

Edgbaston (/ˈɛdʒbəstən/) is a suburb of Birmingham, West Midlands, England. It lies immediately south-west of Birmingham city centre, and was historically in Warwickshire. The wards of Edgbaston and North Edgbaston had a combined population of 42,295 at the 2021 census.

Edgbaston is the location of Edgbaston Cricket Ground, the University of Birmingham, Birmingham Botanical Gardens, the Midlands Arts Centre and the Edgbaston Archery and Lawn Tennis Society, the oldest lawn tennis club in the world.

== Etymology ==
Edgbaston means "village of a man called Ecgbald", from the Old English personal name + tun "farm". The personal name Ecgbald means "bold sword" (literally "bold edge"). The name was recorded as a village known as Celboldistane in the hundred of Coleshill in the 1086 Domesday Book.

== History ==
In the 19th century, the area was under the control of the Gough-Calthorpe family and the Gillott family, who refused to allow factories or warehouses to be built in Edgbaston, making it attractive for the wealthier residents of the city. It then came to be known as "where the trees begin". One of these private houses is grade one listed and open to the public.

== Demography ==
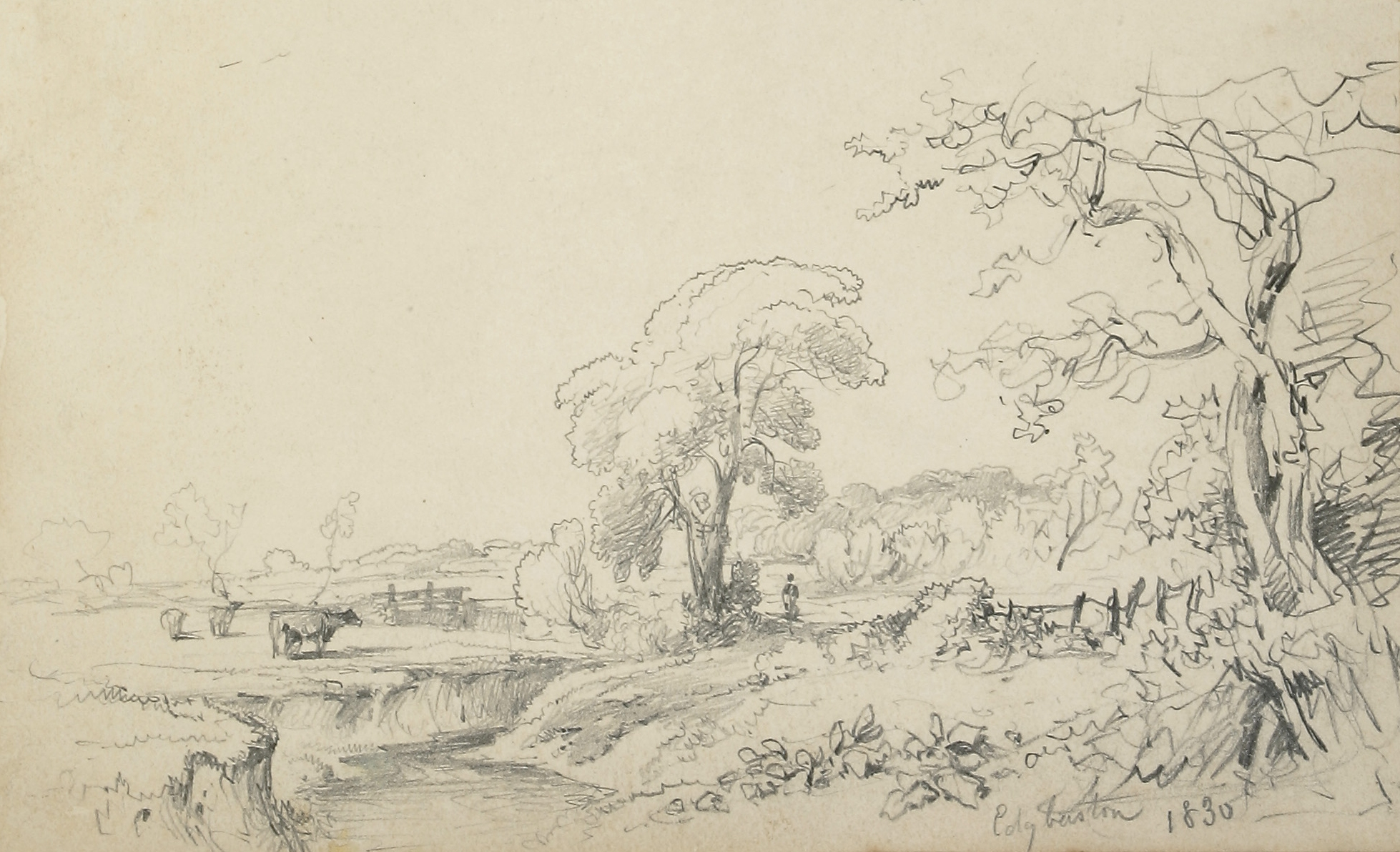
Cattle graze in Edgbaston in 1830

In 1801, Edgbaston had a population of around 1,000 people. By 1841, this had increased to 16,500 as a result of wealthy manufacturers moving to the area. By 1850, 29 roads had been laid out and uninterrupted growth continued.

The 2001 census found that 20,749 people were living in the Birmingham City Council ward of Edgbaston, in 8,666 households. This produced an average of 2.4 people per household, slightly below the citywide average of 2.5. The ward, which has an area of 871.6 hectares (2,154 acres), had a population density of 23.8 people per hectare. Like the city of Birmingham, Edgbaston had a slightly higher proportion of females, at 50.1%, to males. 27.1% of the population was in the 25–44 age bracket and 15.1% were aged between 45 and 59. At 14.8%, Edgbaston had a lower proportion of people of a pensionable age than the rest of Birmingham (16.7%). It also had a lower proportion of people of working age at 73.8%, although it was above the national percentage of 61.5%.

Edgbaston has a slightly above average percentage for ethnic minorities with ethnic minorities representing 31.8% of the population as opposed to 29.6% for Birmingham. The largest ethnic minority group was the British Asian group at 16.1%. 25.6% of people were born outside of the United Kingdom, above the Birmingham figure of 16.5%. Christianity was the predominant religion, with 52.5% of the population stating that they were Christians, compared with 59.1% for Birmingham. 8.0% stated that they were Muslims, below the Birmingham figure of 14.3%. Edgbaston was home to a significant Orthodox Jewish community. 19.1% of the Edgbaston population stated that they had no religion.

46.4% of households were owner-occupied, below the Birmingham figure of 60.4%. 19.3% were rented privately, 15.2% were rented from a housing association and 11.6% were rented from Birmingham City Council. There was a total number of 9,191 houses in Edgbaston, 525 of which were vacant. At 45.6%, the largest proportion of houses in Edgbaston were purpose-built blocks of flats. This is much higher than the city average of 17.9%. Detached houses were the second most common housing type in the ward at 19.7%.

Edgbaston had an unemployment rate of 8.1%, below the city average of 9.5% although above the national average of 5%. 13.4% of the population stated themselves as students. Of the unemployed, 42% were in long term unemployment and 15.6% had never worked. At 24.6%, the majority of the population worked in finance, real estate, and business activities. The largest employer in the area was the Heart of Birmingham Primary Care Trust, employing 10,000 people.

The Edgbaston parliamentary constituency has a much higher population.

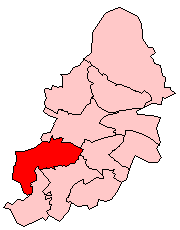
Edgbaston constituency shown within Birmingham

== Governance ==
Edgbaston forms two wards within the metropolitan district of Birmingham, Edgbaston and North Edgbaston, which each elects two councillors to Birmingham City Council. Edgbaston is also a 'council constituency', managed by its own district committee. The suburb is split into two wards (Edgbaston ward and Edgbaston North) on Birmingham City Council. There are two councillors in each. As of 2026, Edgbaston is represented by two Conservative councillors and North Edgbaston is represented by two Labour councillors. Of the other wards of the Edgbaston constituency, Bartley Green is represented by two Conservative councillors, Harborne by two Labour councillors, and Quinton by two Labour councillors.

The parliamentary constituency of Birmingham Edgbaston comprises the two wards and the wards of Bartley Green, Harborne and Quinton. Its member of Parliament (MP) is Labour's Preet Kaur Gill. The constituency has returned a female member to Parliament since 1953. Previous MPs included prime minister Neville Chamberlain, who was born in Edgbaston.

In 1911 the civil parish had a population of 26,398. On 1 April 1912 the parish was abolished and merged with Birmingham.

== Sport ==
Warwickshire County Cricket Club is based at the 25,000 capacity Edgbaston Cricket Ground, the area historically being part of Warwickshire. As well as hosting regular county matches, the ground plays host to the England cricket team during one day internationals and test matches.

The area also has a world class tennis venue, the Edgbaston Priory Club. The Birmingham Classic for female players has been held there every year since 1982 and some of the world's top players participate. The tournament is part of the WTA Tour and wins count towards world rankings. The oldest lawn tennis club in the world, the Edgbaston Archery and Lawn Tennis Society, founded in 1860 is nearby.

There is also a members-only golf course, which offers views over the southern part of the suburb. Edgbaston Croquet Club has been located in the area since 1915.

== Places of interest ==
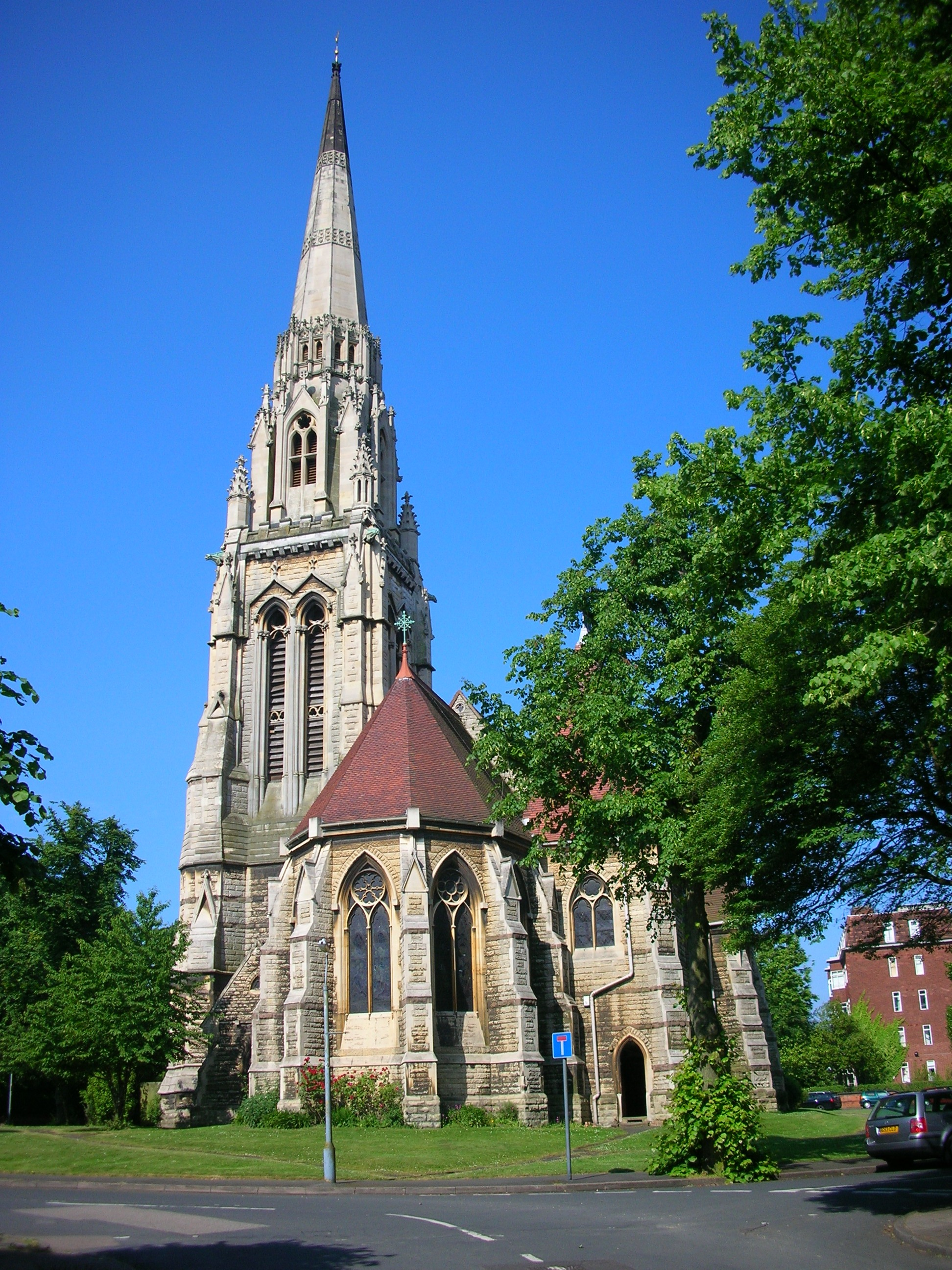
St Augustine's Church

The Church of England parish churches are St Augustine's Church, SS Mary and Ambrose, St Germain's Church, St George's Church and St Bartholomew's Church, also known as Edgbaston Old Church. Birmingham Central Synagogue built in 1961 is also in Edgbaston. The Roman Catholic church of the Birmingham Oratory, on Hagley Road, was built in 1907 in the Baroque style as a memorial to John Henry Newman, who founded the English Oratory here. Its dome is a prominent landmark.

The writer and academic J. R. R. Tolkien lived in Edgbaston during his teenage years, and the two towers of Edgbaston, Perrott's Folly and the Waterworks Tower, both close to the Oratory, are said to have provided inspiration for The Two Towers, part of his The Lord of the Rings trilogy. The Barber Institute of Fine Arts, which is located on the University of Birmingham campus, is a purpose-built gallery which contains a wide range of art from the Old Masters to Picasso.

Edgbaston Reservoir, formerly known as Rotton Park Reservoir, provides a header supply for the Birmingham Canal Navigations and is an important inner city leisure amenity. There are three public gardens located within Edgbaston; the Birmingham Botanical Gardens and the lesser known University of Birmingham Winterbourne Botanic Garden and Martineau Gardens. Adjoining the university gardens is Edgbaston Pool (not to be confused with the reservoir) which is a Site of Special Scientific Interest. Deer's Leap Wood is a site of local importance for nature conservation in the former Mitchells & Butlers (brewery) land in the north part of Edgbaston. Edgbaston contains the only grade I listed domestic building in Birmingham, an Arts & Crafts house at 21 Yateley Road, designed by Herbert Tudor Buckland, and built for his own use. Edgbaston Hall, a grade II listed country hall, is located within the ward. It is currently the clubhouse for Edgbaston Golf Club.

The BBC opened its Pebble Mill Studios at Pebble Mill in 1971, which were in use for 33 years until their closure in October 2004 and demolition the following year. The site is now the location of the new Birmingham Dental Hospital.

== Education ==
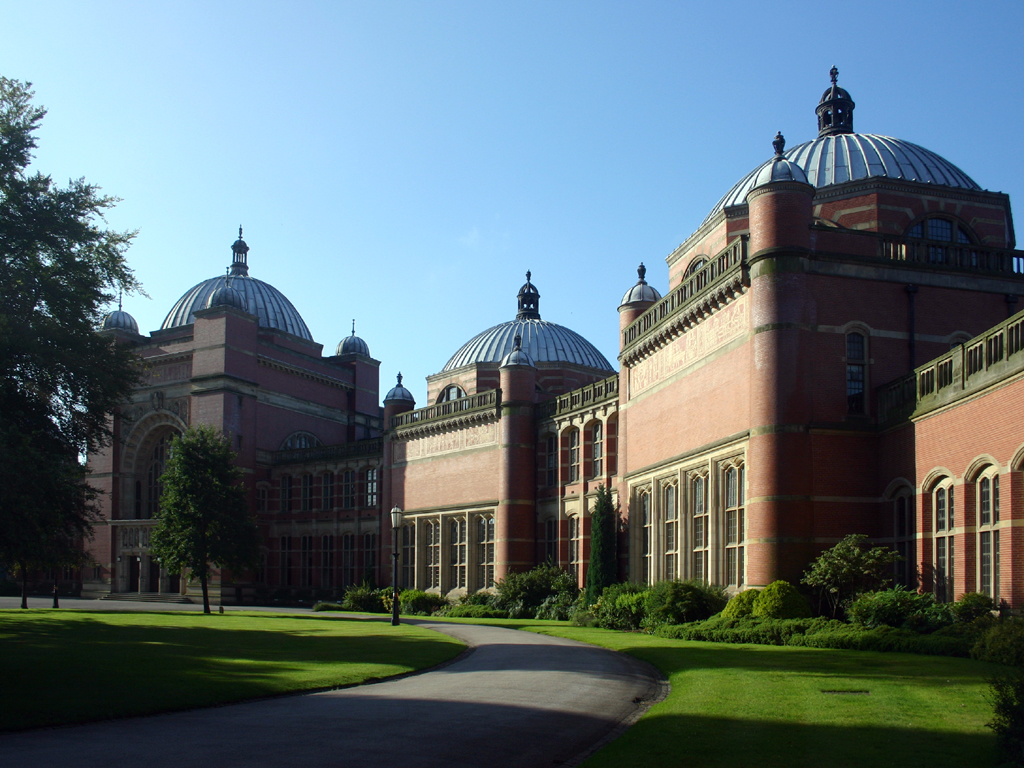
Chancellor's Court, University of Birmingham

Since the beginning of the 20th century, Edgbaston has been home to Edgbaston High School for Girls, St Paul's School for Girls, St George's School, King Edward's School, King Edward VI Five Ways School, King Edward VI High School for Girls and Priory School.

Two universities have campuses in Edgbaston, the University of Birmingham and Birmingham City University; there are numerous university halls of residence in the area. The Joseph Chamberlain Memorial Clock Tower, one of Birmingham's tallest buildings, can be found at the centre of the University of Birmingham.

In addition, the area is also home to a number of independent preparatory schools, namely West House School, Norfolk House School and Hallfield School, along with primary intakes at Edgbaston High School for Girls, Priory School and St George's School.

Edgbaston is also the home of Queen's College, an ecumenical theological college. Independent primary schools Birmingham Blue Coat School and Hallfield School are also located in the area. The Elmhurst School for Dance, the oldest vocational dance school in the United Kingdom, relocated to a new building in Edgbaston in 2004. St Philip's Grammar School used to be located adjacent to the Oratory. However, it became a sixth form college in 1976 and then merged with South Birmingham College in 1995.

== Transport and amenities ==
Two railway stations serve the area. The first, University station, is found in south Edgbaston, west of University of Birmingham. The second is Five Ways railway station in the north of the ward on the city's Middle Ring Road. Both stations are on the Cross-City Line. Between these two stations used to be another, Somerset Road station; however, this was closed and demolished in 1930.

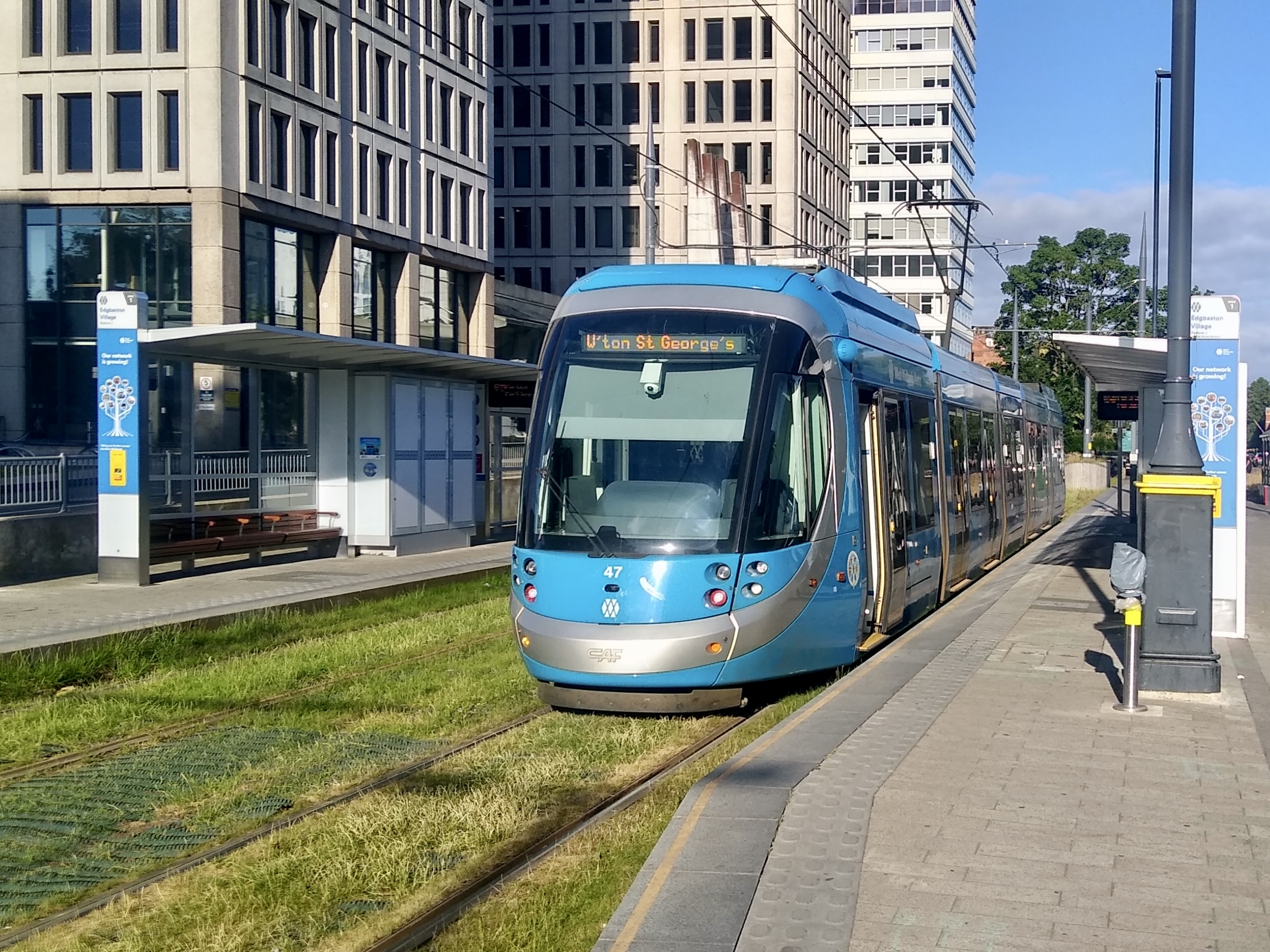
Edgbaston Village tram stop

Edgbaston Village tram stop opened as the terminus of the West Midlands Metro in July 2022.

The A38 Bristol Road runs through the ward and is one of the main traffic arteries of the city reaching out to the south-west of the city and beyond from the city centre and New Street. Buses frequently stop along this route. There are several other bus routes throughout. The Worcester & Birmingham Canal passes through the area, connecting the city centre with the River Severn at Worcester. This was constructed and opened in the 1790s and is now used mainly for leisure and recreational purposes as opposed to its original industrial usage.

The A456 Hagley Road runs through the north of Edgbaston and gives a relatively swift link with the city centre as well as further away places including Halesowen, Kidderminster and Hereford.

The nearest public libraries to the area are in Harborne, Selly Oak and Balsall Heath, whilst the University of Birmingham main library (which members of the public can join for a fee) is in the area. There are a number of medical facilities in the area, with some of the most well known being the University Medical Centre and the Calthorpe Clinic. A large hospital, the Queen Elizabeth Hospital, is located within the area, with the former Selly Oak Hospital site nearby.

== Notable residents ==
Here is a list of notable residents, many of whom have had blue plaques erected on their former houses by The Birmingham Civic Society:

- Annette Badland, actress.
- Sir Gilbert Barling, surgeon, lived at Blythe Court, Norfolk Road and moved to 6 Manor Road after the death of his wife.
- Rosslyn Bruce, priest and naturalist, lived at 4 Manor Road between 1912 and 1923.
- Herbert Tudor Buckland. Arts and Crafts architect, lived at 21 Yateley Road; it is open to the public.
- Kate Bunce a famous Pre-Raphaelite painter 1856–1927.
- Barbara Cartland (1901–2000), one of the best-selling authors worldwide of the 20th century, was born at 31 Augustus Road.
- Sir Austen Chamberlain, Foreign Secretary and Nobel Peace Prize laureate, lived at 83 Harborne Road.
- Neville Chamberlain, British Prime Minister, was born in a house called Southborne, in Edgbaston, and later became the area's MP.
- Oscar Deutsch, founder of Odeon cinemas, lived at 8 Rotton Park Road.
- George Harry DeVall, architect, lived at 152 Rotton Park Road 1901–1934.
- Bernard Docker, industrialist.
- Charles Geach MP, founder of the Midland Bank, lived in Wheeleys Hill (now Wheeleys Road).
- William Haywood, architect, lived at 245 Bristol Road (house now demolished).
- Sir Rowland Hill, the postal reformer, lived at 146 Hagley Road (house now demolished).
- Sir John Jaffray, founder of the Birmingham Daily Post and Birmingham Mail, lived at 249 Bristol Road.
- Major Arthur Keen (1895–1918), World War I flying ace, awarded Military Cross, lived in Edgbaston until his military service.
- Celia Levetus (1874–1936), illustrator.
- Sir Oliver Lodge, physicist, lived at Westbourne Road (house now demolished).
- Pink Floyd drummer Nick Mason was born in Edgbaston.
- Tony Miles, England's first chess grandmaster, was born in Edgbaston.
- Constance Naden, poet and philosopher, lived most of her life at Pakenham House, Edgbaston.
- Mary Neal social worker, suffragette and collector of folk dances, was born in Edgbaston.
- Cardinal John Henry Newman lived at the Birmingham Oratory, Hagley Road.
- Eugene W. Oates, ornithologist.
- Catherine Osler, suffragette, lived at 'Fairfield' on the corner of Hagley Road & Norfolk Road.
- John Henry Poynting, physicist, lived at 11 St Augustine's Road.
- Bertha Ryland (1882–1977), militant suffragette.
- Joseph Henry Shorthouse, Victorian novelist, lived at 60 Wellington Road, Edgbaston.
- Field Marshal William Slim, 1st Viscount Slim lived in Poplar Avenue.
- Joseph Sturge, abolitionist, lived at Wheeleys Road (house now demolished).
- J. R. R. Tolkien lived here for a period during his younger life, living for a time in Stirling Road, with Perrott's Folly and the Edgbaston Waterworks supposedly providing him with the inspiration behind The Two Towers.
- Julie Walters, actress, was born at the former St Chad's Hospital.
- Dr William Withering, physician, lived at Edgbaston Hall.
- John Wyndham, the science fiction author, was brought up here and lived at 239 Hagley Road (now demolished) until 1911 when his parents divorced.
- Francis Brett Young, novelist, lived at 105 Harborne Road.
