= Perrott's Folly =

1758 tower in Birmingham, England

Coordinates: 52.4744°N 1.9312°W

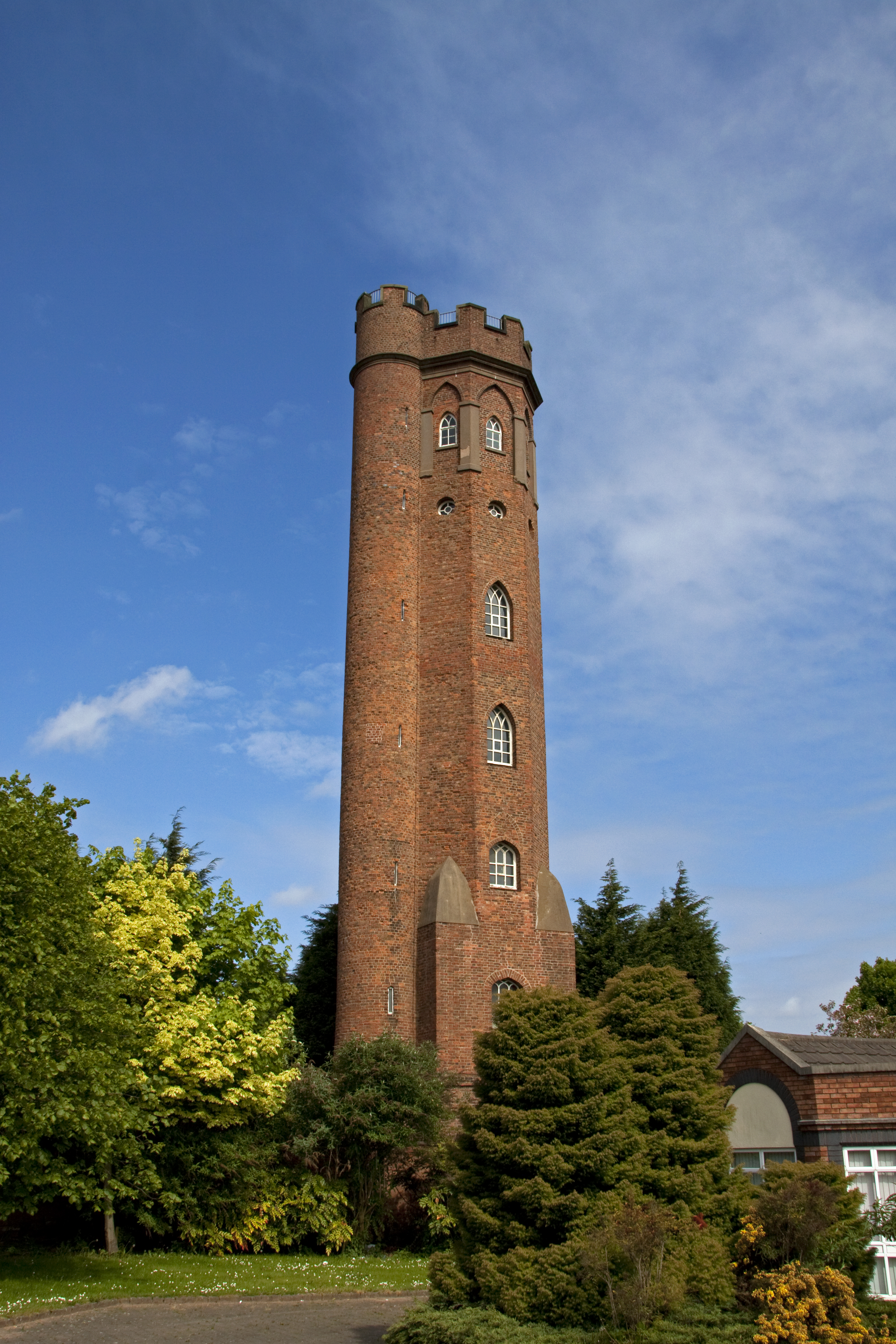
Perrott's Folly

Perrott's Folly, grid reference SP047862, also known as The Monument, or The Observatory, is a 29-metre (96-foot) tall tower, built in 1758. It is a Grade II* listed building in the Edgbaston area of Birmingham, United Kingdom.

== History ==
Built in the open Rotton Park by John Perrott in 1758, who lived in Belbroughton, the tower now stands high above the local residential and business housing.

There are many stories to explain why the tower was built: that John Perrott wanted to be able to survey his land and perhaps entertain guests; or to spot animals for hunting; or so that he could see his wife's grave, 15 miles (24 km) away.

From 1884 to 1979 the tower was used as a weather recording station for the Birmingham and Midland Institute. In 1966 the Geography Department of the University of Birmingham took over the running of the observatory until operations were transferred to the main campus.

It has been suggested, but not proven, that the towers of Perrott's Folly and Edgbaston Waterworks may have influenced references to towers in the writings of J. R. R. Tolkien, who lived nearby as a child.

== Prospects ==
The Perrott's Folly Company was formed in 1984 to renovate the tower and make it accessible to the public. The company obtained grants from English Heritage and Birmingham City Council to secure the building.

In the summer of 2005 the Perrott's Folly Company, in partnership with Birmingham Conservation Trust, completed work to stabilise the structure. However, money still has to be found to complete repairs to some of the key features. In April 2008 the tower was temporarily opened to the public, housing an art exhibition in co-operation with the Ikon Gallery. It was opened again in May 2008 as part of a weekend of celebrations of the life of J. R. R. Tolkien. The Perrott's Folly Company was formally closed in August 2009. The tower was managed by Trident Housing Association between 2005 and 2017 and is now managed by Re.Future Collective, a Birmingham based Arts and Architecture Collective.

== Sources ==
- A Guide to the Buildings of Birmingham, Peter Leather, ISBN 0-7524-2475-0
- Historic England. "The Monument (Observatory) (1076123)". National Heritage List for England.
- Heritage at Risk Register: Perrott's+Folly
