= Edgbaston Waterworks =

Pumping station in Birmingham, West Midlands, England

Coordinates: 52.4758°N 1.9336°W

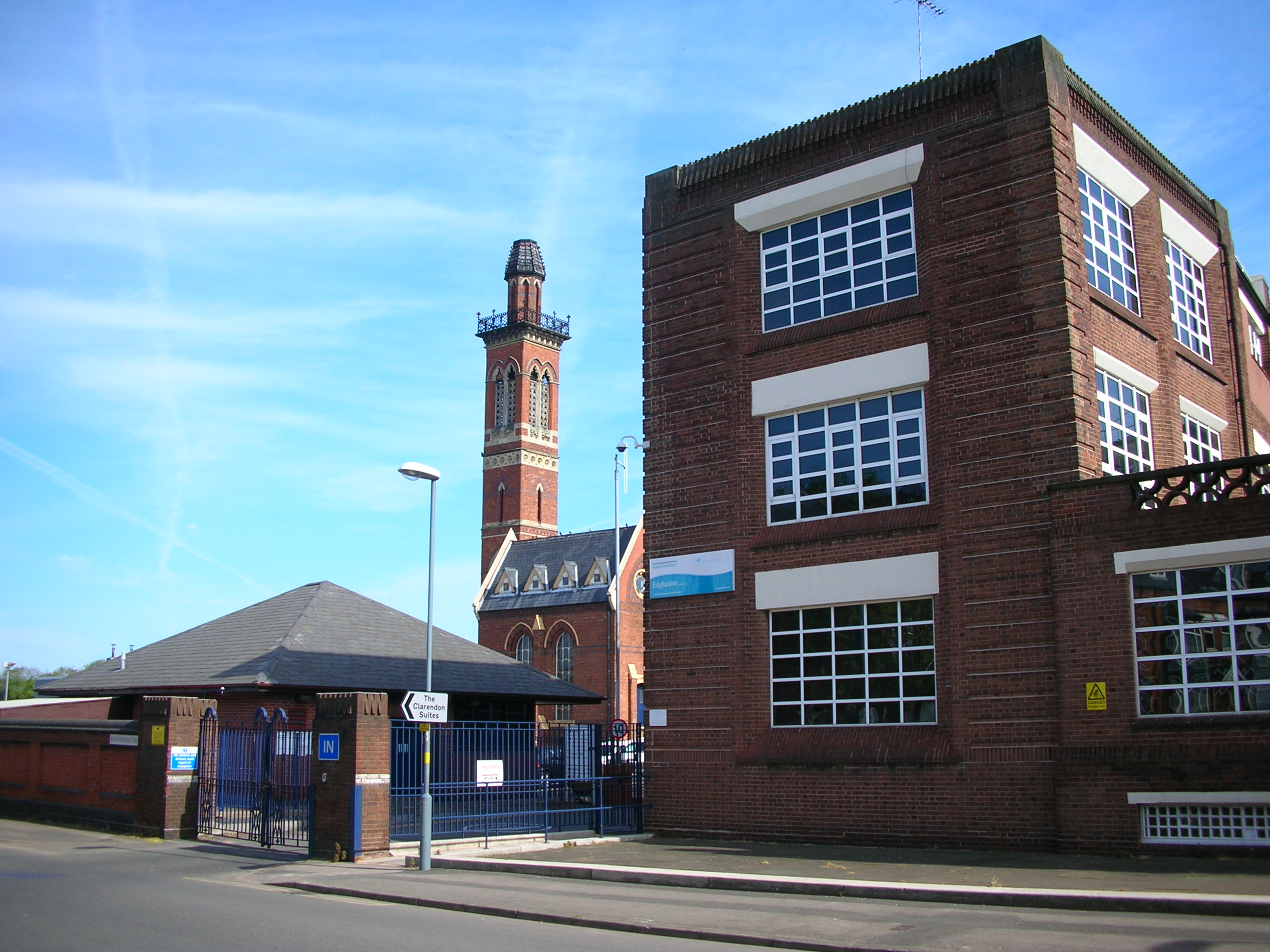
Edgbaston Waterworks

Edgbaston Waterworks (Edgbaston Pumping Station) (grid reference SP0455386465) lies to the east of Edgbaston Reservoir, two miles west of the centre of Birmingham, England.

The buildings were designed by John Henry Chamberlain and William Martin around 1870. The engine house, boiler house, and chimney are Grade II listed buildings. The site is operated by Severn Trent Water. Despite the close proximity to Edgbaston Reservoir there is no current or historical connection of the water. This waterworks manages domestic water supply whereas the reservoir was built to feed the canal system.

It has been suggested, but not proven, that the towers of Perrott's Folly and Edgbaston Waterworks may have influenced references to towers in the writings of J. R. R. Tolkien, who lived nearby as a child.

== See also ==
- Birmingham Corporation Water Department
- Perrott's Folly

== Sources ==
- A Guide to the Buildings of Birmingham, Peter Leather, ISBN 0-7524-2475-0
