= Violet Holden =

English artist and book illustrator (1873-?)

- Born: Violet Mary Holden; 28 December 1873; Moseley, Worcestershire
- Died: 3 October 1958 (aged 84); Redhill, Surrey
- Education: Birmingham School of Art
- Relatives: Edith Holden (sister); Evelyn Holden (sister)

Violet Mary Holden (12 December 1873 — 3 October 1958) was an English artist and book illustrator. Throughout her career, most of her illustrations were done in collaboration with her sister Evelyn. She additionally worked in stained glass design and metalwork, and specialized in illuminated lettering.

== Early life and education ==
Holden was born in Birmingham in 1873 to Emma Wearing Holden and Arthur Holden, an industrialist. Her sisters were Edith Holden (1871-1920), Effie M. Holden (b. 1867), and Evelyn Holden (1877-c. 1969). In 1890, she and her Evelyn began to attend the Birmingham Art School, joining their sister Edith who already studied there. Their family then moved to a house named Gowan Bank, which was closer to the railway that went to Birmingham. In 1893, she was awarded a local scholarship for the Birmingham School of Art, based on her success in "personal examinations" that were held in the United Kingdom.

== Career ==
Holden illustrated various publications. She was one of 18 contributors to Quest, an illustrated magazine published by the Birmingham Guild of Handicraft from 1894 to 1896. She contributed to the Book of Pictured Carols, created by the Birmingham School of Art. She illustrated the 1894 book The Real Princess with her sister, Eveyln. The book was a "fairy story" written by Blanche Atkinson. She and Eveyln also illustrated the 1895 book The House that Jack Built & Other Nursery Rhymes, which was edited by Grace Rhys.

One of her pieces—a late-1890s silver and enamel casket, designed by Holden and Florence Camm—is part of the permanent collection at the Birmingham Museum and Art Gallery. The casket was made for John Thackray Bunce.

In 1904, Holden began to teach at Birmingham Art School, where she previously attended.
