= Highgate, Birmingham =

Area of Birmingham, England

Coordinates: 52.4686°N 1.8870°W

Highgate
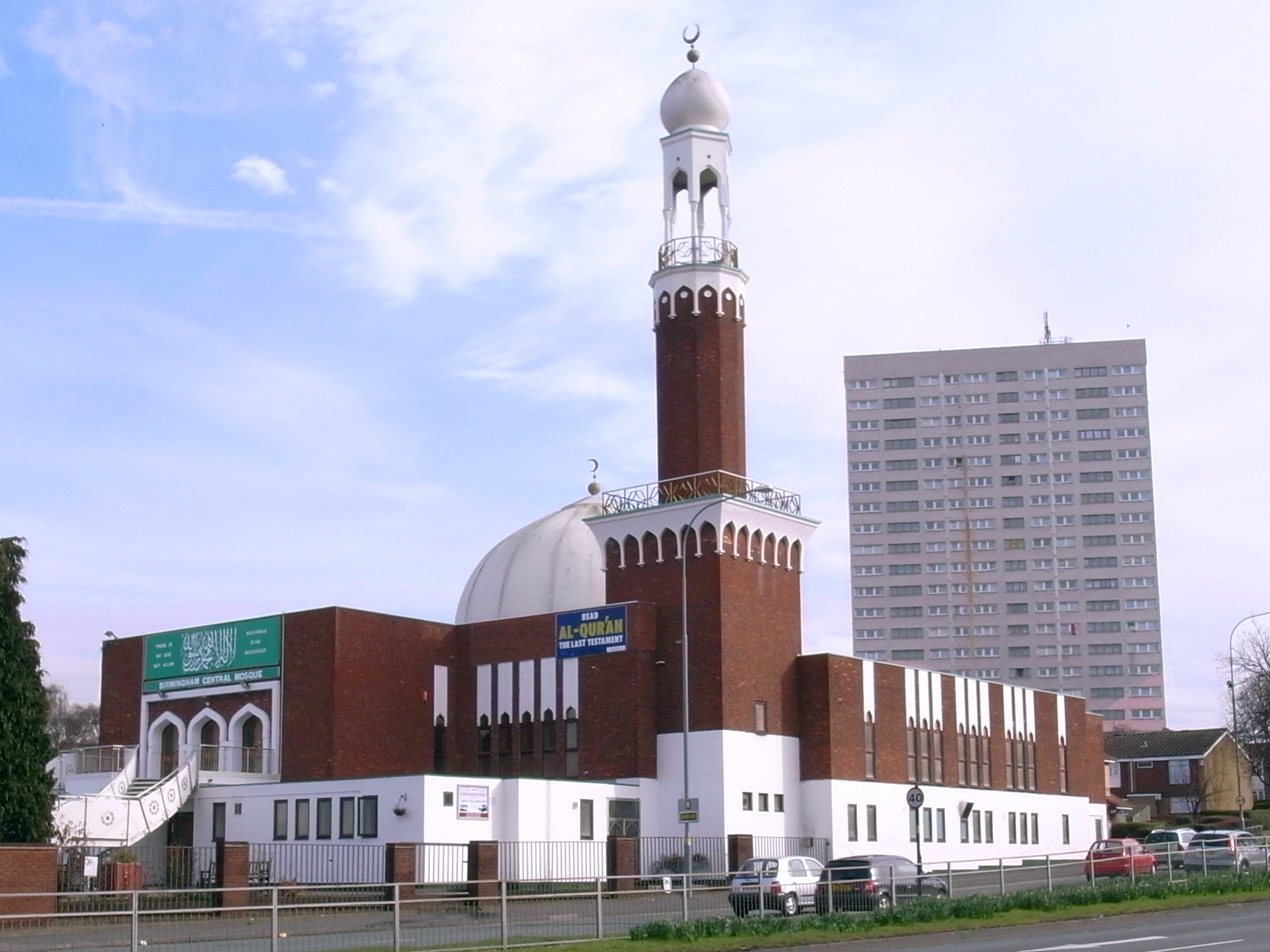
- Birmingham Central Mosque

- Location within the West Midlands
- OS grid reference: SP0767585676
- Metropolitan borough: Birmingham
- Metropolitan county: West Midlands
- Region: West Midlands
- Country: England
- Sovereign state: United Kingdom
- Post town: BIRMINGHAM
- Postcode district: B12
- Dialling code: 0121
- Police: West Midlands
- Fire: West Midlands
- Ambulance: West Midlands
- UK Parliament: Birmingham Ladywood

Highgate is an area of Birmingham, England. Following the Big City Plan of February 2008, Highgate has become a district of Birmingham City Centre. The area is regarded as the site of the original Anglo-Saxon settlement which gave the city of Birmingham its name.

Birmingham Central Mosque is one of Highgate's most distinctive buildings. The area mainly consists of commercial premises and modern council-owned residential properties. Older buildings include Stratford House, the Church of St Alban the Martyr and large Victorian houses opposite Highgate Park.

Highgate is also home to Joseph Chamberlain Sixth Form College, the Camp Hill line and the Friends' Institute buildings

Local amenities include an array of small shops, around Gooch Street.

Nearby areas include Lee Bank, Balsall Heath, Edgbaston and Sparkbrook.

== History ==
Most of the area that came to be known as Highgate was built after 1850 and by 1900 had a population of about 15,000. The local community is now very mixed due to successive waves of immigration, primarily from the Commonwealth.

The area had a large Bangladeshi population prior to its redevelopment in the 1970s. Many were from the rural area of Sylhet and had arrived in the late 1950s and early 1960s. They settled in the area because its property, being of a very poor standard, was cheap. However, in 1971, a survey for the Race Relations Institute found that few of them wanted to move. One account of the time says:

Because of the overcrowding, my uncle and Abdul Jabbar bought the next door house. Soon the situation returned with a population of twenty or so in the two houses. Admittedly our houses were not always up to standard. We were all men, all working in heavy industry and all working overtime. When we came home we were already tired but had to do our cooking and cleaning. It was still "Home, Sweet Home" to us.

Highgate was one of five areas surrounding Birmingham city centre earmarked in the 1950s for comprehensive redevelopment as "new towns"; the others were Newtown, Lee Bank, Ladywood and Nechells Green.

== Geography ==
Elevation

Western parts of Highgate are on the River Rea plain at about 109 metres (358 ft) above sea level. The land rises to the east, reaching 135 metres (443 ft) at the Highgate Middleway south of Leopold Street.

== Transport ==
Highgate Middleway (A4540) links Camp Hill Circus and Haden Circus. Until 1851 there was a toll gate across Stratford Road, known as the Balsall Heath Gate. It was owned by the Alcester Turnpike Trust which had been founded in 1767 to maintain the road.

Some of Highgate's streets were named after the local Vaughton family. Dymoke Street was named after Mary Ann Dymoke, wife of Robert Vaughton. Emily Street was named after their daughter-in-law.

Vaughton Street was built in the 1860s, nearly 1600 people lived there by 1881. It originally consisted of back-to-back houses, with outside toilets and water taps. In 1938 the Council demolished these houses and built St Martin's Flats. They were built using concrete because it was cheap, however it made them inherently damp. The flats quickly deteriorated and they were eventually knocked down in 1980. Private houses were built on the site in 1987.

Stanhope Street was called Ryland Street up to 1881. Louisa Ryland was a member of one of the wealthiest families of Birmingham, and owned a lot of land in Birmingham, including parts of Highgate.

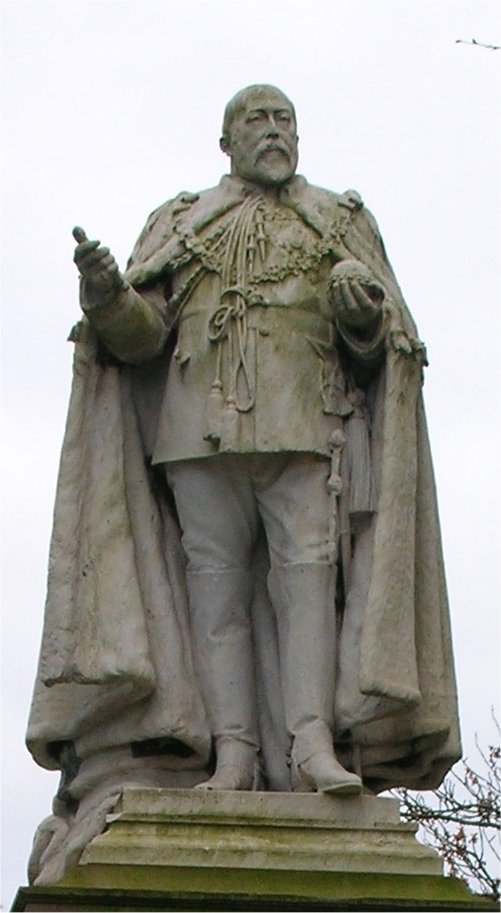
Edward VII Memorial at Highgate Park

== Highgate Park ==
Highgate Park stands on land that was originally owned by Elizabeth Hollier, who used it for grazing. When Elizabeth died her will stated that the land was to be used for charitable purposes. The four fields were to be rented out, and twelve poor people of Aston Parish and twelve poor people of Birmingham Parish were to be clothed with the money each year. In 1875, the Trustees of Elizabeth Hollier's Charity wanted to develop the land for industry. The pasture had fine views over the town and Birmingham Corporation bought the land and laid out lawns, ornamental flower beds and shrubs for a public park. Mayor of Birmingham, Joseph Chamberlain formally declared the park open on 2 June 1876. A bronze fountain was relocated to the park from the Market Hall in 1880. The part of the park near Alcester Street was later asphalted to serve as a playground. Highgate Park was home to Birmingham's King Edward VII Memorial from 1951 until its relocation to Centenary Square in 2010.

== Listed buildings ==
Alongside Highgate Park is the red brick facade of the Rowton House Hotel. It was built in 1903–4 as a Rowton House hostel for single working men and was converted to a hotel in the 1990s. Listed as Parkview House, the building features octagonal corner towers topped with copper-sheafed conical roofs; terracota figures of dragons holding shields are set around the top floor. The Alcester Street entrance porch is terracota-faced and has spandrels featuring relief figures of boys representing industry and rural poverty or farming. A similar figure tops the central finial.

On Moseley Street, next to the Rowton House Hotel is a former police barracks built circa 1880, in use as a hostel.

Stratford House, is a Grade II* listed building dating from 1601, near to Camp Hill traffic island.

Samuel Heath & Sons began as a brass founder and have been based at the Cobden Works on Leopold Street since the business was established in 1820. The office building dates from 1888 and has been listed for architectural and historical interest.

Next to St Alban's Church on Conybere Street are Lench's Trust almshouses and warden's house built in 1879 and designed by J A Chatwin.

== Schools in the area ==
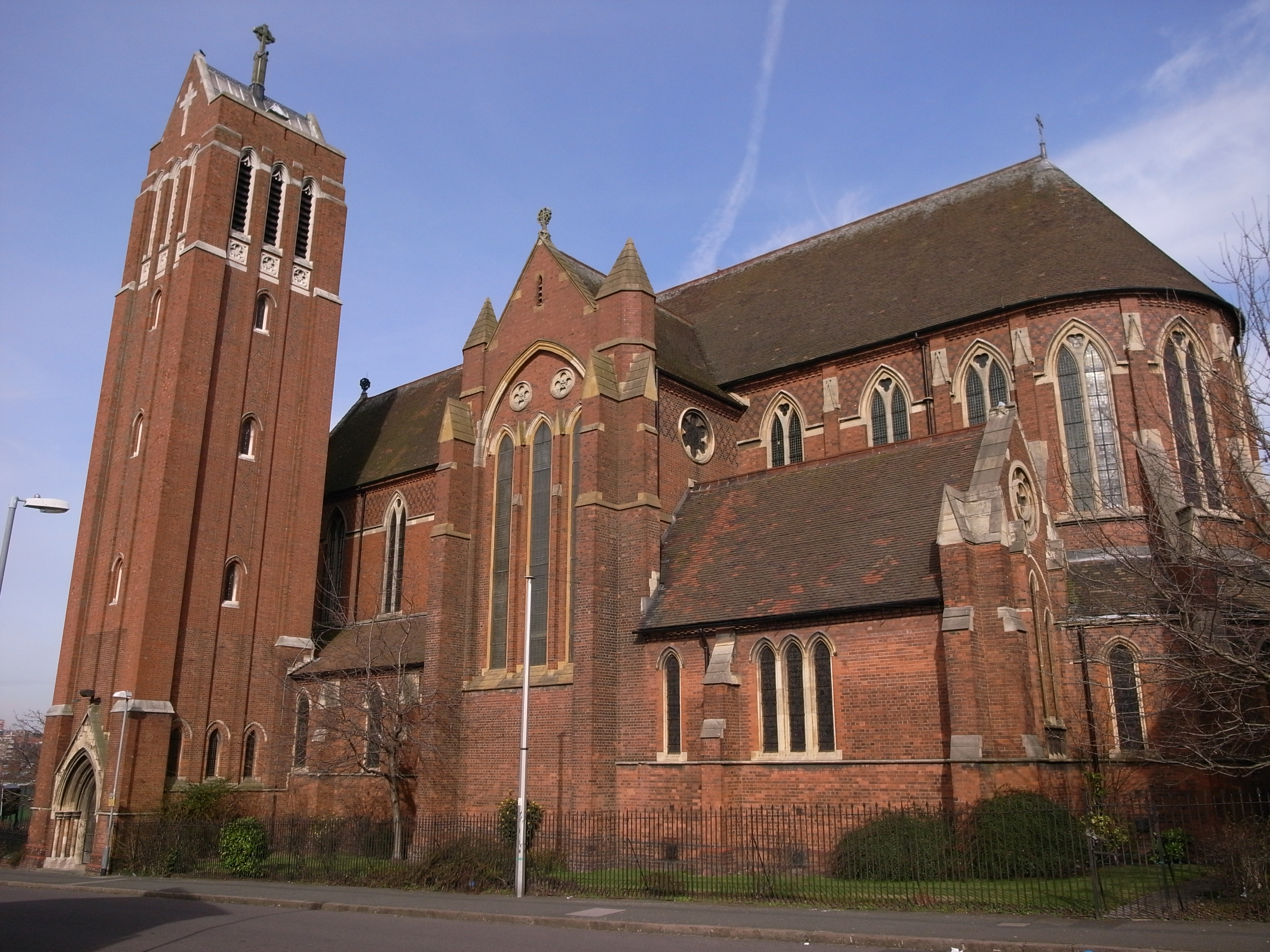
Church of St Alban and St Patrick

- Ark St Alban's Academy
- Calthorpe Special School
- Chandos Primary School
- Percy Shurmer Academy
- St Anne's Primary School

=== St Alban’s Church and School ===
James Samuel Pollock and his brother Thomas Benson Pollock were Anglo-Catholics who built a combined church and school in Leopold Street, in 1865. The original church building was used as a boys' school after it was replaced by the existing St Alban the Martyr Church in 1881. A girls' school was also set up in Dymoke Street.

== Notable people from Highgate ==
- Edward White Benson, an Archbishop of Canterbury
- William Mosedale, George Cross recipient
