= Birmingham Gazette =

British newspaper

The Birmingham Gazette of 20 October 1922

The Birmingham Gazette, known for much of its existence as Aris's Birmingham Gazette, was a newspaper that was published and circulated in Birmingham, England, from the eighteenth to the twentieth centuries. Founded as a weekly publication in 1741, it moved to daily production in 1862, and was absorbed by the Birmingham Post in 1956.

The newspaper's title was initially Birmingham Gazette and General Correspondent from 1741; Aris's Birmingham Gazette by 1743, and continuing until 1862; Birmingham Daily Gazette from 1862 to 1904; Birmingham Gazette & Express from 1904 to 1912; and Birmingham Gazette from 1912 to 1956. In November 1956 the Birmingham Gazette was absorbed by the Birmingham Post. The merger led to the publication of The Birmingham Post & Birmingham Gazette which ran until 1964.

== History ==
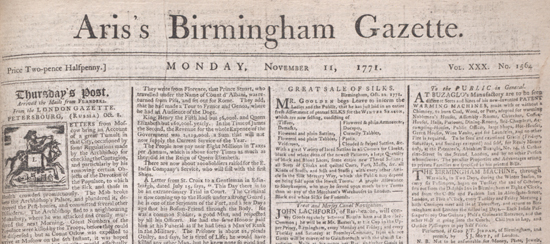
Front page masthead, 11 November 1771 edition

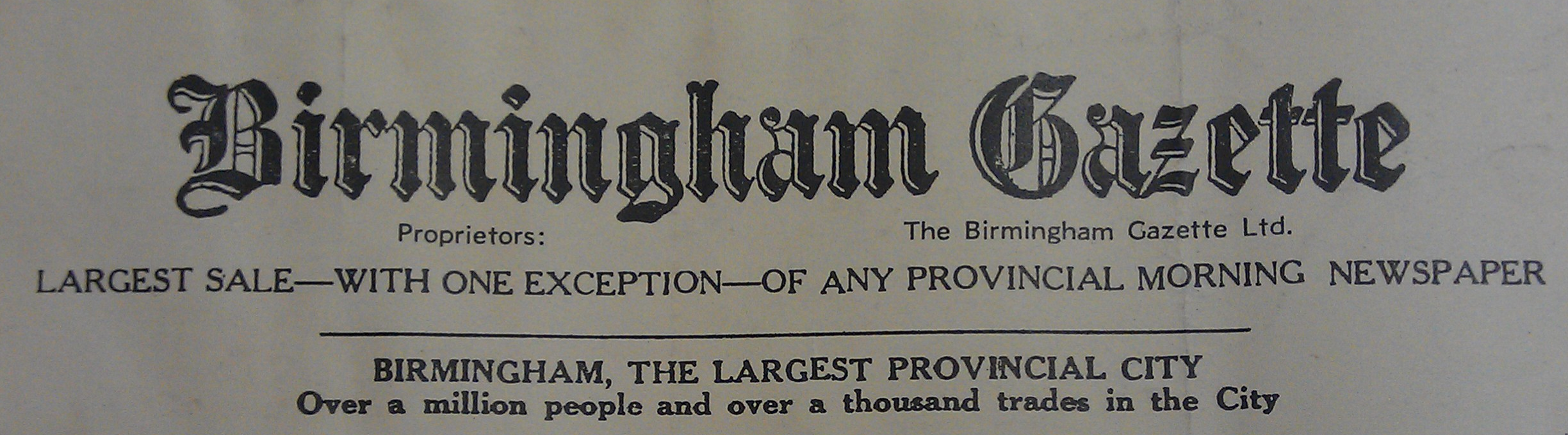
Letterhead, from correspondence dated 5 October 1937

The Gazette was founded as the Birmingham Gazette and General Correspondent by Thomas Aris, a stationer from London who had moved to Birmingham in May 1740 and started a bookselling and printing business in the High Street. The first edition was issued on 16 November 1741, just under ten years after the town's first known newspaper, the Birmingham Journal. By 1743 it had absorbed its rival Warwick and Staffordshire Gazette – which had been founded in London in 1737 and moved to Birmingham in 1741 – and become the town's only newspaper.

Although decried by its rivals as a "Mere register of sales or... broker's guide" due to its high number of advertisements, Asa Briggs described the eighteenth century Gazette as "one of the most lucrative and important provincial papers, ranking with the Liverpool Mercury and the Edinburgh Courant".

Historical copies of the Gazette, dating back to 1741, are available to search and view in digitised form at the British Newspaper Archive.

== Editors ==
- John Thackray Bunce (1860–1862)
