= Ark St Alban's Academy =

Location
- Conybere Street; Highgate; Birmingham, West Midlands, B12 0YH; England
- Coordinates: 52.46673°N 1.89023°W

Information
- Type: Academy
- Religious affiliation: Church of England
- Local authority: Birmingham
- Department for Education URN: 135970 Tables
- Ofsted: Reports
- Gender: Mixed
- Age: 11 to 18
- Website: http://arkstalbans.org/

Ark St Alban's Academy is a mixed secondary school and sixth form located in the Highgate area of Birmingham, West Midlands, England.

Previously administered by Birmingham City Council, the school converted to academy status on 1 September 2009. Ark St Alban's Academy is sponsored by Ark and the Church of England Diocese of Birmingham. The school also maintains links with the Parish of St Alban the Martyr, Birmingham.

Ark St Alban's Academy offers GCSEs and Cambridge Nationals as programmes of study for pupils, while students in the sixth form (which opened in 2013) have the option to study from a range of A-levels. The school also has specialisms in mathematics and engineering.

== History ==
The original school was founded in 1871 by brothers, James and Thomas Pollock, Christian missionaries in the Anglo-Catholic tradition from the Isle of Man. The new school opened in 2009.
