= Stratford House, Birmingham =

Building in Birmingham, England

Coordinates: 52.4678293°N 1.881027°W

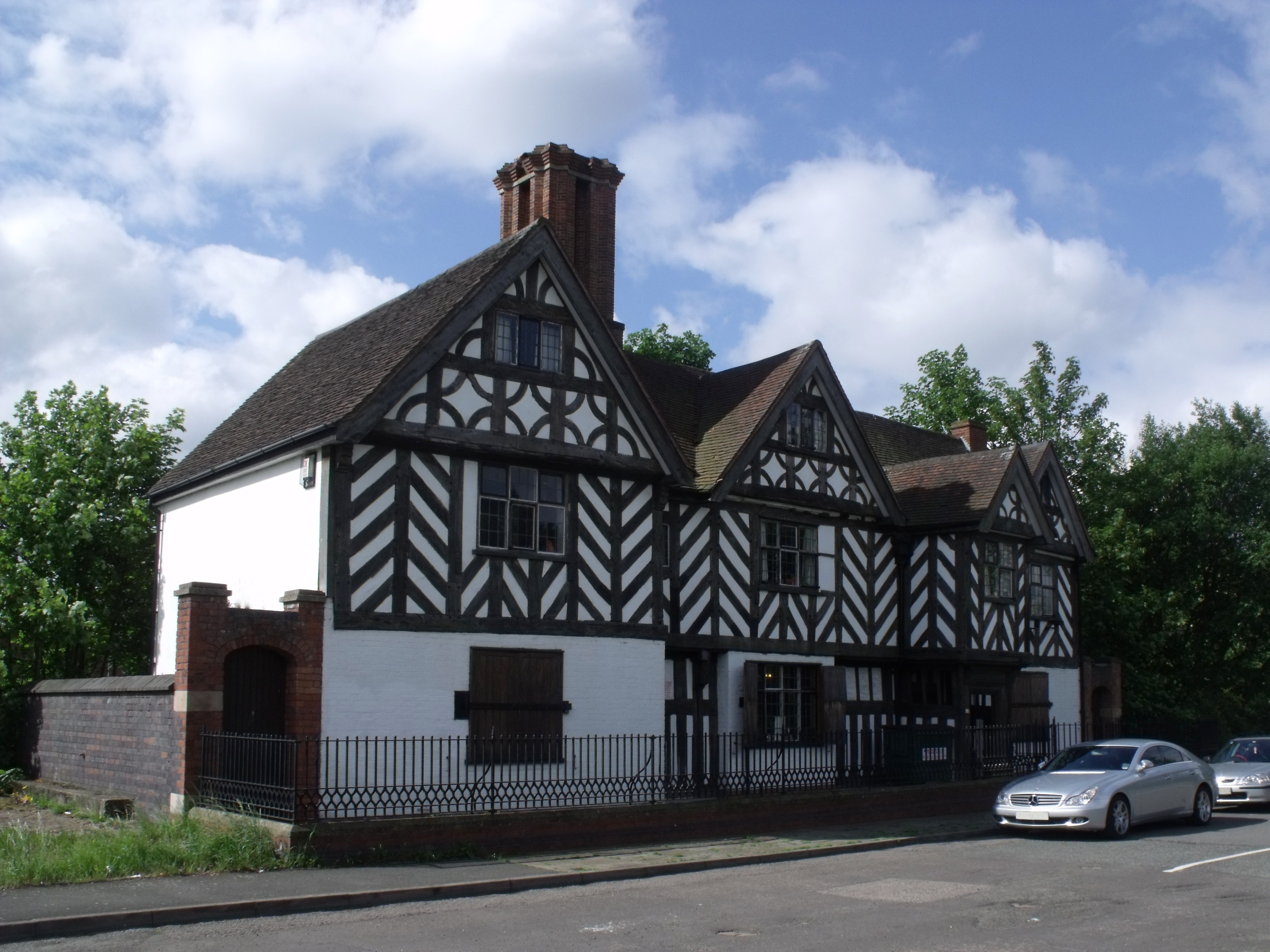
The house in 2010

Stratford House is a Grade II* listed house in the Highgate area of Birmingham, England. Dating from 1601, it is located near Camp Hill traffic island. It was built by Ambrose and Bridget Rotton whose initials are carved over the porch. There is also an insurance plate on the front. The house was originally located on a 20-acre (8.1 ha) farm owned by Ambrose, who kept sheep, oxen, cows and pigs.

In 1840, the Midland Railway opened a goods yard at nearby Camp Hill. In 1926, the company's successor, the London, Midland and Scottish railway purchased the house with a view to demolishing it. There was a public outcry and the house was saved. There were further plans to demolish the house in 1950 as it was in a dilapidated state. However, it was bought in 1954 by Ivon Adams who restored it.

During the late 1980s and early 1990s Stratford House provided office accommodation for Network Records, one of the leading UK exponents of techno music.

In January 2015 the Birmingham Mail reported that Stratford House was being used as a swingers' club, trading under the name Tudor Lounge. The occupants had signed a ten-year lease in March 2014 and had obtained permission from Birmingham City Council to use the building as a 'private members meeting venue'. Local residents later raised objections. Late on 28 December 2015, the building was damaged by fire.

Following acceptance in April 2016 of a detailed planning application the building was extensively refurbished and is, as of 2020, occupied by Age UK Birmingham and Age UK Sandwell (separate local-focused charities from the national Age UK.)

In April 2021 Birmingham City Council approved plans for the road at the front of Stratford House to be closed and a Knott garden to be created.
