= Allen Edward Everitt =

English architectural artist and illustrator

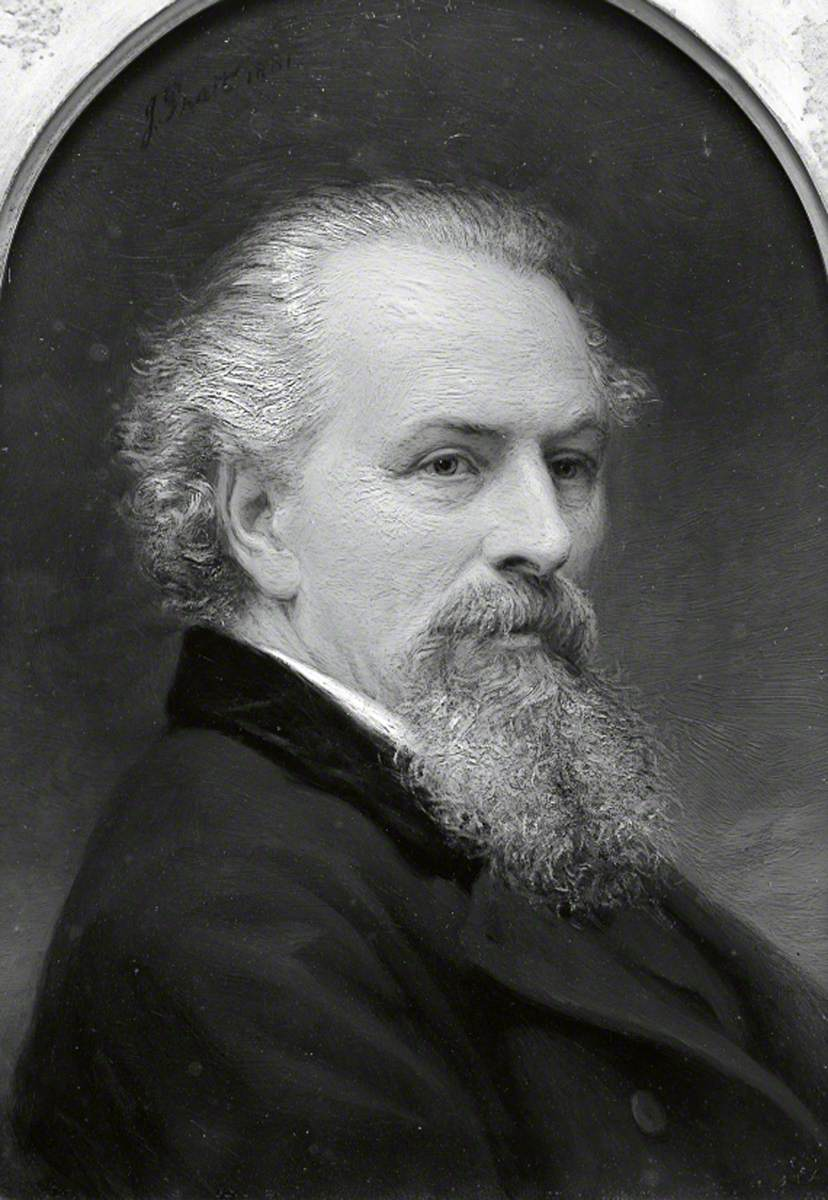
- Portrait of Allen Edward Everitt, 1881
- Born: 10 April 1824; 59 Newhall Street, Birmingham
- Died: 11 June 1882 (aged 58); Edgbaston
- Resting place: Edgbaston Parish Church
- Occupations: Architectural artist and illustrator

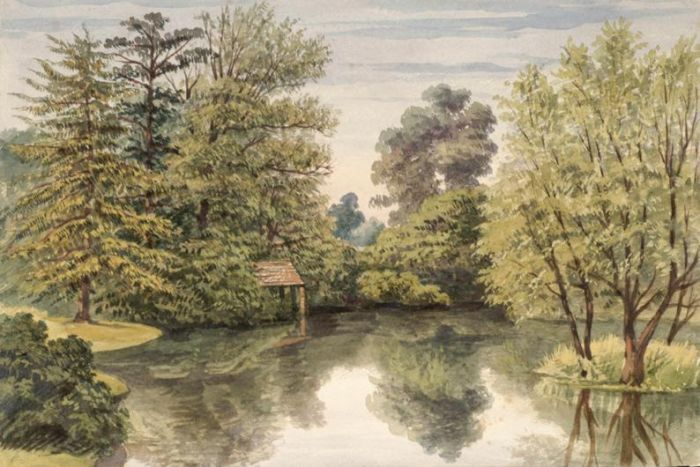
Soho Pool, Handsworth

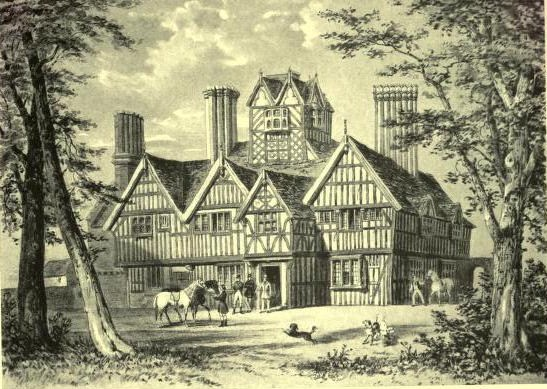
Oak House, West Bromwich

Allen Edward Everitt (10 April 1824 – 11 June 1882) was an English architectural artist and illustrator. He was a leading artist in the Birmingham area between 1850 and 1880, and his work is a valuable historical record of local buildings of that period.

== Life and work ==
Everitt was born at 59 Newhall Street, Birmingham, the son of Edward Everitt, an art dealer, and grandson of Allen Everitt, a well-known local artist and art teacher. His maternal grandfather was David Parkes, the Shropshire antiquarian. He showed an early talent for art and received lessons from David Cox, with whom he remained a friend. His specialty was drawing old buildings and their interiors. Taking Birmingham as a centre he made careful drawings of almost every spot in the Midlands of archaeological or historical interest. Between the ages of thirty and forty, he made painting tours of Belgium, France and Germany. After this, he devoted himself particularly to building interiors, his work being mainly carried out in watercolour.

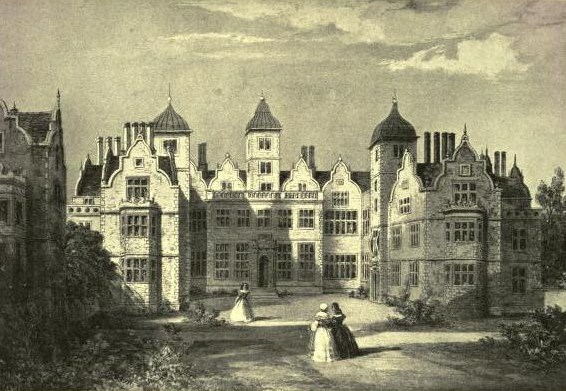
Aston Hall nr. Birmingham

In 1857, Everitt joined the Royal Birmingham Society of Artists, becoming, in 1858, honorary secretary, a post he held until his death. He taught drawing for many years at the Deaf and Dumb Institution in Church Road, Edgbaston, of which he was also, virtually, the secretary. In 1870, the archaeological section of the Midlands Institute was formed, and Everitt was appointed one of its honorary secretaries. He contributed to its journal, Transactions, with articles on "Aston Church", "Handsworth Church and its surroundings", "Archaeological researches ten miles around Birmingham", "Northfield Church", "Hampton-in-Arden", "Old houses in the Midlands" etc. He was also, for a time, a member of the general council of the Institute. In June 1880, he was appointed honorary curator of the municipal "Birmingham Free Art Gallery", the forerunner of the Birmingham Museum and Art Gallery.

In 1854, Everitt completed a series of drawings of Aston Hall, in Warwickshire, which were used to illustrate Alfred Davidson's History of the Holtes of Aston, Baronets, with a description of the family mansion (see bibliography). He also illustrated John Thackray Bunce's History of old St. Martin's (1875), the parish church of Birmingham.

== Personal life ==
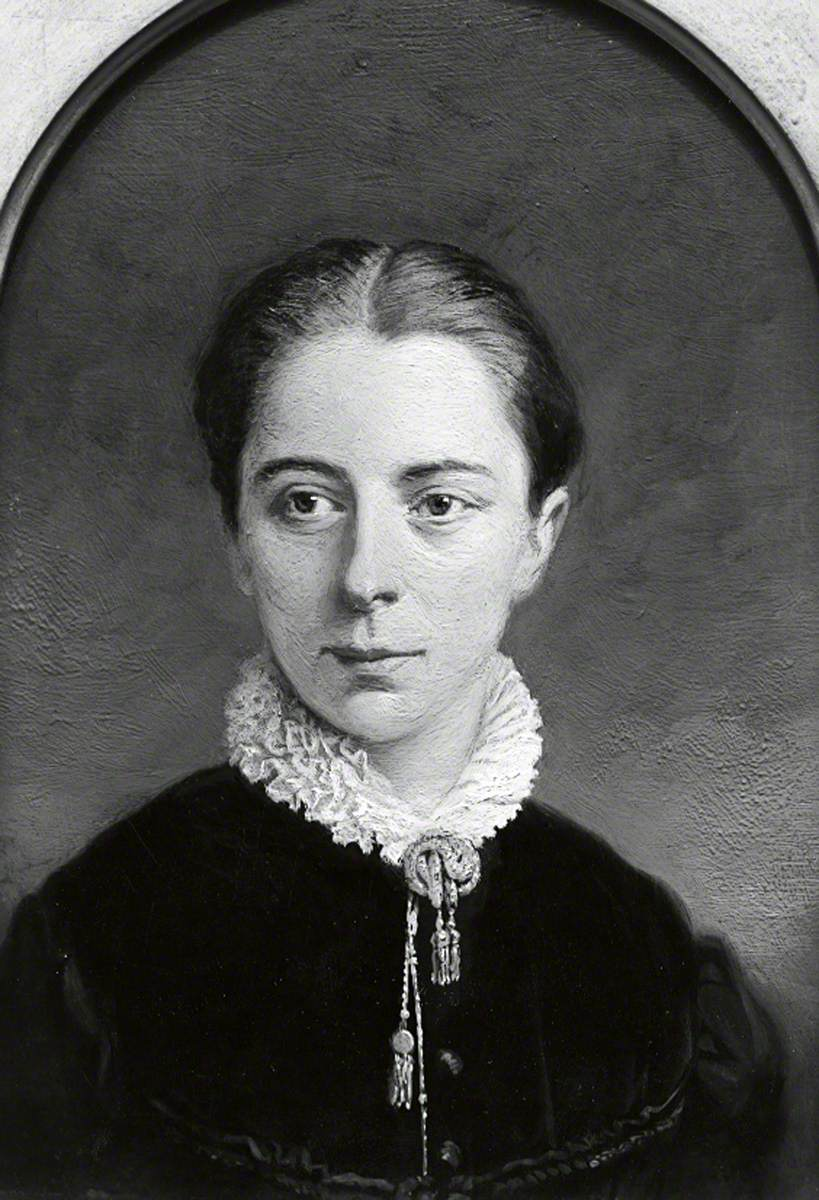
Frances Everitt

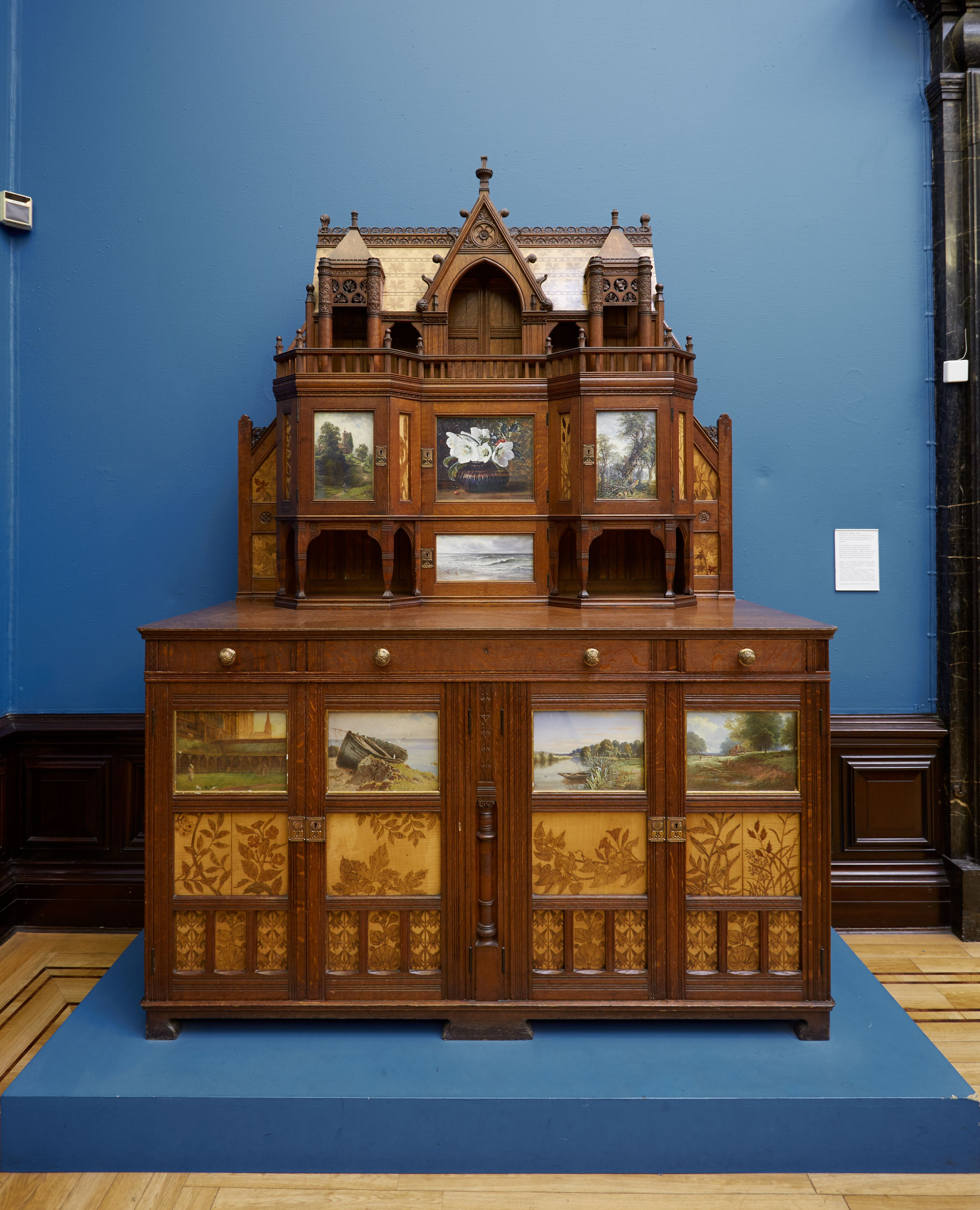
Everitt cabinet

In 1880, Everitt married Frances Hudson. They received as a gift from the RBSA a magnificent carved and painted cabinet designed by J. H. Chamberlain (known as the Everitt cabinet; Birmingham Museum and Art Gallery).

He died on 11 June 1882, at Edgbaston, where he had lived most of his life, of "congestion of the lungs"; He was buried at Edgbaston on 16 June. His very large collection of sketches has proved to be an invaluable historical record of buildings in the Birmingham area, many of which no longer exist. A warm tribute to Everitt was published by the Birmingham Daily Post.

Frances died at Southend-on-Sea on 10 August 1889, age 54. She was buried at St Bartholomew's Church, Edgbaston, alongside her husband.

== See also ==
- Art of Birmingham

== Bibliography ==
Books featuring illustrations by Everitt:

- Davidson, Alfred (1854). A history of the Holtes of Aston etc. Birmingham: E. Everitt.
- Hall, Samuel Carter (1858). The baronial halls, and ancient picturesque edifices of England etc. Vol. 1. Willis & Sotheran.
- Bunce, John Thackray (1875). History of Old St. Martin's, Birmingham. Birmingham: Cornish Brothers.
- Holme, Charles (1915). Old English mansions etc. London: The Studio.
