= Myra Louise Bunce =

English designer and painter

- Born: 1854; Birmingham, Warwickshire, England
- Died: 1919 (aged 64–65)
- Education: Birmingham School of Art
- Movement: Arts and Crafts movement

Myra Louise Bunce (1854–1919) was an English designer, metalworker and painter associated with the Arts and Crafts movement and the Pre-Raphaelites.

== Family ==
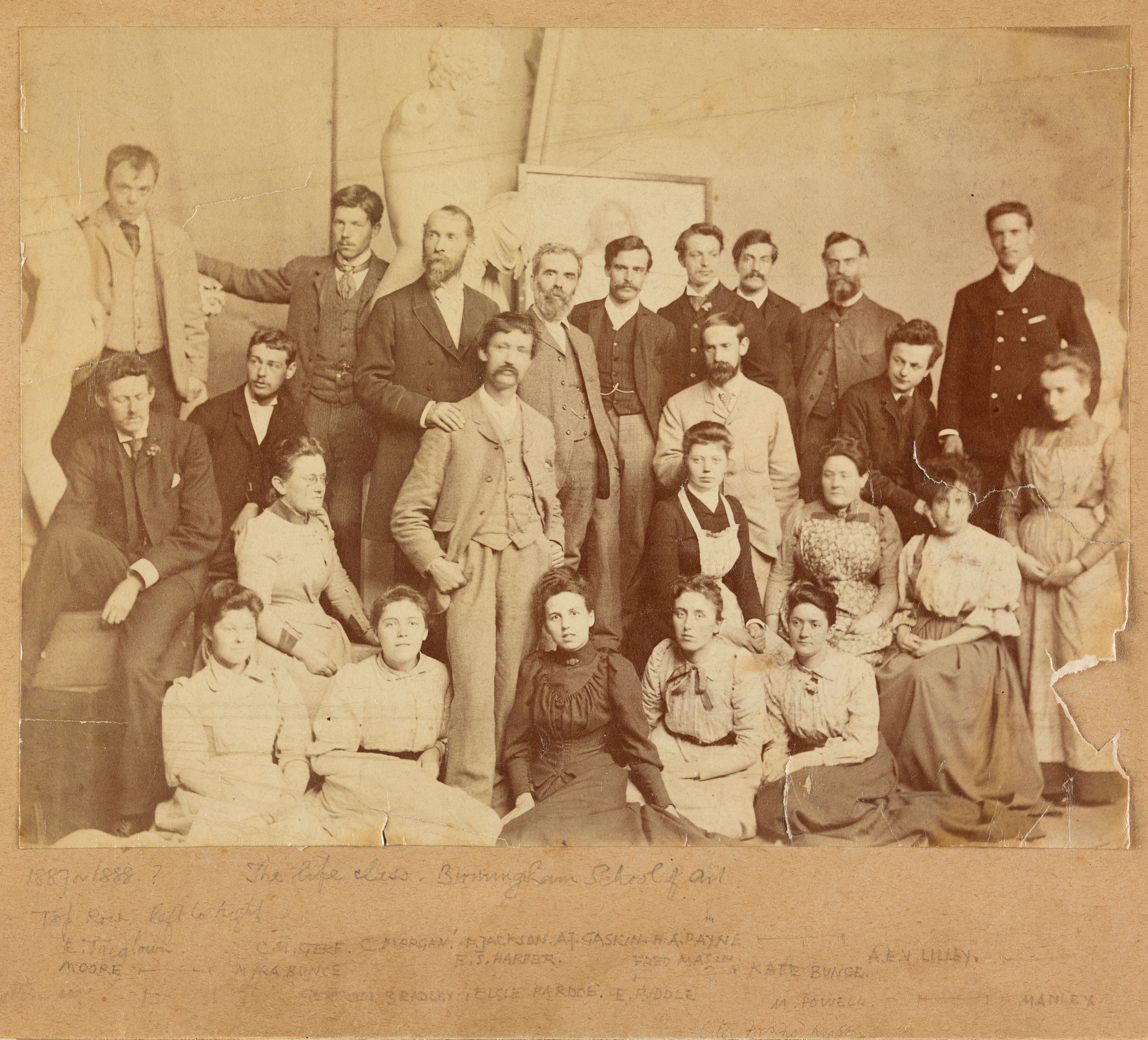
The Life Class Birmingham School of Art 1888

Bunce was born in Birmingham, Warwickshire. She was the elder daughter of John Thackray Bunce and Rebecca Ann Bunce (née Cheesewright). Her younger sister Kate Bunce was also a painter.

== Education ==
Bunce studied primarily at the Birmingham School of Art (1879–1891) although she also submitted pieces for examination to South Kensington School of Art. The Birmingham School of Art that provided the springboard for Bunce's career as a designer; unusually it encouraged both men and women to design and make objects in a variety of materials and thus led to her interest in metalworking.

== Career ==
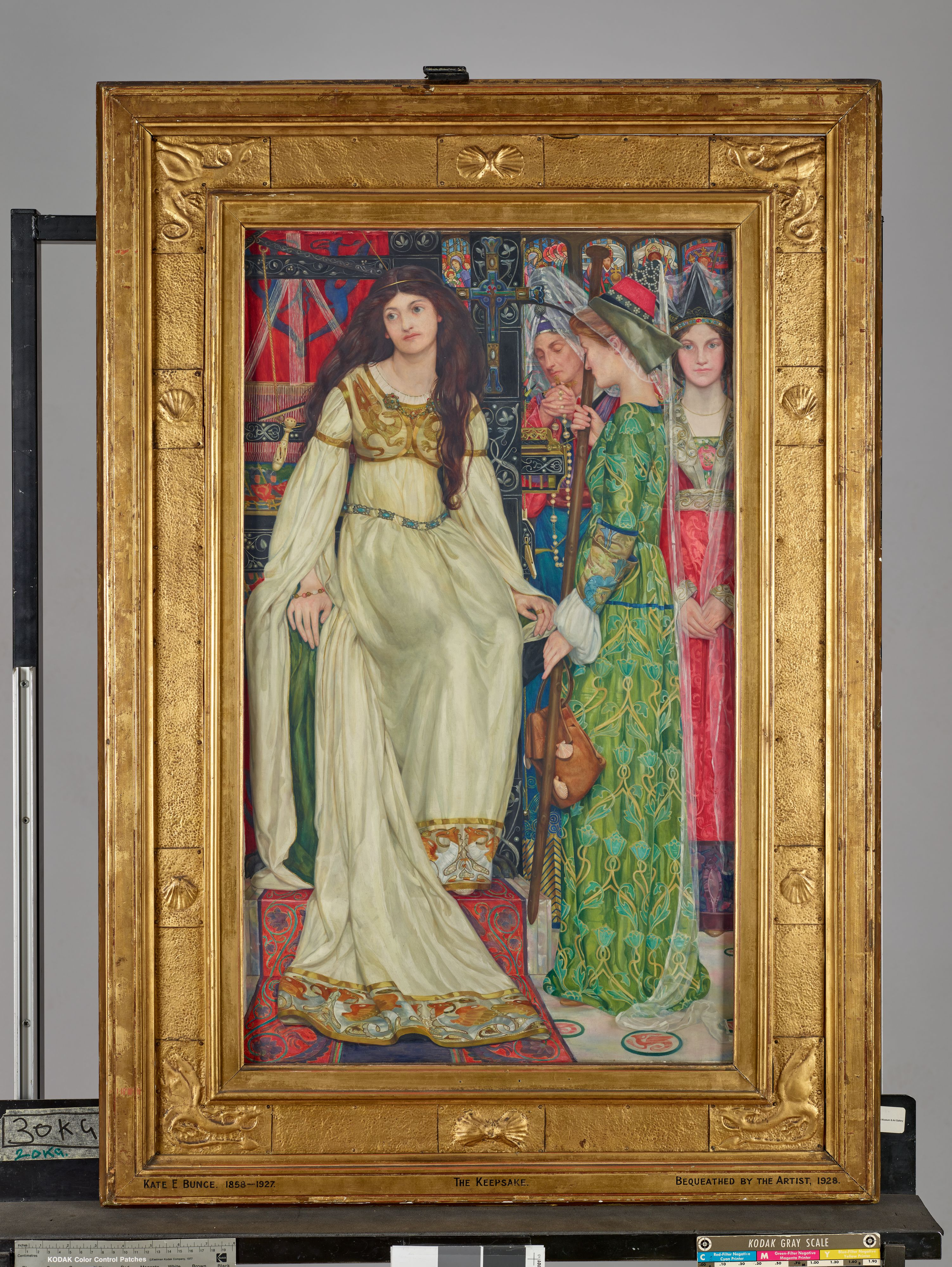
The Keepsake: Kate Bunce showing the frame by Myra Bunce

Although Bunce worked as an artist, exhibiting pieces at the Royal Academy, the Society of Women Artists and also locally in Birmingham and Walsall, she is best known for her metalworking.

In particular with her sister she created two reredos: one for St Mary's Longworth, Oxfordshire and another for St Albans Church, Birmingham. For both of these she created the hand beaten framing to hold the painted panels. The use of metal rather than moulded gesso is one of the features that distinguishes Bunce's work from that of her contemporaries.

Amongst her other work is the frame that holds Kate Bunce's painting The Keepsake.

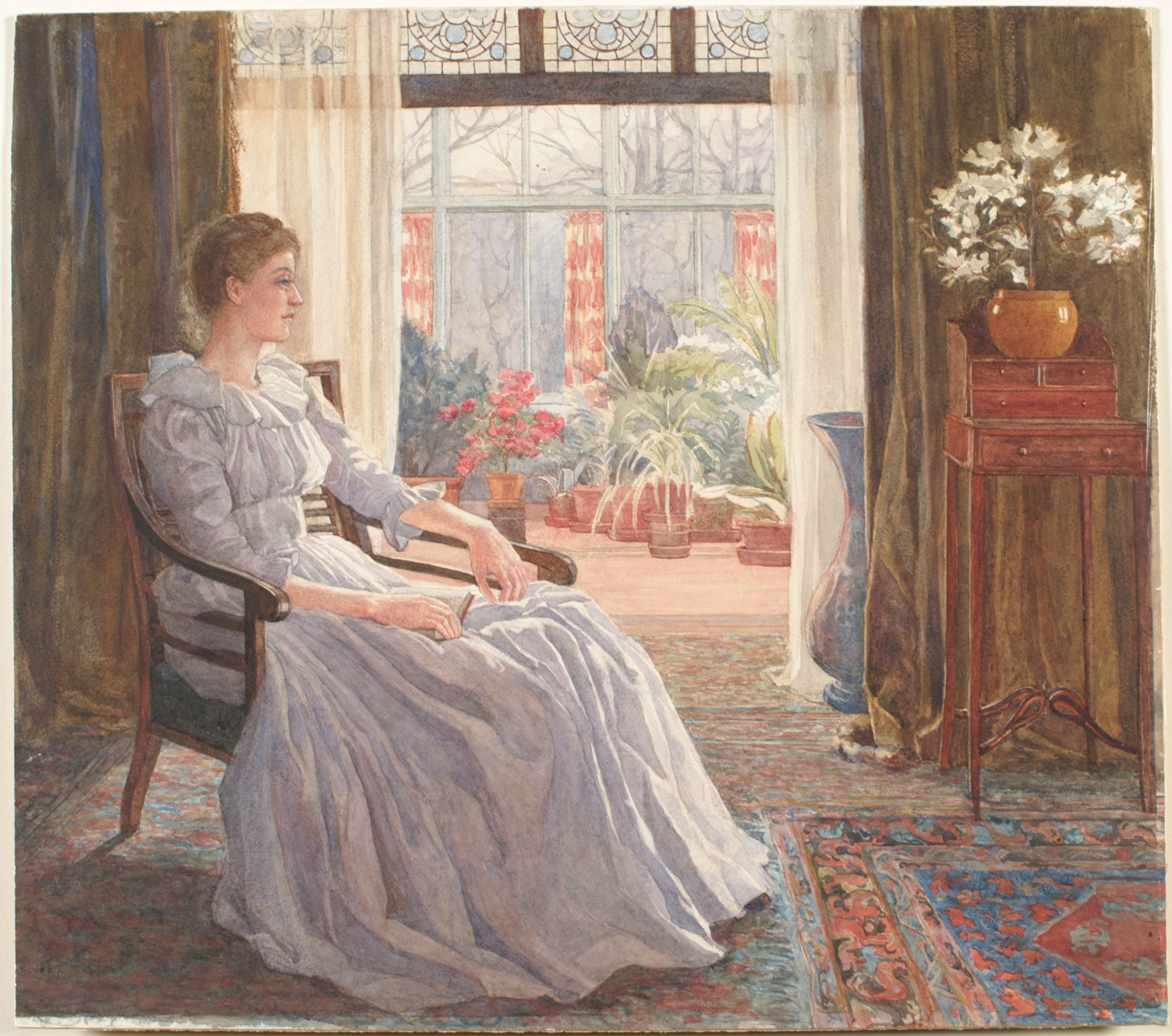
Untitled Work by Bunce, commonly referred to as The Sitting Room
