= John Thackray Bunce =

British journalist and author (1828–1899)

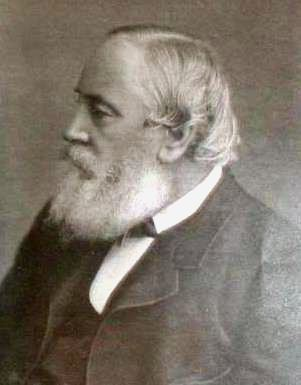
- Born: 11 April 1828; Faringdon, Berkshire, England
- Died: 28 June 1899 (aged 71); Longworth, Priory Road, Edgbaston, Birmingham
- Children: Kate Bunce; Myra Bunce

John Thackray Bunce (11 April 1828 – 28 June 1899) was a British journalist and writer. He served as editor of Aris's Birmingham Gazette from 1860 to 1862, and of the Birmingham Post from 1862 to 1898.

== Early years ==
Bunce was born in Faringdon, Berkshire, to John Bunce, watchmaker and silversmith, and his wife, Mary, née Clapham. Mary's mother's maiden name had been Thackray. The family moved to Birmingham when Bunce was nine and he attended Gem Street elementary branch school, operated by the Foundation of the Schools of King Edward VI.

== Journalism ==
Aged 14, Bunce left school and began work as a printer's apprentice with the Midland Counties Herald, a newspaper. He was given a job as a reporter after writing a letter, anonymously, calling for Birmingham to have an art gallery. He left the Herald in 1852 to work for another Birmingham paper, Aris's Birmingham Gazette, and was promoted as its editor in 1860. The Gazette followed a tory line and Bunce was increasingly of a liberal persuasion, eventually resigning after hearing an address by John Bright. In 1862, he became editor of the more liberal Birmingham Daily Post.

An antiquarian, he wrote a number of books on the history of Birmingham institutions and people, including St Martin's church, the artist David Cox and industrialist Josiah Mason, as well as books for children.

He also wrote for The Fortnightly Review, Macmillan's Magazine, and National Review and became a founding fellow of the Institute of Journalists (later the Chartered Institute of Journalists) in 1889.

== Politics ==
In 1877, Bunce was a founder member of the National Liberal Federation. He resigned his positions in Liberal Party organizations in 1886, during internal disputes over Irish home rule, but lent his support to the imperial policies of Joseph Chamberlain in 1888.

== Civic life ==
Retaining ties with his former school, Bunce became a governor and bailiff of the King Edward VI Foundation's Grammar School. He sat on the committee that developed Birmingham's first Central Library, and was an organizer of the National Education League.

He advocated for the foundation of the Birmingham Municipal School of Art, and spoke in favour of both education and "free and open" careers for women.

Bunce served as a trustee of Mason Science College (the predecessor college of the University of Birmingham), and as a magistrate, and was a patron of Birmingham Museum and Art Gallery, and a fellow of the Royal Statistical Society.

== Legacy ==
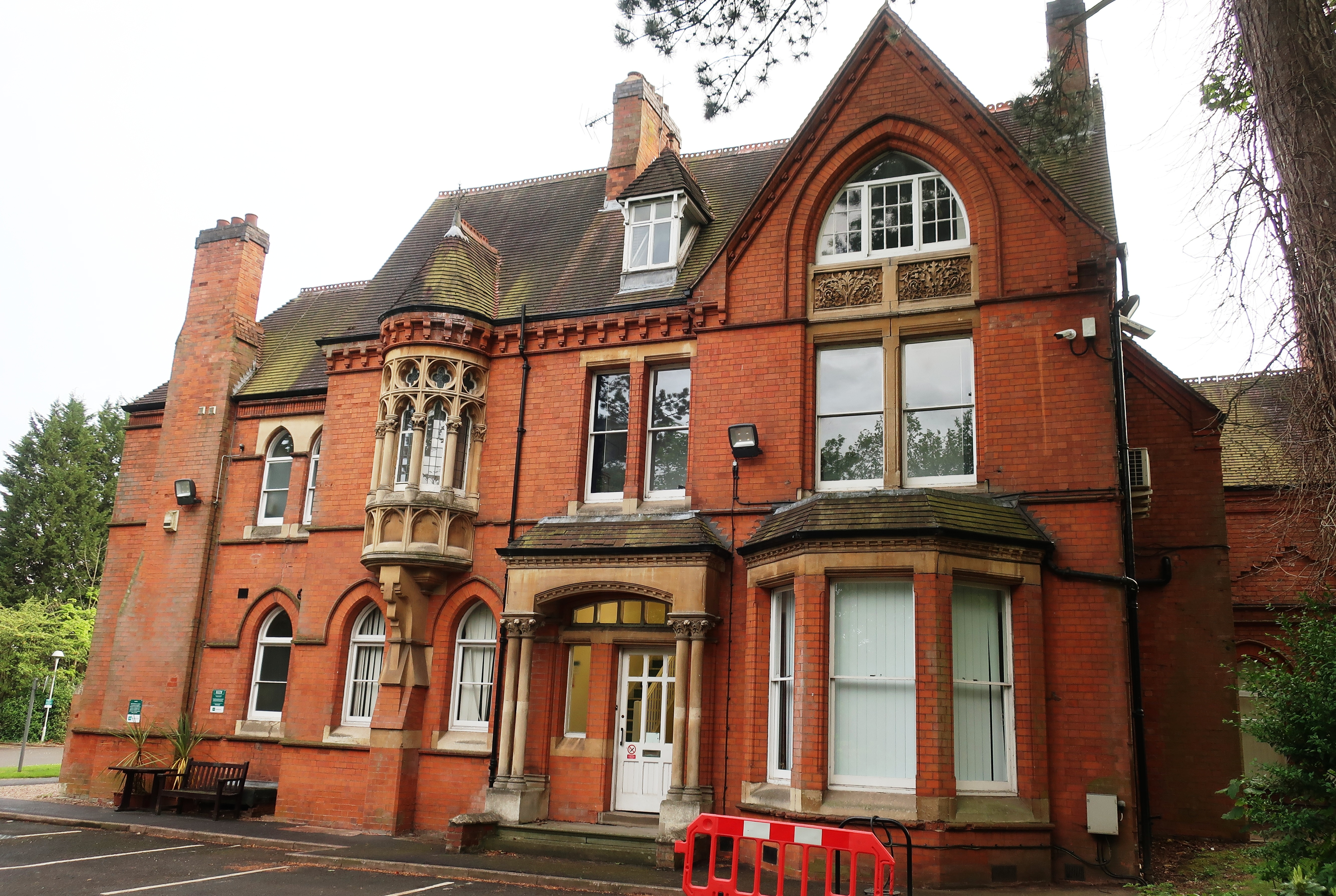
Bunce's home at 24 Priory Road, Edgbaston, designed by Harris & Martin, 1878–1879

Bunce, having retired in 1898, died on 28 June 1899 at home, of heart failure. He had been due to be given an enamelled silver commemorative casket, created by Florence Camm and Violet Holden, to mark his being granted the freedom of the city of Birmingham on 21 March 1899. The casket is now in the collection of Birmingham Museum and Art Gallery.

Bunce married Rebecca Ann Cheesewright (1823/4–1891) on 5 July 1849. She predeceased him, and both are buried at Edgbaston Old Church. Two of their daughters were the artists Kate Bunce and Myra Bunce. Two other daughters died in infancy, another as a young woman.

Their home, "Longworth", at 24 Priory Road, Edgbaston, was designed for Bunce by William Harris and Henry Martin. It is now part of the Priory Hospital and grade II listed.

A collection of manuscripts acquired by Bunce, as well as some of his own correspondence, is now in the Cadbury Research Library at the University of Birmingham.

== Bibliography ==
- Cloudland and Shadowland, a Story for Children. 1868.
- A History of the Birmingham General Hospital and the Musical Festivals. Birmingham: Cornish Brothers. 1873.
- History of Old St. Martin's, Birmingham. Illustrated by Allen Edward Everitt. Birmingham: Cornish Brothers. 1875.
- Fairy Tales: Their Origin and Meaning. 1878.
- History of the Corporation of Birmingham; with a sketch of the earlier government of the town. Vol. 1. 1878.
- History of the Corporation of Birmingham; with a sketch of the earlier government of the town. Vol. 2. 1885.
- Hall, William (1881). A Biography of David Cox: With Remarks on His Works and Genius. Editied with additions, by Bunce.
- Life of Sir Josiah Mason, with History of Electro-plating and Steel Pen Making. Printed for private circulation. 1890.
