= Highgate Park =

Park in Highgate, Birmingham, England

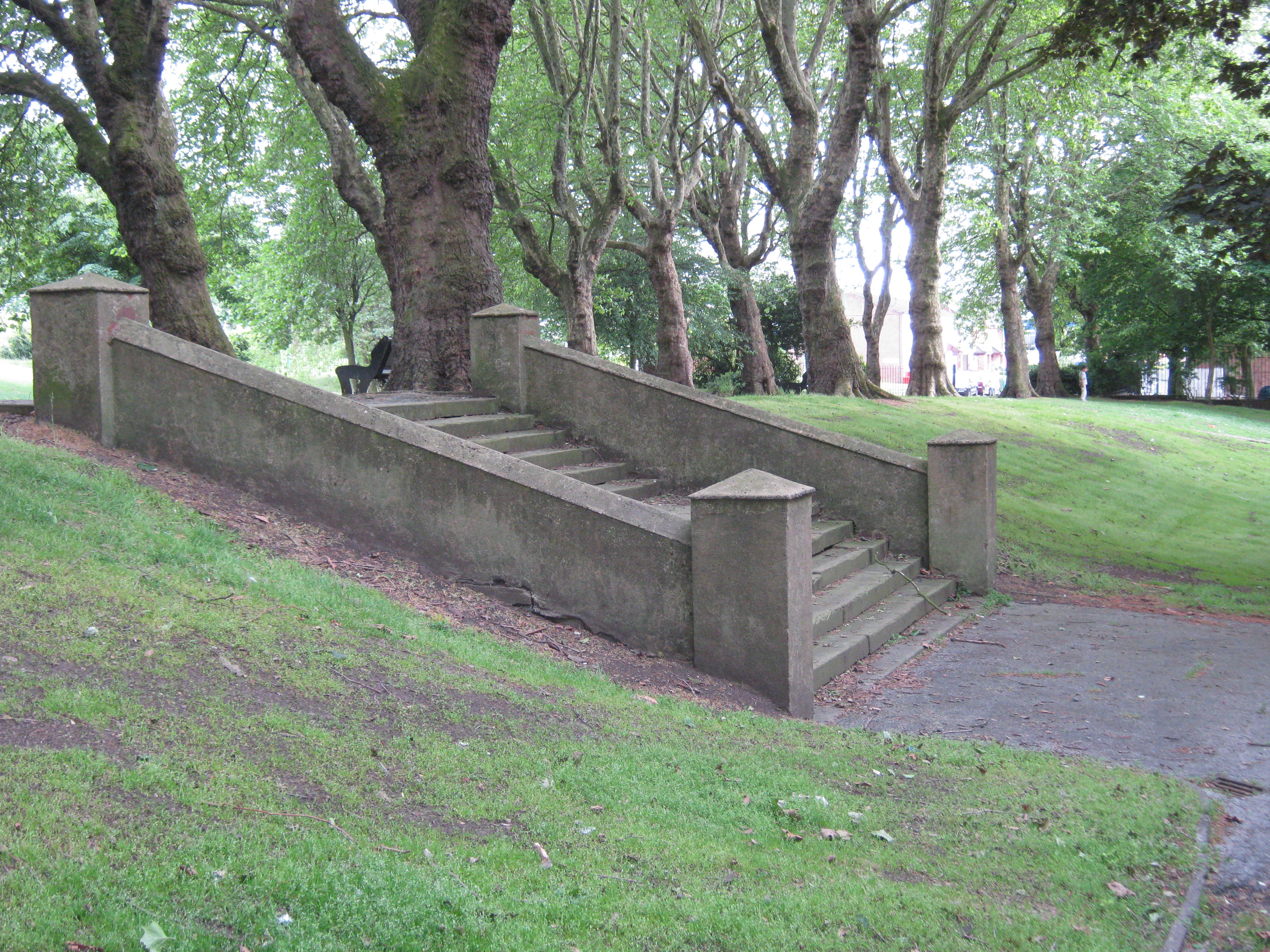
- Interactive map of Highgate Park
- Location: Highgate, Birmingham, England
- Coordinates: 52°28′10″N 1°53′01″W
- Operator: Birmingham City Council

Highgate Park is a public park in Highgate, Birmingham, England.

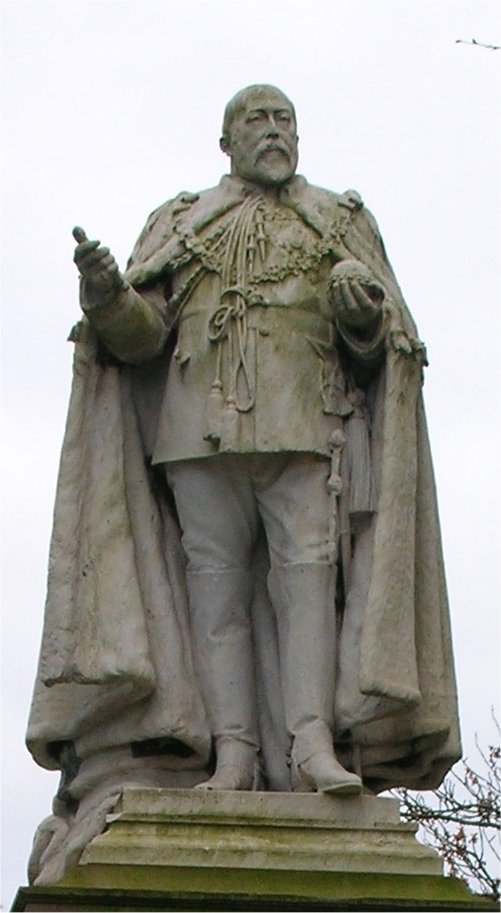
Edward VII statue in Highgate Park, 2007

Highgate Park stands on land that was originally owned by Elizabeth Hollier, who used it for grazing. When Elizabeth died her will stated that the land was to be used for charity. The four fields were to be rented out, and twelve poor people of Aston Parish and twelve poor people of Birmingham Parish were to be clothed with the money each year. In 1875, the Trustees of Elizabeth Hollier's Charity wanted to develop the land for industry, but Birmingham Corporation bought it for a park. The part of the park near Alcester Street was later asphalted to serve as a playground. Highgate Park was also home to Birmingham's King Edward VII Memorial, but that was moved to the city centre in 2011.

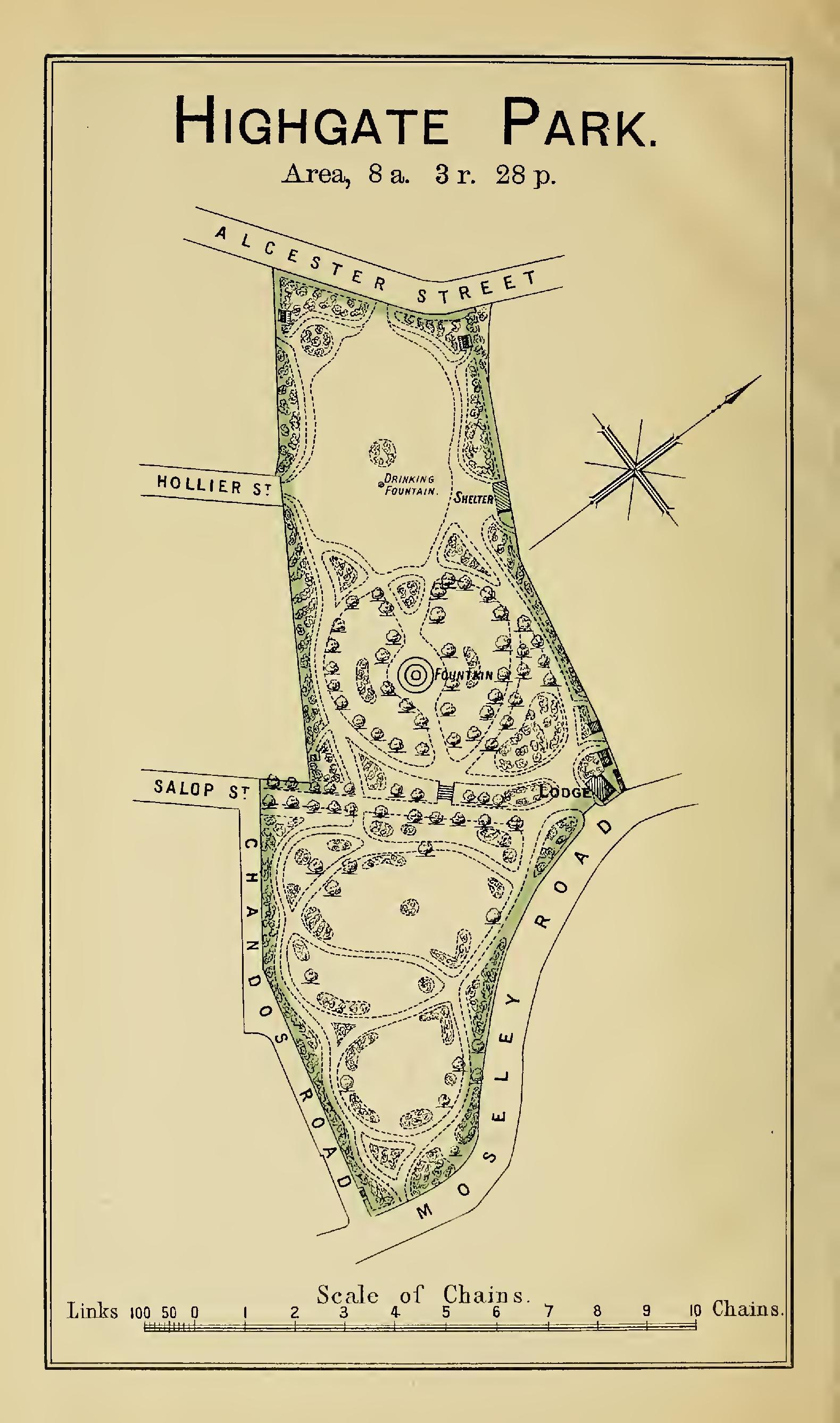
1892 plan of the park

Alongside the park, is the 'Paragon Hotel'. This was originally a Rowton House for single working men. It is now attracting business people attending the many conventions in Birmingham and tourists visiting the city.
