= St Alban the Martyr, Birmingham =

- Church of St Alban and St Patrick, Highgate, Birmingham
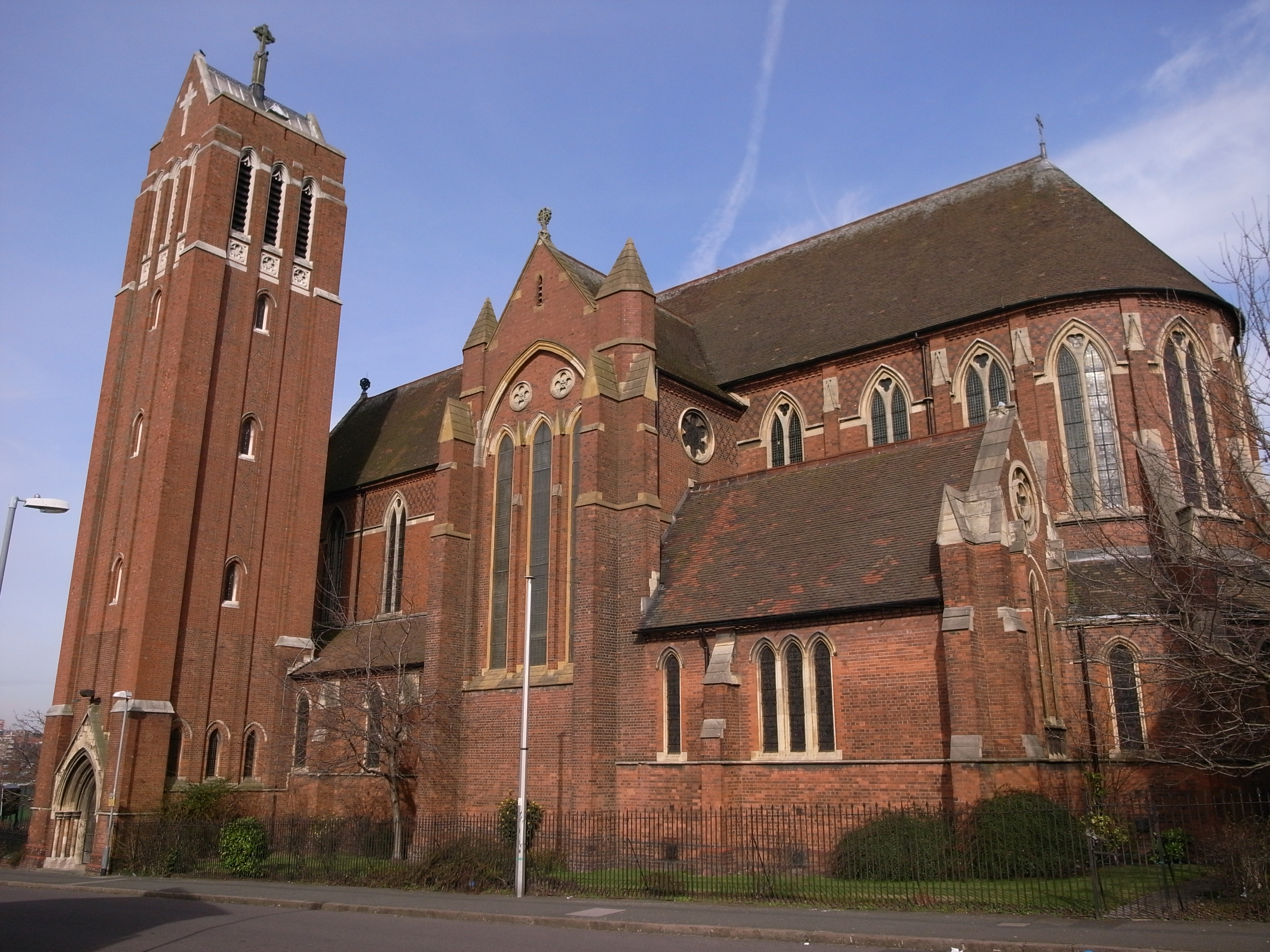
- St Alban the Martyr, Birmingham
- St Alban the Martyr, Birmingham
- 52°27′57″N 1°53′18″W
- OS grid reference: SP 07664 85337
- Location: Conybere Street, Highgate, Birmingham
- Country: England
- Denomination: Church of England
- Churchmanship: Anglo-Catholic
- Website: www.saintalban.co.uk

History
- Dedication: Saint Alban
- Consecrated: 4 December 1899

Architecture
- Heritage designation: Grade II* listed
- Designated: 25 April 1952
- Architect: John Loughborough Pearson
- Architectural type: Gothic revival architecture
- Groundbreaking: 31 January 1880
- Completed: 3 May 1881
- Construction cost: £20,000

Specifications
- Length: 130 feet (40 m)
- Width: 76 feet (23 m)
- Height: 170 feet (52 m)

Administration
- Diocese: Anglican Diocese of Birmingham
- Archdeaconry: Birmingham
- Deanery: Central Birmingham
- Parish: Highgate

St Alban the Martyr, Birmingham is a Grade II* listed Church of England parish church in the Anglican Diocese of Birmingham. It is dedicated to Saint Alban, the first British Christian martyr.

== History ==
A temporary church was established as a mission of Holy Trinity Church, Bordesley in 1865 and opened on 13 September 1866.

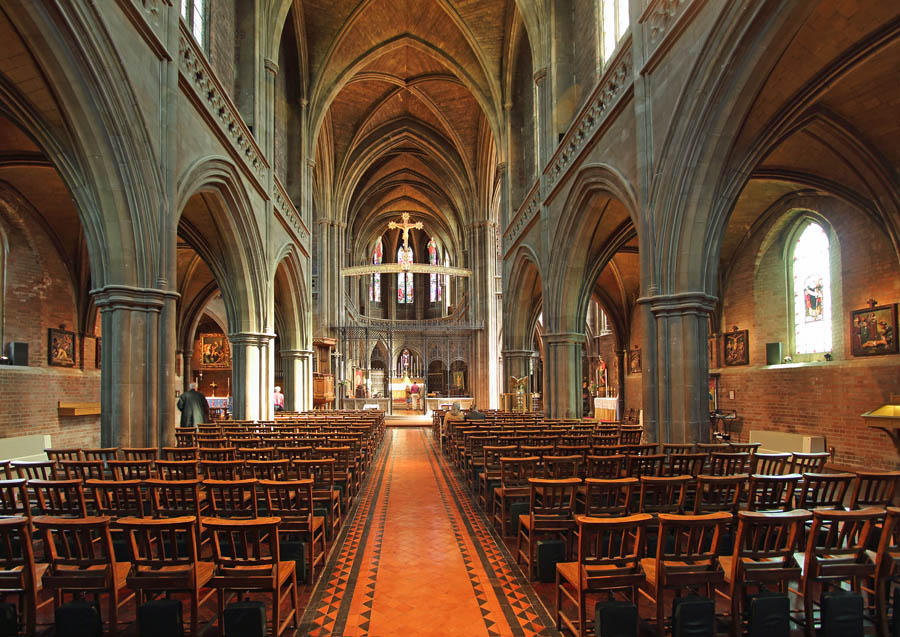
The nave and chancel

The permanent church was designed by John Loughborough Pearson and built by the contractor Shillitoe of Doncaster. The foundation stone was laid on 31 January 1880 by Frederick Lygon, 6th Earl Beauchamp and the church opened for worship on Tuesday 3 May 1881

The formal consecration took place on 4 December 1899. The construction cost was in the region of £20,000 (equivalent to £2,197,041 in 2025).

The tower and spire were added in 1938 by Edwin Francis Reynolds.

St Alban's Church took over the parish of St Patrick's Church, Bordesley when St Patrick's was demolished in the early 1970s.

In 2016 a grant from the Heritage Lottery permitted the renewal of the roofs of the South Transept, St Patrick's Chapel, the Organ Loft and the Ambulatory. However, despite this, by 2018 the church was on Historic England's Heritage at Risk Register due to its poor condition, particularly the remainder of the roof. However, a programme of restoration took place in 2020-21, the remainder of the church roof was repaired and high-level repairs to the windows and walls were carried out. As a result Historic England removed the church from the list of "Buildings at Risk".

=== Present day ===
The patron is Keble College, Oxford.

St Alban's Church stands in the Anglo-Catholic tradition of the Church of England. The parish had passed Resolutions A and B of the Priests (Ordination of Women) Measure 1993, meaning they rejected the ordination of women, but these expired in 2016. They also voted on Alternative Episcopal Oversight, but this was rejected. In 2017, they voted on the replacement of Resolutions A and B, the Resolution under the House of Bishops' Declaration: "This was not carried, with equal votes for and against." This means that the parish would now accept a woman priest.

== Architecture ==
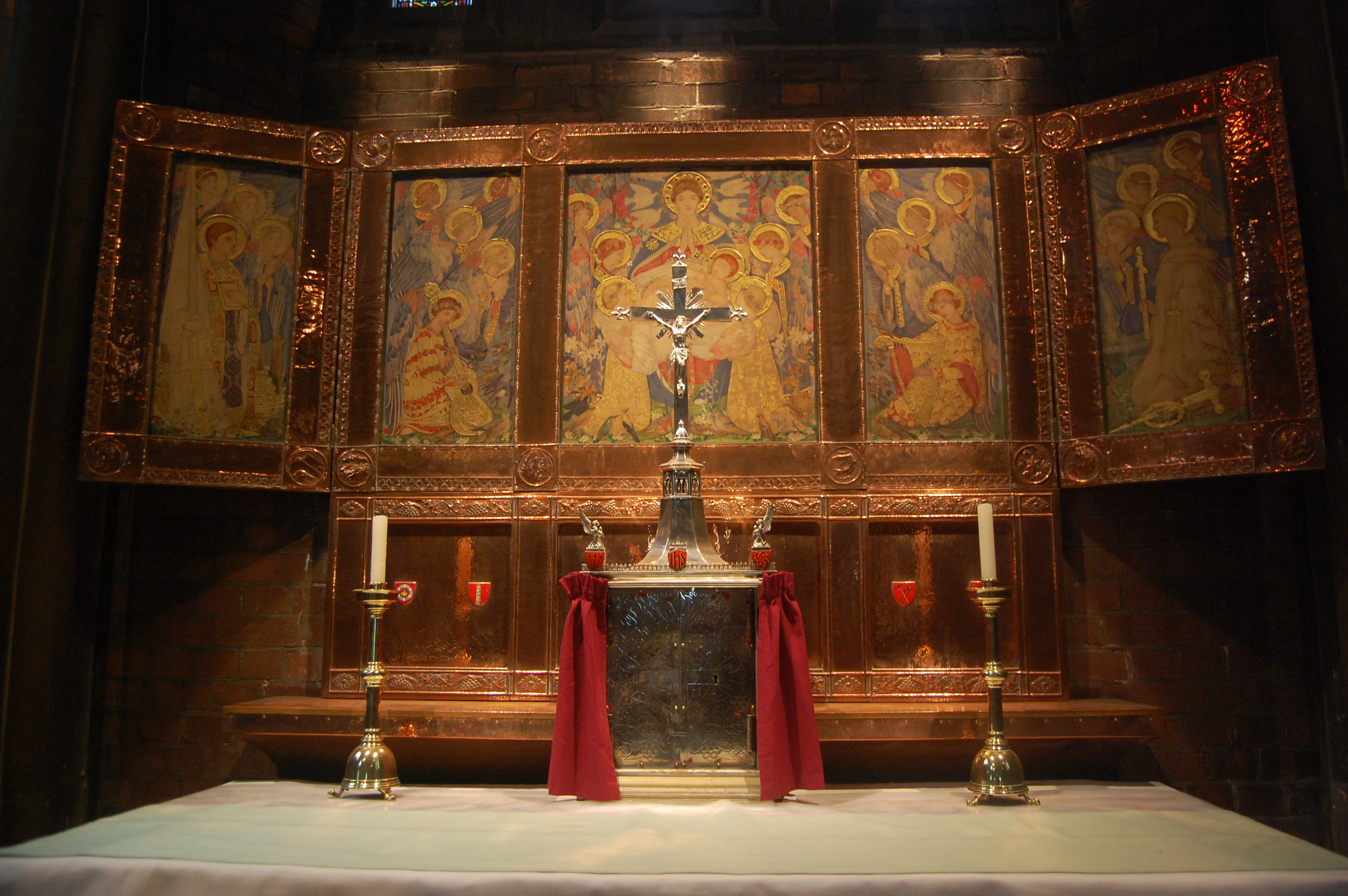
The reredos, and 1938 silver tabernacle

The cruciform building is in red brick, with dressings in ashlar.

The interior features a stained glass east window by Henry Payne and, in the south chapel, a copper Arts and Crafts triptych with painted panels, by local artists Kate and Myra Bunce and donated by them in 1919 in memory of their sisters and parents.

A Birmingham Civic Society blue plaque honouring the Bunce sisters was unveiled at St Alban's in September 2015, by the Lord Mayor of Birmingham.

== Vicars ==
- 1865 – 1894: James Samuel Pollock
- 1895 – 1896: Thomas Benson Pollock
- 1897 – 1900: George Philip Trevelyan
- 1900 – 1910: Canon Alfred Cecil Scott
- 1910 – 1911: Mark Napier Trollope
- 1911 – 1923: Francis Underhill
- 1923 – 1953: Dudley Clark
- 1953 – 1981: Canon Lawrence Goodrich Harding
- 1982 – 1986: David Handley Hutt
- 1987 – 1993: Michael Hedley Bryant
- 1995 – 2004: Canon James G. Pendorf
- 2005 – 2010: Canon John Hervé
- 2011 – 2013: Dr Pervaiz Sultan
- 2013 – 2016: Dr Nicholas lo Polito
- 2017–present: Dr Gerald Sykes

== Organ ==
The organ dates was installed second-hand in 1870 and was by Bryceson Son & Ellis. It was overhauled in 1940 by Rushworth and Dreaper of Liverpool who extended the compass to C and added electro-pneumatic action. The Pedal Trombone, Great Tuba and Swell 5-rank mixture were added at this date. A new oak organ case was created by Birmingham Sculptors Ltd and Craftinwood Ltd. A specification of the organ can be found on the National Pipe Organ Register.

=== Organists ===
- Mr. Price. c. 1868
- Hugh Brooksbank 1881 (afterwards organist of Llandaff Cathedral)
- Douglas Redman 1882-1885 (afterwards organist of St Matthew's Church, Brixton)
- T.J. Woodall 1885-????
- J. Granville Smith 1889-1899 (formerly organist of St Ambrose's Church, Edgbaston, from 1890 also organist at Christ Church, Wolverhampton)
- W. E. Abraham 1899–1901
- William Terrence Jenkins 1901–1910
- Alban W. Cooper 1910-1911
- Thomas J. Richards 1911 – 1919 (formerly and afterwards organist of St Agnes' Church, Moseley)
- George Henry Manton 1919-1923
- Ernest Edward Madeley 1923–1953
- Roy Massey 1953–1960 (afterwards organist of St Augustine's Church, Edgbaston)
- David Britton 1960-1961
- Raymond Isaacson 1961–1967 (formerly organist of St Nicolas Church, Kings Norton, afterwards organist of High Wycombe parish church)
- Alistair Pow 1968
- John Bates 1969-1970
- Paul Hale 1970-1971
- Roy Hayton 1971-1976
- John Butt 1977-1979
- David Briggs 1979–1981
- Iain Simcock 1981-1983
- Ian Ledsham 1983-1991
- Colin Kinton 1992-1997
- Darren Hogg 1998-2004
- Chris Harker 2004-2018
- David Lane 2006-2011
- Thomas Keogh 2011-2012
- Graeme Martin 2013-2019
- Aled Liddington 2022-2024
- Angela Sones 2024-present

== See also ==
- Ark St Alban's Academy
