= Evelyn Holden =

Artist and book illustrator and designer (1877–1960)

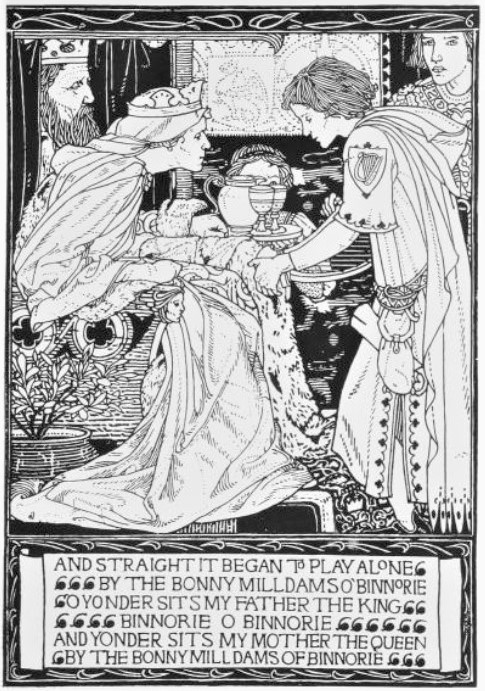
- Evelyn Holden's Illustration “Binorie, O Binnorie” in The Yellow Book
- Born: 1877; Acocks Green, Birmingham, England
- Died: c. 1960
- Occupation: Illustrator
- Spouse: Frank Matthews

Evelyn Holden (1877 – c.1960) was a book illustrator and designer as well as an artist.

== Biography ==
Evelyn Holden was one of the younger children of Emma Wearing Holden, an ex-governess and writer and her husband the industrialist Arthur Holden. There were another four other sisters including Effie Margaret Holden, Violet Mary Holden and Edith Holden and two brothers. The family originally lived in a large house in Acocks Green, outside Birmingham though in 1880 they moved further into the countryside to Darley Green, in Packwood. Art, poetry, nature and books were a constant in the house. The daughters were educated at home while the sons were sent away to school.

In 1890 Holden and her sister Violet attended the Birmingham School of Art where Edith was already enrolled. The family moved to Gowan Bank, a house much closer to the train line making the daily commute into the city a simpler process. The house was a regular destination for socialists and spiritualists to visit the Holden parents whenever they visited to speak in Birmingham. The Holden family regularly held seances and put on theatrical productions in the chapel in the garden.

Once again the family moved in 1897 to Dorridge, a few miles from Kingswood. Arthur Holden's financial situation was in difficulty and the smaller house was unavoidable although in 1905 they returned to the larger Gowan Bank. Emma died in 1904.

Holden developed a successful illustration career, working to illustrate books and creating books with her sister Violet. One book they produced was The House That Jack Built And Other Nursery Rhymes. She also exhibited with the Royal Birmingham Society of Artists. Her work tended to be both pen and ink as well as watercolour. Her work was in the Art Nouveau style.

Holden married Frank Matthews in 1904. He worked with slum children who had been crippled and Holden joined him in his work. Holden was over 90 at her death.
