= Kate Bunce =

19th and 20th-century English artist

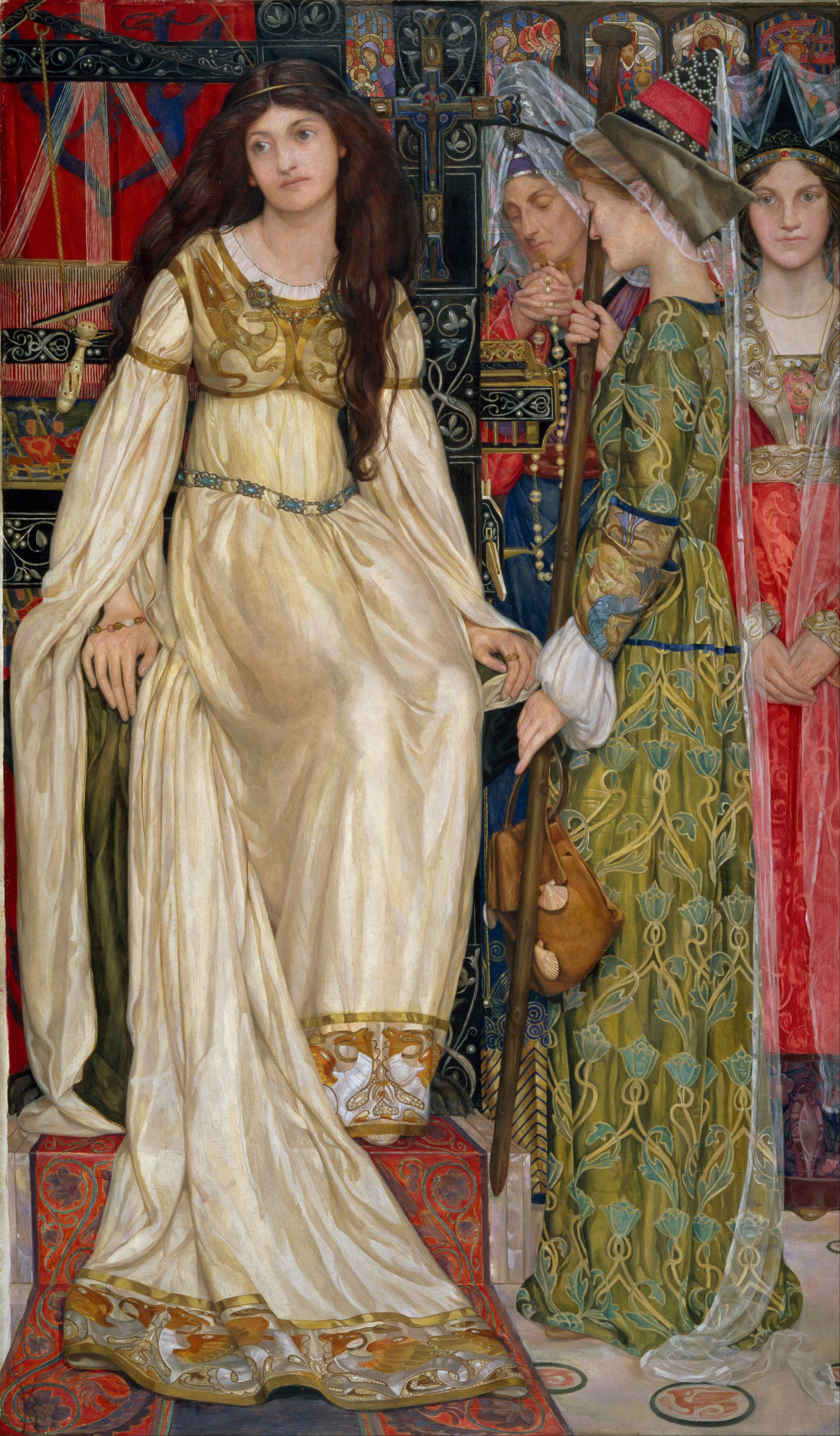
The Keepsake (1898–1901), Tempera on canvas.

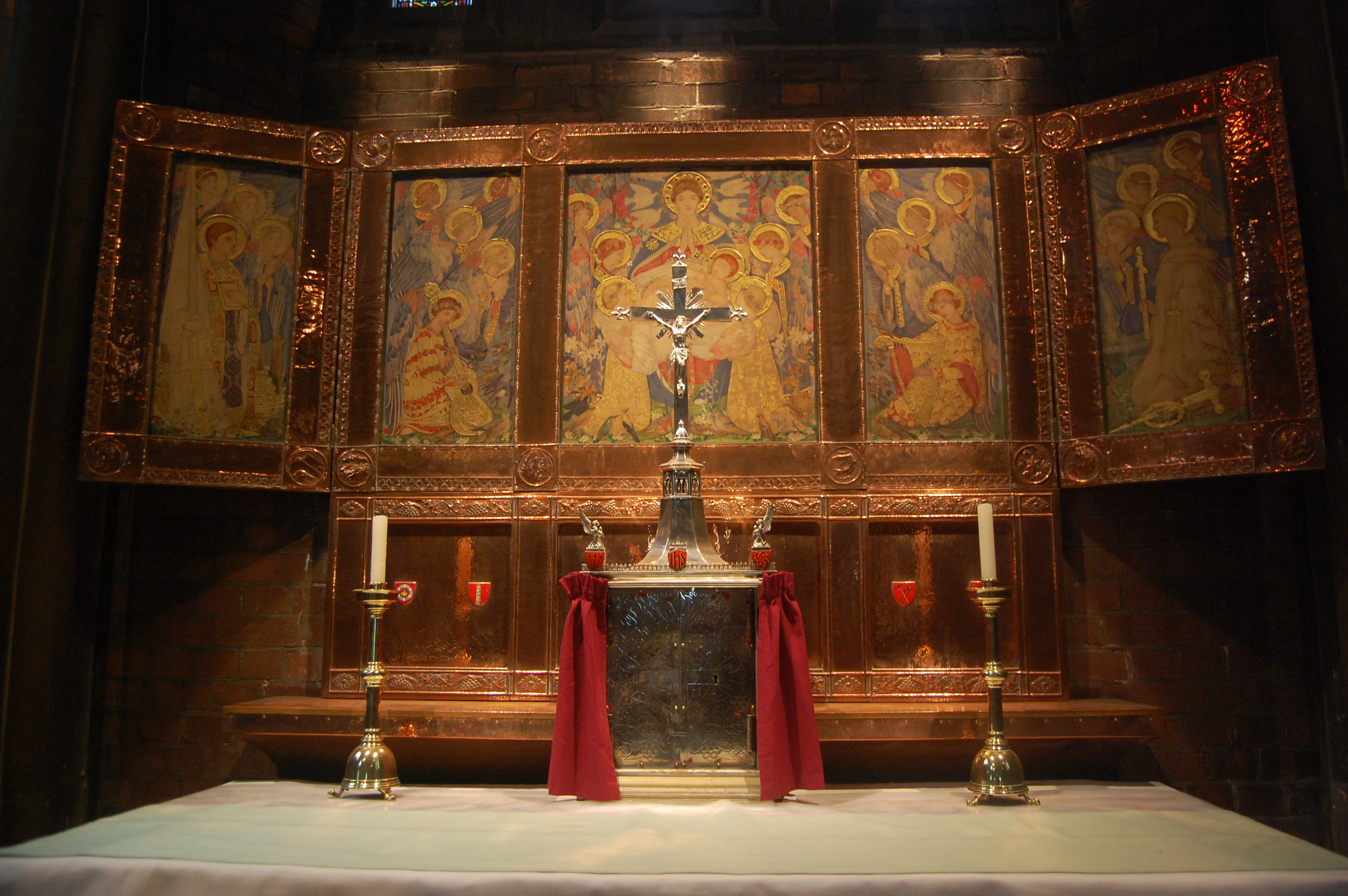
The St Alban reredos, and a 1938 silver tabernacle

Kate Elizabeth Bunce (25 August 1856 – 24 December 1927) was an English painter and poet associated with the Arts and Crafts movement.

The daughter of John Thackray Bunce – a patron of Birmingham Museum & Art Gallery and editor of the Birmingham Post during its Liberal heyday – Bunce was born in Birmingham and educated at home. She studied at the Birmingham School of Art in the 1880s, first exhibiting artworks with the Royal Birmingham Society of Artists in 1874 and with the Royal Academy from 1887. She was elected as an associate of the Royal Birmingham Society of Artists in 1888 and many of her works were displayed in a number of Birmingham churches.

== Career ==
Her earliest known work is The Sitting Room (1887), and in 1893 Bunce was one of the artists invited to contribute murals to hang in Birmingham Town Hall. Her initial style was that of the Birmingham School, where she was a prizewinning student during the 1880s. Her work became increasingly influenced by Burne-Jones, Rossetti, and the Pre-Raphaelites, and was characterised by strong figure drawing and a clear use of colour. Later in her life she painted a series of decorative pieces in churches, often alongside metalwork by her sister Myra Bunce. She exhibited her work across England between the years 1887 and 1912 in London, Manchester, Birmingham, and Liverpool. Her reredos in the church of St Alban's, Bordesley features many species of birds.

== Personal life ==
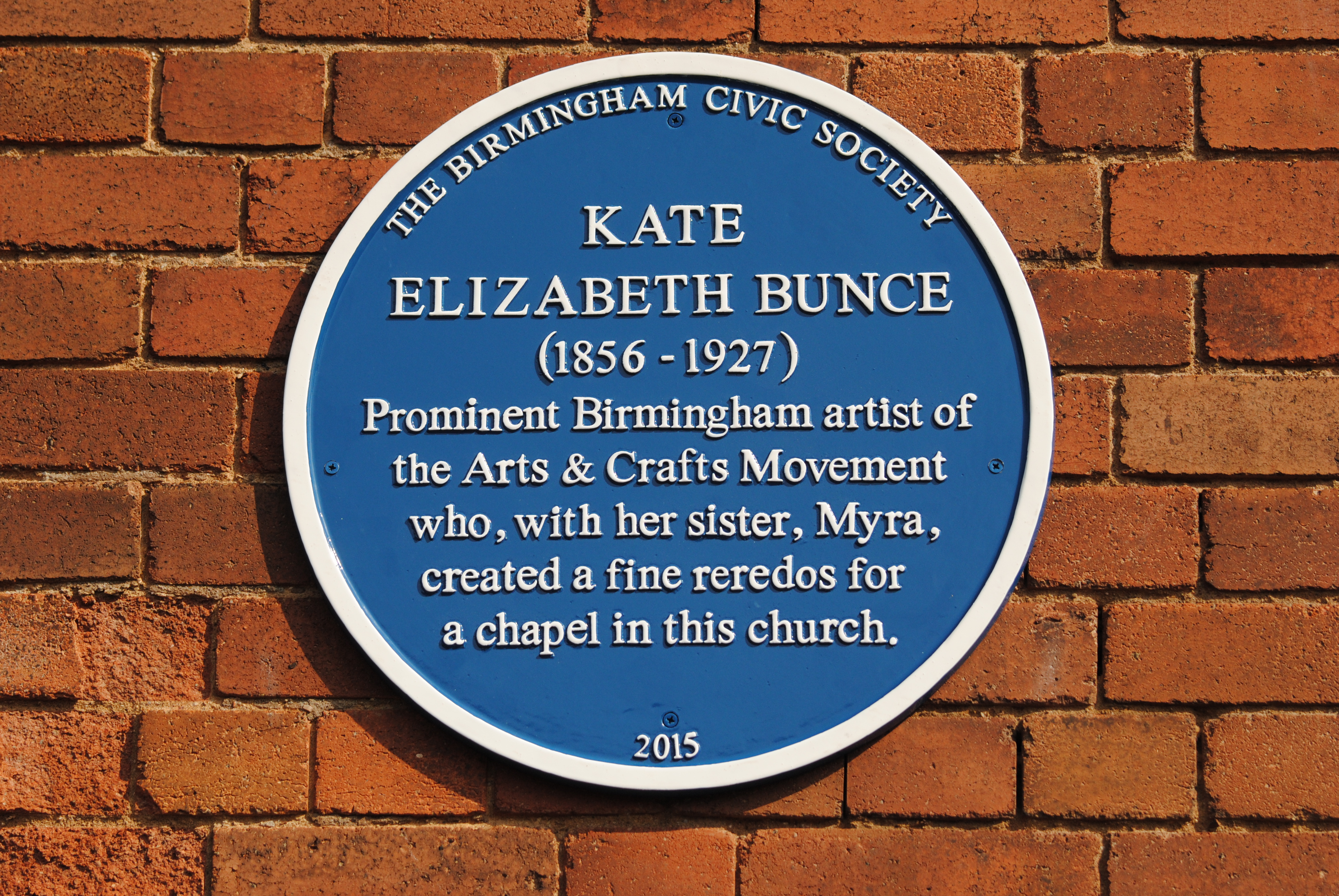
Blue plaque

Bunce lived all of her life in Edgbaston and died unmarried. A Birmingham Civic Society blue plaque in her honour was unveiled at St Alban's church in September 2015, by the Lord Mayor of Birmingham.

== Gallery ==
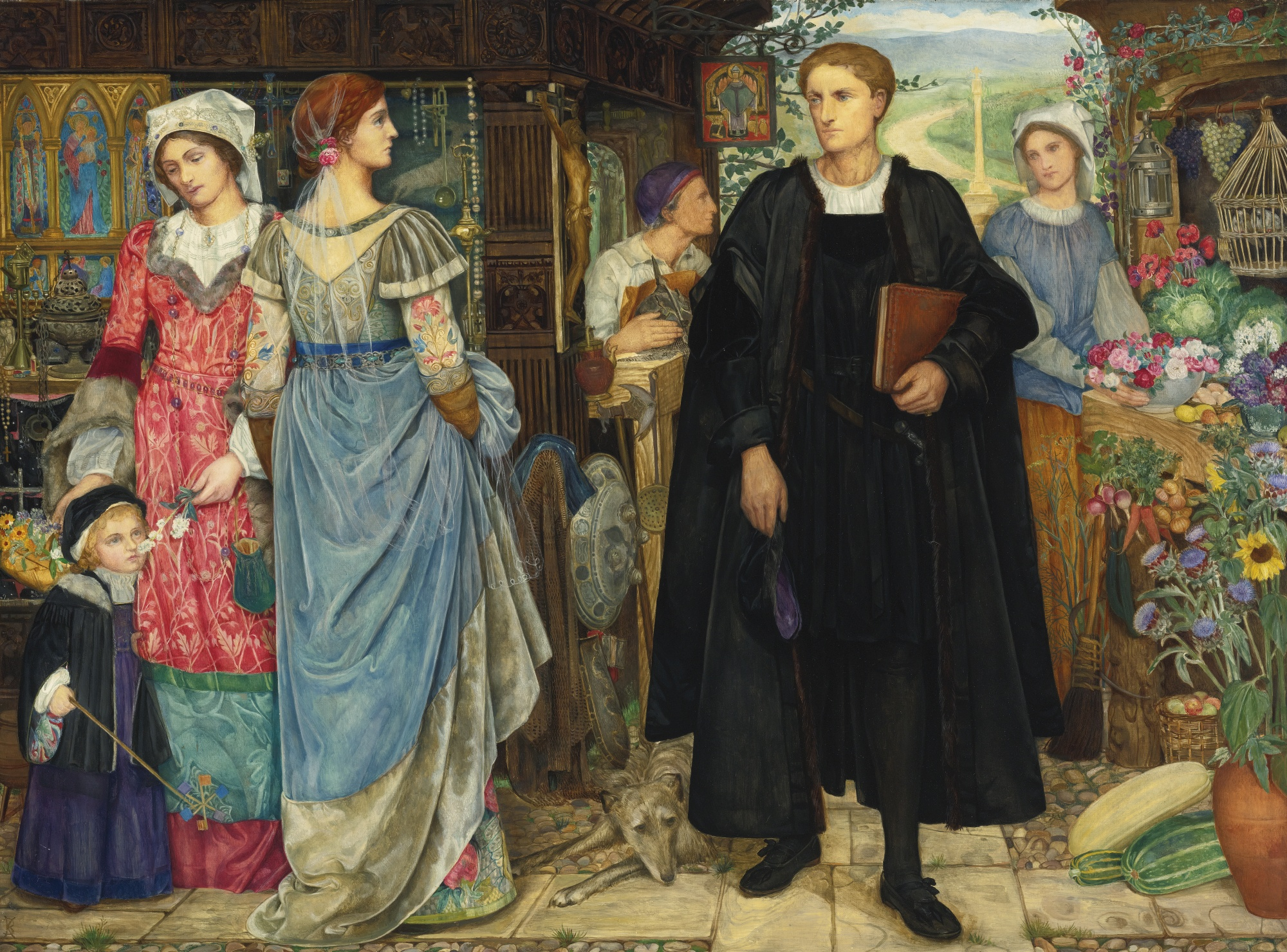
The Chance Meeting

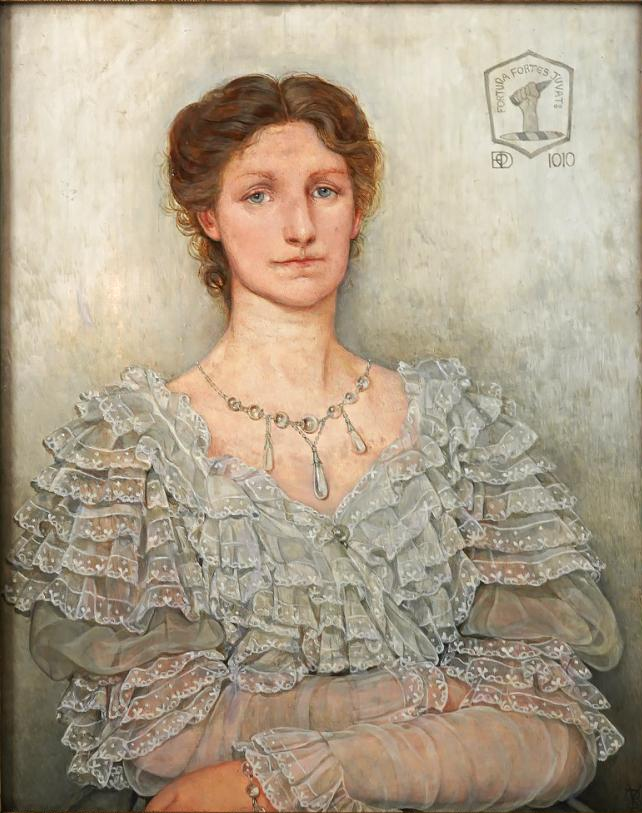
Portrait of Mrs. Macneile Dixon

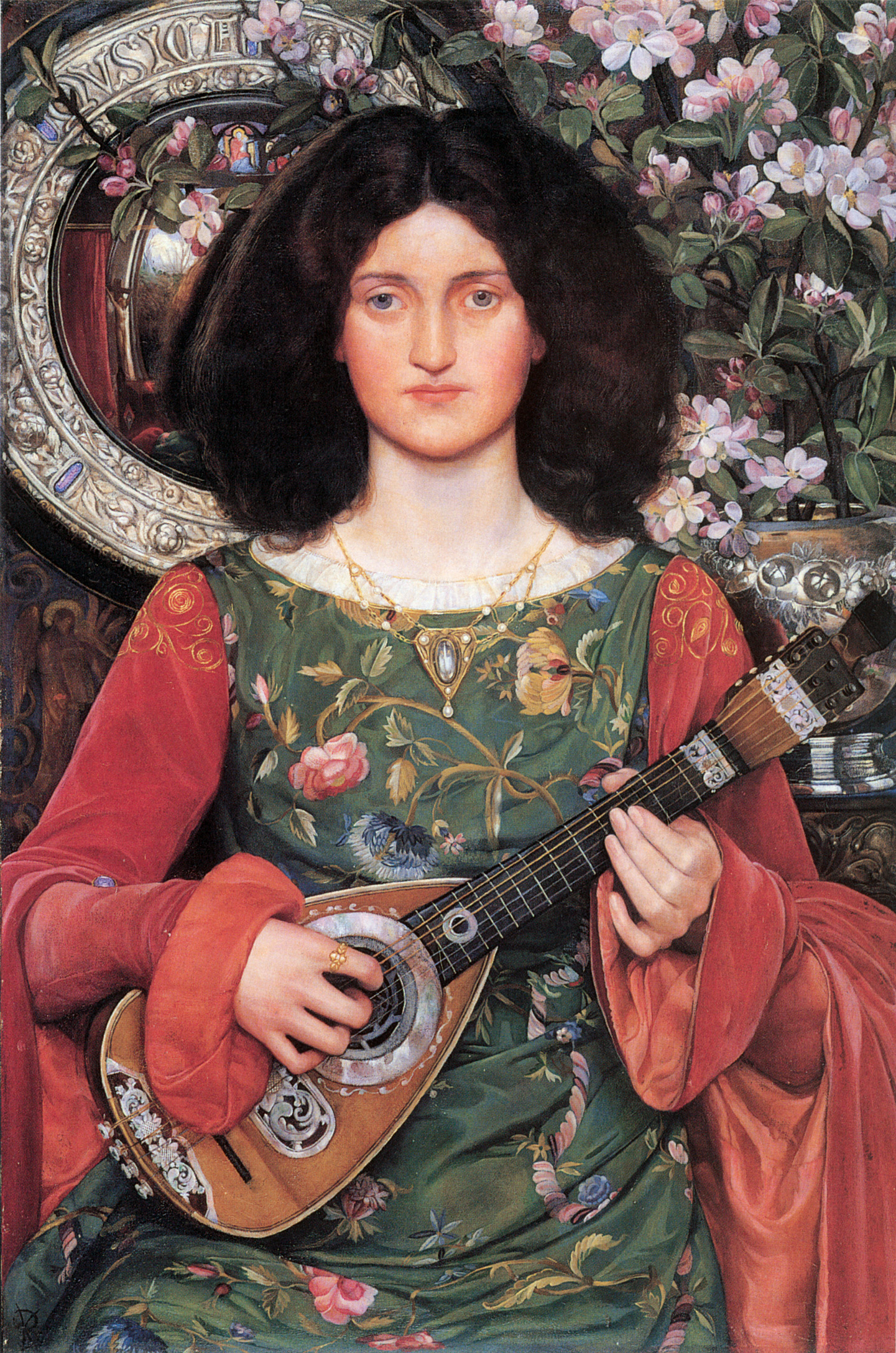
Melody (Musica), circa 1895

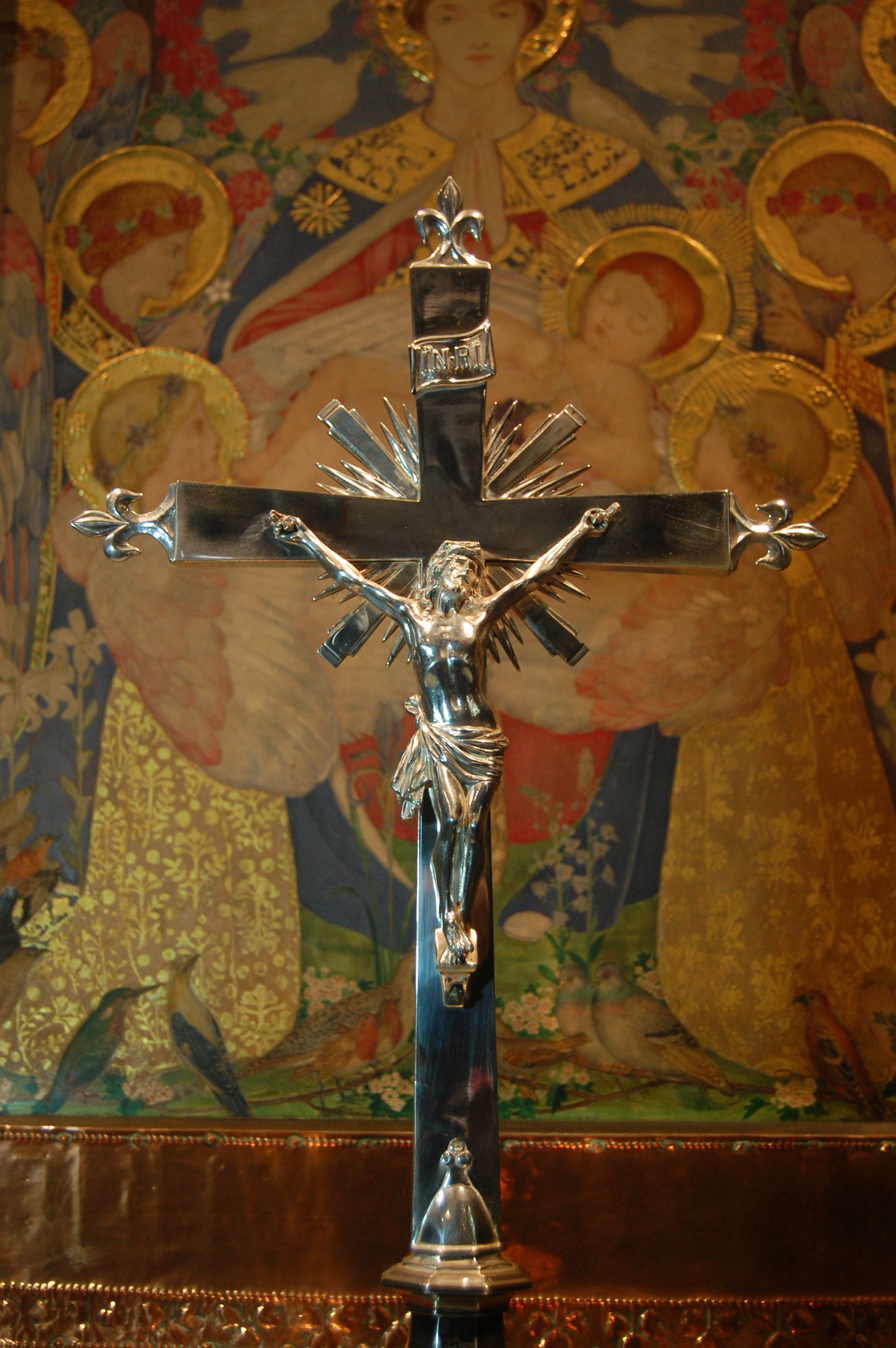
Reredos by Kate Bunce. Copperwork by her sister Myra. St Alban the Martyr, Birmingham, England.

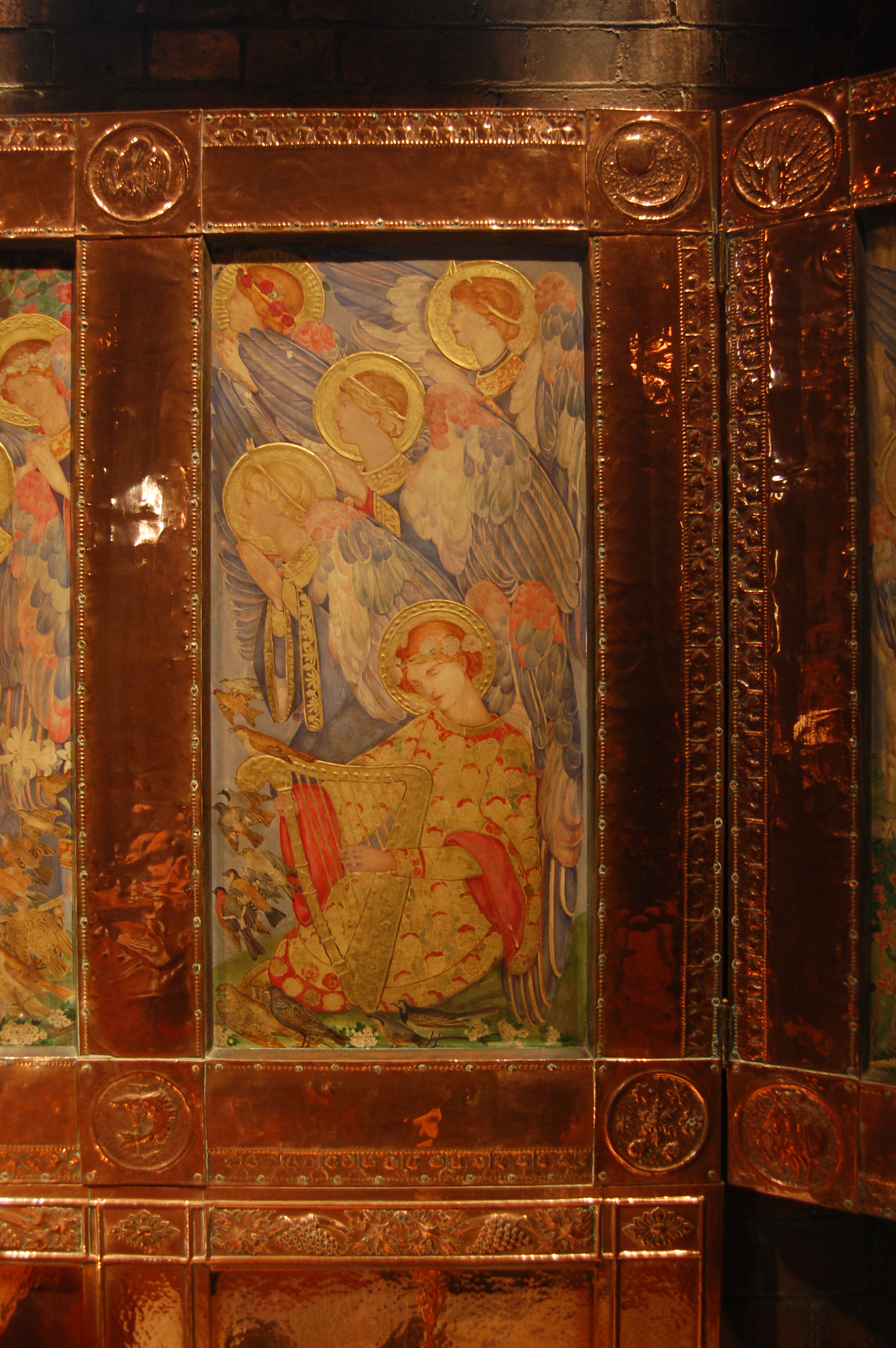
Reredos

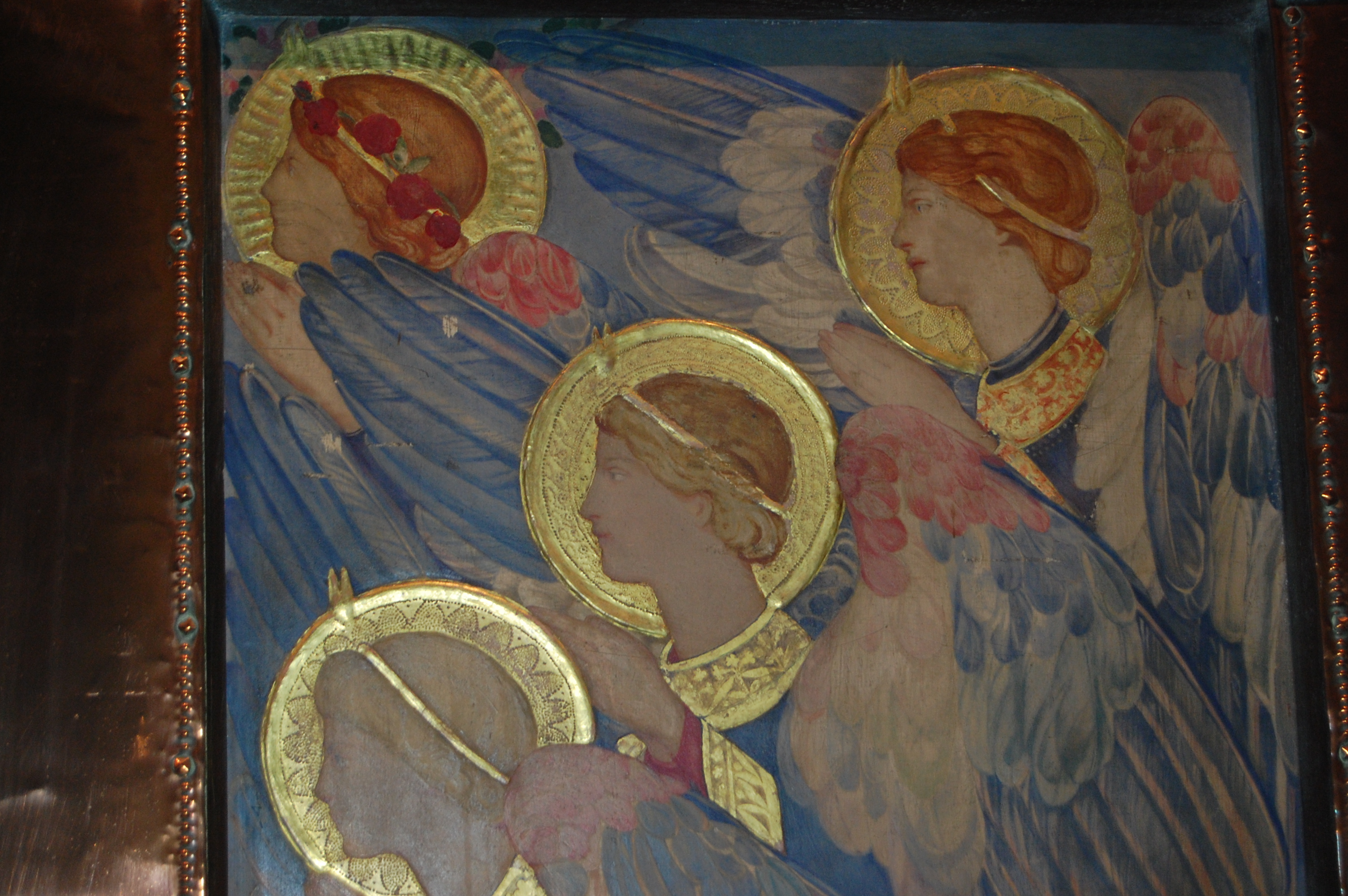
Reredos detail
