= Camp Hill, Birmingham =

Camp Hill
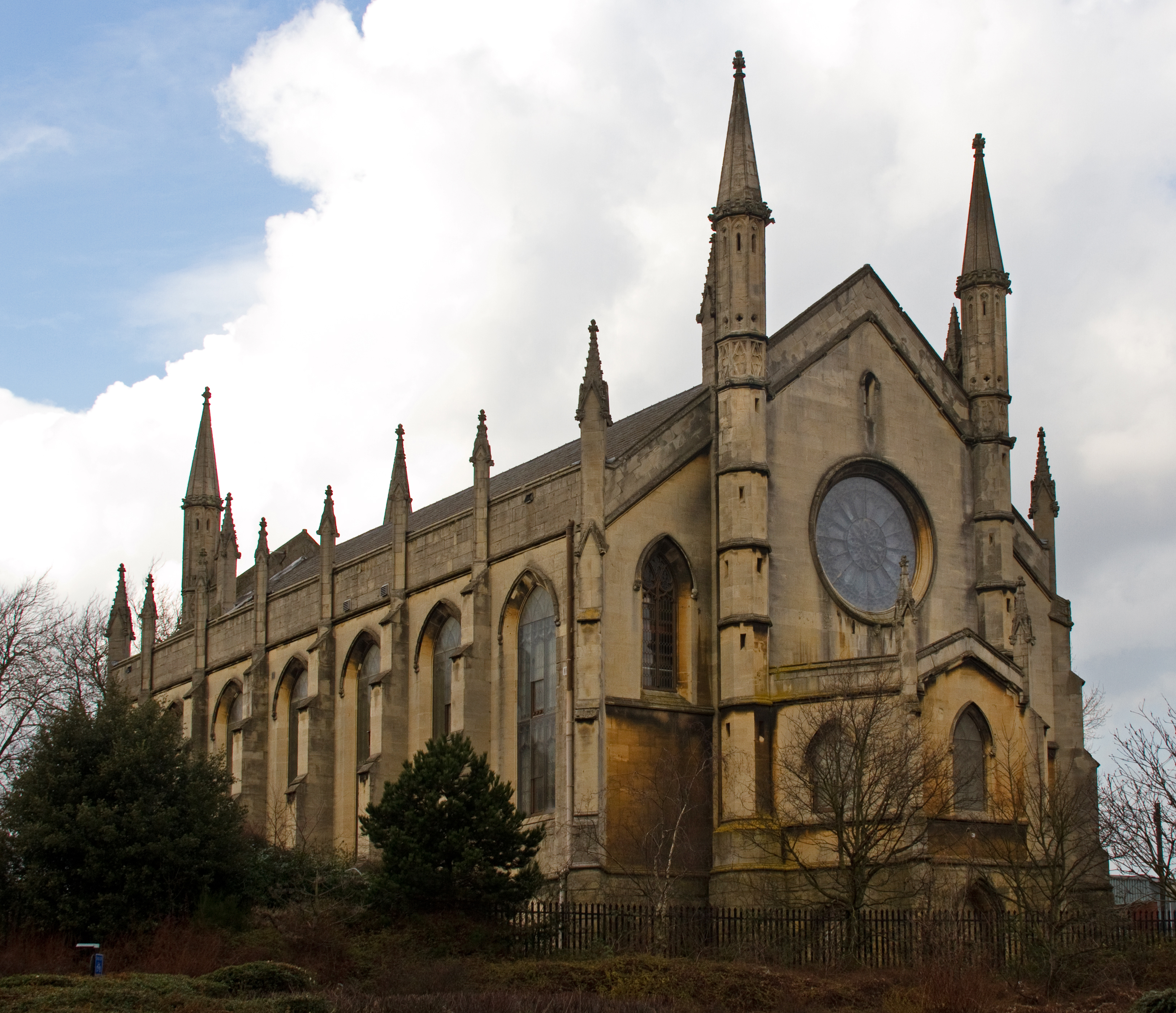
- Church of the Holy Trinity
- Interactive map of Camp Hill
- Coordinates: 52.468°N 1.879°W
- Country: England
- County: West Midlands
- City: Birmingham

Camp Hill is a road and surrounding area in Birmingham, West Midlands, England, 1 mile (2 km) south east of the city centre. Camp Hill is on a ridge above the River Rea plain at 132 metres (433 ft) above sea level. It was first recorded as Kempe Hill in 1511, derived from a family name.

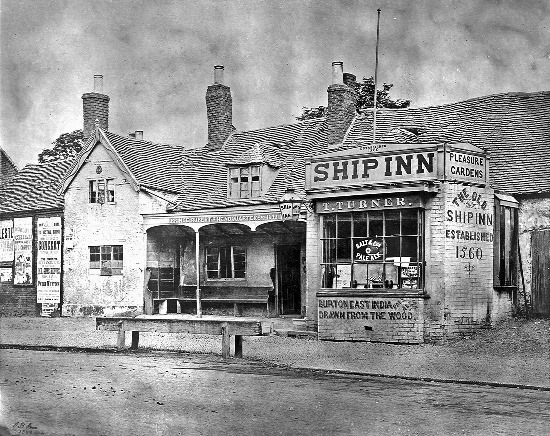
The Ship Inn in the mid-1860s. It was demolished in 1867.

It became known as Camp Hill after Prince Rupert set camp there in 1643, prior to the Battle of Camp Hill, during the English Civil War, reputedly using the Ship Inn as his headquarters.

The area is dominated by a former Commissioners' Church, the Church of the Holy Trinity, designed by Francis Goodwin in decorated perpendicular gothic style and built from Bath stone in 1820–1822. Another notable local building is timber-framed Stratford House, built in 1601 and now a scheduled Ancient Monument and Grade II* Listed. The former King Edward VI Camp Hill Schools building is now a community centre; the schools relocated to Kings Heath in 1956. The grade II listed, Jacobean style, Lench's Trust almshouses on Ravenhurst Street are dated 1849 and were designed by J H Hornblower and Haylock.

Dowding and Mills, a company specialising in motor rewinds was headquartered in Camp Hill for over 100 years from its foundation in 1913. Incorporated in 1919, the company was taken over by Swiss firm Sulzer in 2010 and the Camp Hill premises closed in 2021. Plans have been approved for the site to be cleared and replaced by the Camp Hill Gardens development of a 26 storey apartment tower, lower rise blocks and townhouses set around a private garden. The estimated completion date is 2024.

== Transport ==
The A34 Stratford Road meets Birmingham's Middleway at Camp Hill Circus between Bordesley Middleway and Highgate Middleway.

The Warwick and Birmingham Canal, part of the Grand Union Canal has a flight of six locks running up through Bordesley known as the Camp Hill Locks. In 1931 an Act of Parliament had been passed authorising modernisation of the Braunston-Birmingham section which had been built narrow so the locks could accommodate only a single narrowboat. The section between Napton and Camp Hill Top Lock was rebuilt to take widebeam boats or barges up to 12 feet 6 inches (3.81 m) in beam, or two narrowboats. Camp Hill Locks in Birmingham were not widened since they lead only to further flights of locks not in the ownership of the Grand Union. A new canal basin and warehouse were constructed at Tyseley, above Camp Hill.

The area was formerly served by Camp Hill railway station, which closed in 1941.
