= King Edward VII Memorial =

Public sculpture by Albert Toft

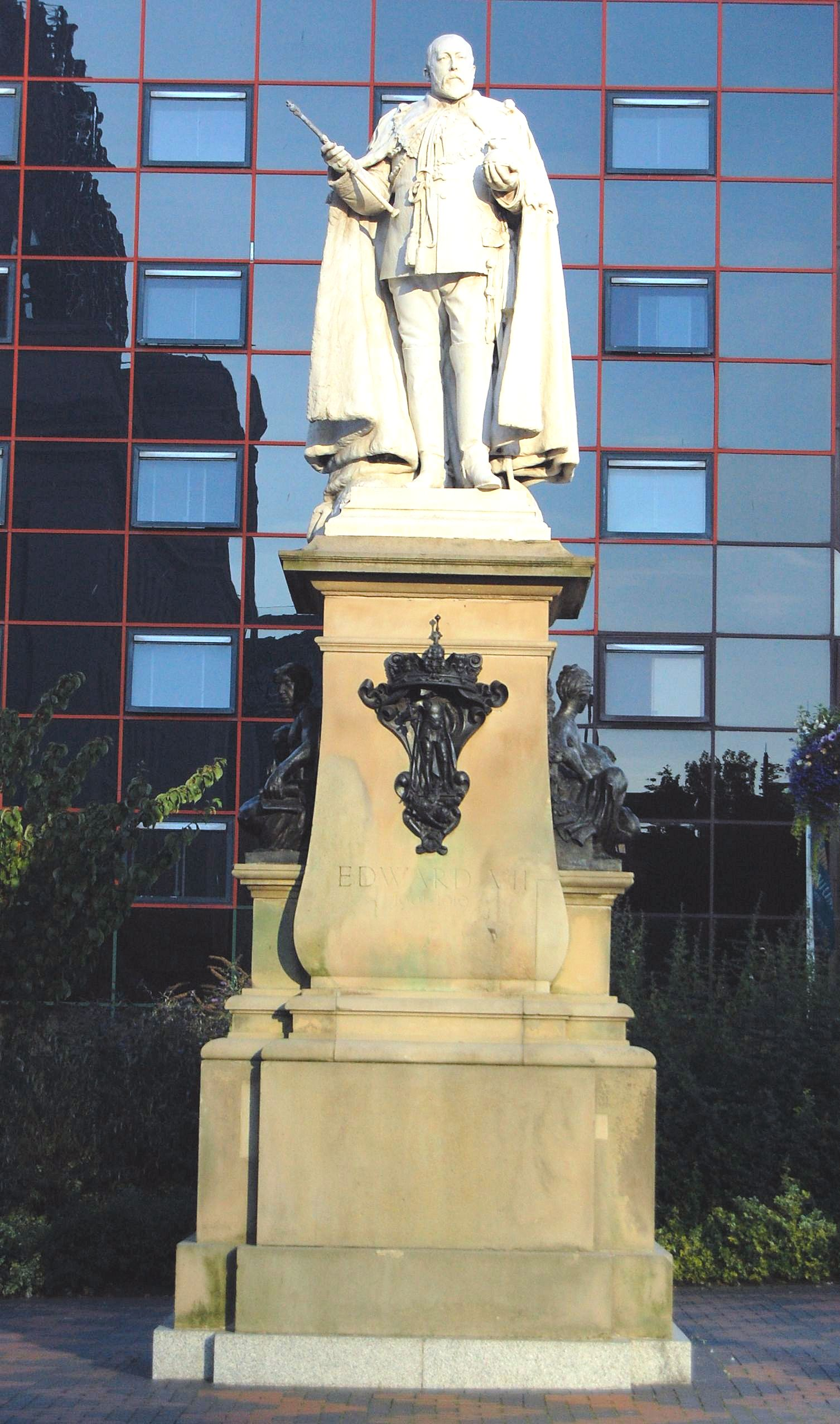
- The statue in 2013, after restoration
- Artist: Albert Toft
- Year: 1913
- Medium: Carrara marble
- Location: Centenary Square; Birmingham, England; 52.479762°N 1.906906°W
- Owner: Birmingham City Council

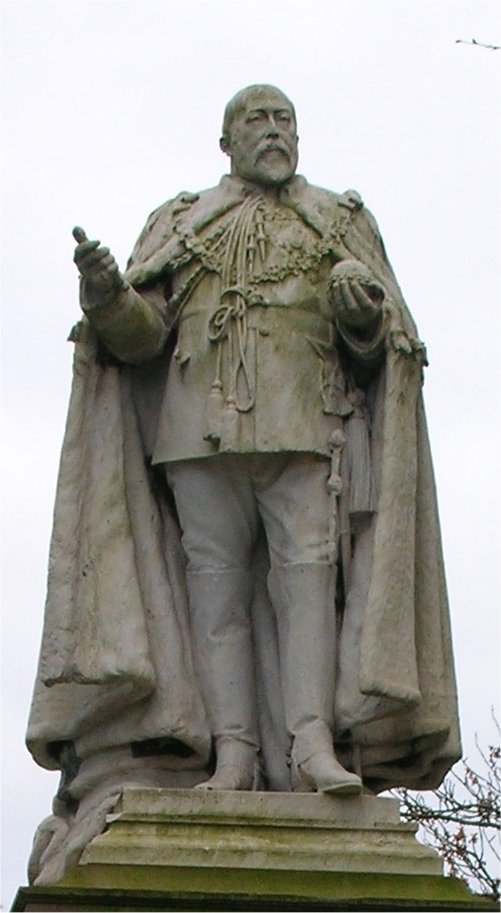
The statue in Highgate Park in 2007, before restoration

The King Edward VII Memorial is a sculpture in memory of King Edward VII, relocated from Highgate Park to Centenary Square, Birmingham, England.

In 1910, the Birmingham Mail launched an appeal to erect a statue to Edward VII in order to commemorate his reign. Over £5,000 were quickly raised, and an area within Birmingham Children's Hospital was allocated for its location (then located on Ladywood Road near Five Ways).

Albert Toft was commissioned to craft the statue, but the project immediately ran into problems. The statue was to be over six feet tall, making it difficult to find a large enough piece of Carrara marble for its construction. This problem was overcome and the project was well underway through 1912.

The statue was unveiled in Victoria Square on St George's Day, 23 April 1913 by Princess Louise, Duchess of Argyll. It stood next to a statue of Queen Victoria. However, soon afterwards these statues were criticized as being of "ill matched designs". The statue of Edward VII was moved to Highgate Park when Victoria Square was remodeled in 1951.

The statue was the subject of theft in the 1970s and 1980s, beginning with the Saint George's lance and then the three bronze groups in 1985 and 1986, none of which have been recovered.

Following successful lobbying by the Victorian Society, Birmingham City Council agreed to restore the statue and re-site it back in the city center. On 12 June 2007, the Society launched an appeal fund to contribute towards the program of works which raised almost £12,000, more than 10% of the final cost of restoration. Work by Cliveden Conservation in Bath began in 2009. A new scepter and orb capital and the three bronzes (representing, respectively, Peace, Education and Progress, and St George slaying the dragon beneath a stylized crown) were re-made, and the monument reassembled on its original plinth. King Edward VII statue was finally placed in its new location outside Baskerville House in Centenary Square in 2013, near other Toft sculptures in the Hall of Memory.
