= Edith Holden =

English artist, writer and art teacher (1871–1920)

Edith Blackwell Holden
- Born: Edith Blackwell Holden; 26 September 1871; Kings Norton, Worcestershire, England
- Died: 16 March 1920 (aged 48); London, England
- Notable work: The Country Diary of an Edwardian Lady (published posthumously in 1977)
- Relatives: Evelyn Holden (sister)

Edith Blackwell Holden (26 September 1871 – 15 March 1920) was an English artist, writer and art teacher. She was influenced by the Arts and Crafts movement and specialised in painting animals and plants. While collecting flowers from a riverbank at Kew Gardens, Holden drowned in the Thames in 1920.

Holden became famous following the posthumous publication of her Nature Notes for 1906, in facsimile form, as the book The Country Diary of an Edwardian Lady in 1977, which was an enormous publishing success. These, and her life story, were later the subject of a television dramatisation.

== Early life ==
Edith Blackwell Holden was born on 26 September 1871 in Kings Norton, (now in Birmingham), Worcestershire. Edith's middle name honoured the physician, Elizabeth Blackwell.

Her mother was Emma Holden (née Wearing), a Spiritualist and Unitarian, and former governess who wrote two religious books, Ursula's Childhood and Beatrice of St Mawse, published by the Society for Promoting Christian Knowledge. Her father, also a Unitarian and Spiritualist, was Arthur Holden, owner of Arthur Holden & Son's Paint Factory in Birmingham, town councillor and charity worker. The Holden family attended the Birmingham Labour Church.

Before the death of Edith's mother Emma in 1904, from breast cancer, the Holden family had become spiritualists. After Emma's death the Holdens held regular spiritualist séances at home in Olton, with the intention of communicating with the spirit of their deceased wife and mother. Holden and her four sisters were instrumental in assisting their father with these communications. Holden's father recorded them in his own diary, which was anonymously published only weeks before his death, as Messages from the Unseen.

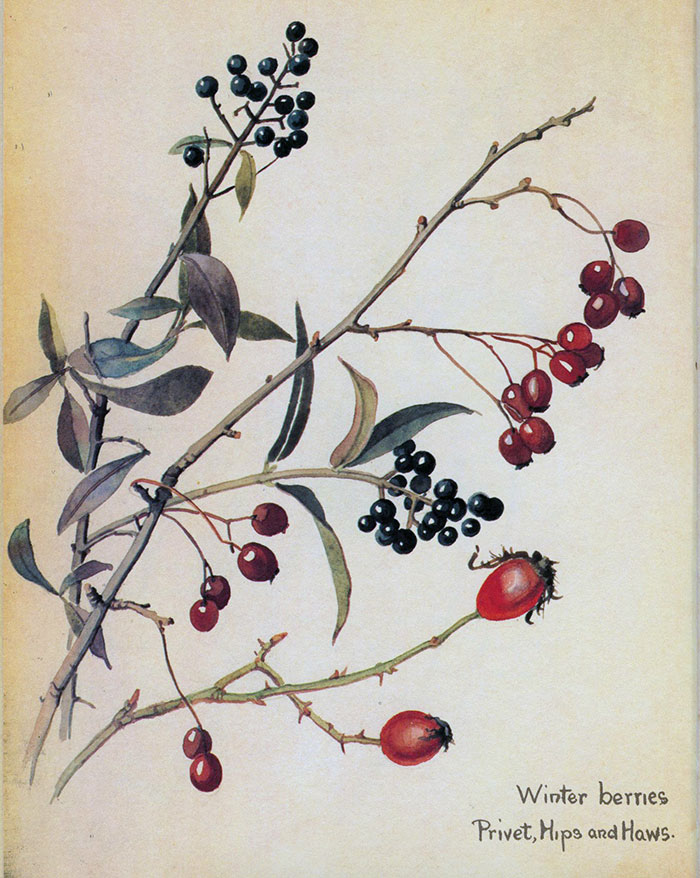
Winter Berries: Privet, Hips and Haws from Edith Holden's Phenology of the English Midlands by Month, 1905-1906

== Early career ==
During the 1906–1909 school years, Holden taught at the Solihull School for Girls. She fashioned her Nature Notes for 1906 as a model for her students' work. Then, like her younger sisters, Holden became an illustrator. She illustrated four volumes, 1907–10, of The Animal's Friend, a magazine of the National Council for Animals' Welfare, and a number of children's books, including The Three Goats Gruff.

Her paintings were often exhibited from 1890–1907 by the Royal Birmingham Society of Artists, and by the Royal Academy of Arts in 1907 and 1917. She was influenced by the Arts and Crafts movement and specialised in painting animals and plants.

== Marriage ==
In 1911 Holden, at the age of thirty-nine, married Ernest Smith, He was a sculptor who was seven years her junior. The couple had no children.

They moved to London, where she became principal assistant to Countess Feodora Gleichen. At the Countess's studio in St James Palace the Smiths associated with leading artists such as Sir George Frampton, sculptor of the statue of Peter Pan in Kensington Gardens, and royal visitors such as King Faisal of Arabia.

Holden continued her career as an illustrator. One of her paintings, entitled Young Bears Playing was exhibited at the Royal Society of Arts in 1917.

== Death ==
On 16 March 1920, Holden was found drowned in a backwater of the River Thames, near Kew Gardens. On the prior Monday morning Edith had complained to Ernest of a headache, but this was not uncommon and the matter had not been dwelt on. The main subject at breakfast had been the impending visit of some friends for Easter, to which Edith was looking forward. Ernest left for the studio at St James's Palace and Edith said that she would probably go down to the river later to see the University crews practicing.

When Ernest returned home that evening, his wife was out, but the table had been laid for the evening meal. Ernest assumed that she was with friends. It was not until the next morning that he learned that her body had been found at six o'clock on the Tuesday morning. The inquest established that she had tried to reach a branch of chestnut buds. The bough was out of reach, and with the aid of her umbrella, Edith had tried to break it off, fallen forward into the river and drowned.

== Legacy ==
Holden was made famous by the posthumous publication, in 1977, of her Nature Notes for 1906 under the title The Country Diary of an Edwardian Lady. She had been living in Gowan Bank, Kineton Green Road, Olton, Solihull in 1905–06 when she recorded the notes. The collection of seasonal observations, poetry, and pictures of birds, plants, and insects - which was never even considered for publication when it was composed - had the nostalgic charm of a vanished world seven decades later. It became a world-wide best seller. The book was adapted into a twelve-part drama, broadcast on ITV in 1984. It starred Pippa Guard as Holden and James Coombes as her husband.

== Bibliography ==
- The Country Diary of an Edwardian Lady. Holt, Rinehart and Winston. 1977. ISBN 978-0030210266.
- The Nature Notes of an Edwardian Lady. Webb & Bower. 1989. ISBN 978-0718133399.

=== Works she illustrated ===
- The Animal's Friend (four volumes, 1907–1910, the magazine of the National Council for Animals' Welfare)
- Daily Bread (1910) by Margaret Gatty
- Woodland Whisperings (1911) by Margaret Rankin
- a series of children's books published by Henry Frowde/Hodder & Stoughton in the 1910s
  - Animals Around Us
  - Birds
  - Beasts and Fishes
  - The Three Goats Gruff
  - Mrs Strang's Annual for Children.
  - The Hedgehog Feast (text by her great-niece Rowena Stot; 1978)

A number of her illustrations have since been used on tie-in products, from books such as Country Diary Recipes to cookware, stationery and ornaments.
