= Newcastle Programme =

The Newcastle Programme was a statement of policies passed by the representatives of the English and Welsh Liberal Associations meeting at the annual conference of the National Liberal Federation (NLF) in Newcastle upon Tyne in 1891. The centrepiece of the Newcastle Programme was the primacy of Irish Home Rule, but associated with it were a raft of other reforms, in particular: taxation of land values; abolition of entail; extension of smallholdings; reform of the Lords; shorter parliaments; district and parish councils; registration reform and abolition of plural voting; local veto on drink sales; employers' liability for workers' accidents and disestablishment of the Church of England in Wales and Scotland.

In the short run it proved a political liability. Liberals won the 1892 United Kingdom general election but failed to enact the Newcastle Programme. They were on the losing side in the 1895 United Kingdom general election and remained out of power until their landslide win in the 1906 United Kingdom general election. The Newcastle Programme was important for two reasons; first, it gave the Liberal party a Radical agenda on which to fight the next general election and second, the detailed 'shopping list' of policies it adopted was innovatory in British politics, setting a precedent for modern political parties. Today ordinary members of all major political parties participate in policy development and the parties present the electorate with a programme or manifesto for government, agreed or endorsed in some way by their members.

== Liberal campaigning ==
The Liberal Party's leading pioneer of organised campaigning had been Joseph Chamberlain. In 1885, he put forward the Radical Programme, unauthorised by the party leadership, as an election manifesto for using the constructive power of the state but Liberal leader William Ewart Gladstone subverted Chamberlain's efforts, co-opting the NLF for mainstream Liberalism. By adopting Home Rule for Ireland as his banner, Gladstone trumped the Radical Programme, driving Chamberlain out of the party to form the Liberal Unionists. In the great schism of 1886 over Home Rule, the NLF deserted Chamberlain to remain loyal to Gladstone.

== Home Rule ==
Between 1886 and 1891, Home Rule dominated Liberal policy debates but two events damaged their Irish allies. In 1887, The Times published letters, implicating Charles Stewart Parnell, the Irish Home Rule party leader, in the Phoenix Park murders of a government minister and a civil servant, although a high-profile government inquiry later discovered the letters to be forgeries. In 1890, the divorce of Katharine O'Shea, which identified Parnell as Mrs O'Shea's lover, split the Irish party and scandalised nonconformist Liberals. The split in the Irish Home Rule party in 1890 weakened the likelihood of a successful Home Rule Bill. At the 1891 meeting of the NLF in Newcastle upon Tyne Gladstone reaffirmed the primacy of Home Rule, but associated it with reforms on the mainland by adopting various proposals of the NLF Council, in particular: land reform; reform of the Lords; shorter parliaments; district and parish councils; registration reform and abolition of plural voting; local veto on drink sales; employers' liability for workers' accidents; Scottish and Welsh disestablishment. The Newcastle programme was to be the solution to these dilemmas, a manifesto for British government.

== National Liberal Federation ==
Each year the National Liberal Federation met for debate in what may be seen as the forerunner of today's political party conferences. The NLF developed a process by which it passed an omnibus resolution incorporating all the policies that had been agreed in debate. In the autumn of 1891, the Federation met in Newcastle upon Tyne. In addition to Home Rule, the policies, which were crowded onto the omnibus, may be divided into three main areas: rural, religious and electoral reform. On 2 October 1891, Gladstone spoke to the NLF and for the first time, a Liberal Party leader had lent support to a programme proposed by the party's grass roots.

However, one historian has argued that the Radicals inside the Liberal Party lacked the leadership to ensure their programme was truly implemented. Michael Bentley suggests that while Gladstone and the Liberal leadership was obliged to listen to the opinion of such a significant section of the party, they were able to slide along without making firm commitments and to pick and choose from the 'rag-bag' of policies that made up the Newcastle Programme, prioritising those they wanted and forgetting those they disliked.

One of Gladstone's biographers also supports this assessment. Roy Jenkins asserts that Gladstone's only real interest now lay in Irish Home Rule, but he allowed John Morley and William Vernon Harcourt to cobble together the Newcastle Programme which he describes as 'a capacious ragbag... weak on theme'. According to Jenkins, Gladstone had neither the time nor energy to oppose the NLF programme and decided to swallow it whole just to ensure the party remained wedded to Home Rule as its principal policy.

Gladstone's endorsement of the Newcastle Programme had one important outcome. A few weeks later, on 25 November, Lord Hartington, the leader of the Liberal Unionist Party, announced that there was no longer any hope of re-union with the Gladstonian Liberals.

== Failure to implement the Newcastle Programme ==
The Liberal Party won the 1892 election, but its majority relied on Irish Nationalist support, and the results were far from the sort of endorsement from the electorate that Gladstone hoped. The new government was unable to enact much of the Newcastle Programme, even those parts that Gladstone approved, because of implacable opposition from the Conservative-dominated House of Lords.

According to one historian of the Liberal Party, the Conservative leader Lord Salisbury justified their rejection of the Liberal measures including, crucially, Home Rule, on the basis that the Liberal victory in 1892 had rested on the votes of 150 electors in eight constituencies collected by offering many different policy bribes. Of the Newcastle Programme, the government's principal achievements were employers' liability, parish councils and William Vernon Harcourt's 1894 budget, which introduced graduated death duties.

Gladstone resigned as prime minister in 1894 and was replaced with Lord Rosebery who poured scorn on the Newcastle Programme as the 'flyblown phylacteries of obsolete policies'. When the government's efforts to bring in temperance reform and Welsh disestablishment also failed, Rosebery's disunited cabinet were almost anxious for an excuse to resign.

The Conservatives won the 1895 general election ushering in ten years of Tory government. The Radical policy inheritance of the Newcastle Programme would have to wait for the reforming governments of Henry Campbell-Bannerman and H. H. Asquith before being cashed in.

== See also ==
- William Harcourt (politician)
- Francis Schnadhorst
