= Texas two-step (disambiguation) =

The Texas two-step or country-western two-step is a dance.

Texas two-step may also refer to:

- Texas two-step bankruptcy, a bankruptcy strategy
- Texas Two Step (lottery), a drawing operated by the Texas Lottery
- Texas caucuses, the second half of a two-step presidential primary system
