= Bill Sinkin =

Chairman of the Board and Founder of Solar San Antonio, Inc.

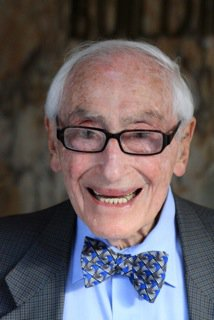
- Bill Sinkin: founder and chairman of Solar San Antonio
- Born: William Rashall Sinkin; May 19, 1913; San Antonio, Texas, U.S.
- Died: February 3, 2014 (aged 100); San Antonio, Texas, U.S.
- Education: Attended University of Texas at Austin, 1933–1934
- Occupations: founder, Solar San Antonio
- Spouse: Fay Bloom (married 1942–2009)
- Children: Lanny Sinkin, Richard Sinkin

William Rashall Sinkin (May 19, 1913 – February 3, 2014) was an American community activist for equality, international cooperation and alternative energy in San Antonio.

== Personal life ==
William Sinkin was born in San Antonio, Texas, on May 19, 1913, the son of Nathan and Bella Rashall Sinkin. While he studied at San Antonio College, he was a Phi Theta Kappa honor society charter member. After he earned a business degree in 1934 from the University of Texas, he began working at his father's wholesale clothing manufacturing company, where he sold khaki pants for $9 a dozen to dry goods stores across Texas. Soon after, he entered banking and became remarkably successful. In 1942, he married Fay Bloom, who was known for her longstanding commitment to public health and water issues. Fay died in 2009. After retiring from banking in 1987, he signed on with UTSA as a financial consultant and opened his own consulting firm, William R. Sinkin and Associates.

== Democratic Caucus ==
Sinkin was a precinct chairman for the Democratic Party, in San Antonio for their “two-step” primary voting process for 66 years. He began in 1942 and ended in 2008.

== Work on inclusion ==
Throughout his life, Sinkin worked to improve the community by opening opportunities for those traditionally denied. In 1945, he co-founded Goodwill of San Antonio in San Antonio to help those with physical and mental challenges find work. He chaired the board of the San Antonio Housing Authority (SAHA) from 1949-1953. He also worked to increase the participation of minorities in local governmental agencies. He hired the first woman executive director of SAHA. When Sinkin bought control of Texas State Bank in the late 1960s, the bank started an aggressive program of minority representation and small business lending. He founded the Urban Coalition of San Antonio in the 1960s, a non-profit research and advocacy organization that works with low-income white communities and communities of color to address community, social, and economic issues. The Coalition works in the areas of education, employment, health, hunger and poverty, welfare reform, immigration, issues of race, technical assistance and capacity building. In 1976, Sinkin led a private delegation of San Antonio Jewish leaders to meet with Mexico's President Echerrveria to discuss Mexican-Jewish relations after Echeverria endorsed a United Nations General Assembly resolution that equated Zionism with racism. The goodwill talks stressed the importance of good relations between the U.S. Jewish community and Mexico to promote economic and cultural ties.

== HemisFair ==
Sinkin's interest in improving the community continued through the 1960s when he undertook a major role in organizing HemisFair. This was the first officially designated international exposition in the Southwestern United States. It celebrated the 250th anniversary of the founding of San Antonio. Its theme was the “Confluence of Civilizations in the Americas,” and it included exhibitions of more than thirty nations. Sinkin served as the first president of San Antonio Fair, Inc., the corporate body for the San Antonio World's Fair. The event took place in 1968, and became a momentous moment in San Antonio’s history. Today, the area surrounding it has been renamed HemisFair Park. For the remainder of his life, Sinkin continued to play an important role in determining the future of this public space, including contributing ideas on public proposals affecting its redevelopment. Despite how busy his schedule was in 1968, he also served on the planning committee for dedicating the Bexar County Hospital, and was Vice Chairman of Bexar County Hospital District.

== Renewable energy ==
Sinkin retired from the bank in 1987 and subsequently focused largely on renewable energy. As a lifelong advocate of alternative energy, he hosted one of San Antonio’s first major solar installations on the rooftop of his bank in the 1980s. He founded Solar San Antonio in 1999, and then launched the Metropolitan Partnership for Energy in 2003, which became Build San Antonio Green in 2008. He instigated San Antonio’s Solar Tour, got the city designated as a Solar America City, and worked to establish a renewable energy center for the state. He helped to get a solar water-heating system installed on the county jail; to launch a sustainable-community restoration of the Pearl Brewery; and encouraged CPS, the largest municipally owned gas-and-electric utility in the country, to launch a solar-roofs incentive program. Sinkin spent most of his later years working with Solar San Antonio, coordinating efforts with his son Lanny Sinkin.

== Awards ==
Sinkin was recognized with numerous awards, including the National Brotherhood Award by the National Conference of Christians and Jews in 1966, and banker of the year by the Small Business Administration and Independent Bankers Association in 1984. William R. Sinkin Eco Centro, community center for environmental sustainability at San Antonio College, was named in his honor.

== Death ==
Bill Sinkin died on February 3, 2014, at the age of 100. He was survived by his two sons, Lanny and Richard Sinkin, three grandchildren, and three great-grandchildren.
