= Caucus =

Meeting of supporters or members of a specific political party or movement

A caucus is a group or meeting of supporters or members of a specific political party or movement. The exact definition varies between different countries and political cultures.

The term originated in the United States, where it can refer to a meeting of members of a political party to nominate candidates, plan policy, etc., in the United States Congress, or other similar representative organs of government. It has spread to certain Commonwealth countries, including Australia, Canada, New Zealand, and South Africa, where it generally refers to a regular meeting of all members of Parliament (MPs) who belong to a parliamentary party: a party caucus may have the ability to elect or dismiss the party's parliamentary leader. The term was used historically in the United Kingdom to refer to the Liberal Party's internal system of management and control.

== Etymology ==
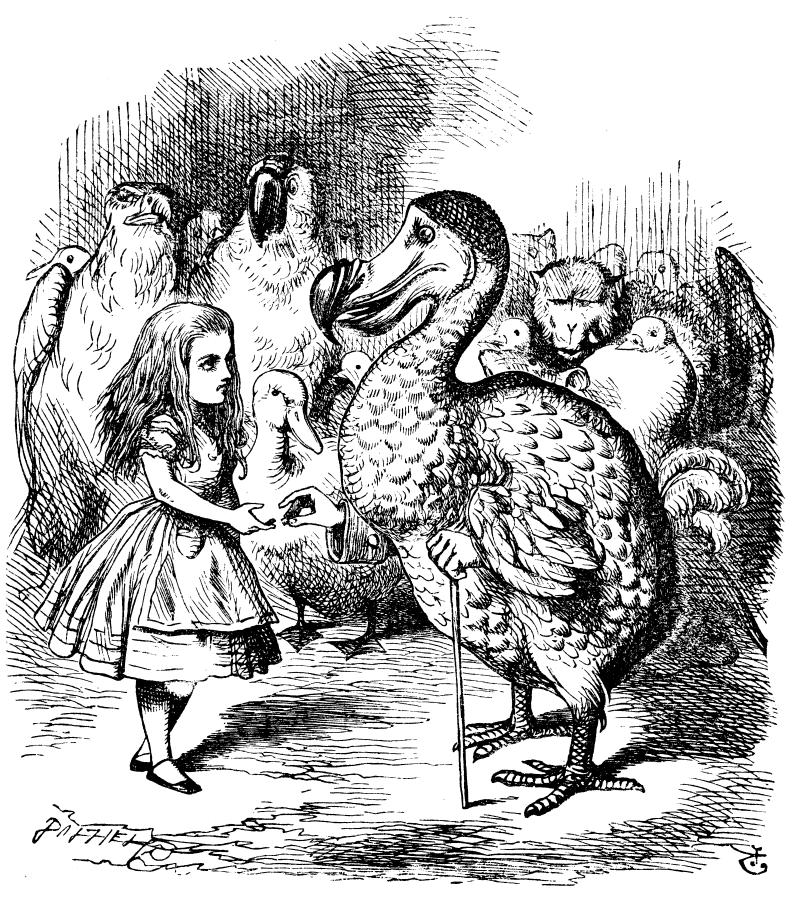
Lewis Carroll mocked the futility of caucuses in "A Caucus-Race and a Long Tale", Chapter 3 of Alice's Adventures in Wonderland (1865): when the "Caucus-race" of running in a circle stops, everyone is declared a winner by the Dodo and Alice is told to hand out prizes to all others, receiving her own thimble as her prize.

The word caucus came into use in the British colonies of North America to describe clubs or private meetings at which political matters were discussed. It is first found in reference to the Caucus Club of Boston, which was established in c. 1719, although the name is not documented until c. 1760. The origins of the word are uncertain, but there are three main theories:

Native American
James Hammond Trumbull suggested to the American Philological Association in 1872 that the word comes from an Algonquian word for "counsel", cau´-cau-as´u. It might also derive from the Algonquian cawaassough, meaning an advisor, talker, or orator. This explanation was favored by Charles Dudley Warner.

Drinking associations
The American Heritage Dictionary suggests that the word possibly derives from medieval Latin caucus, meaning "drinking vessel", such as might have been used for the flip drunk at the Caucus Club (see John Adams quotation below). The appearance of the term coincides with the spreading in England – and therefore also in America – of the inns called cocues because they were places to drink the new cheap liquor called "gin" or "cuckoo liquor", since it was obtained from the distillation of so-called "cuckoo barley"; namely, barley sown very late in the spring and therefore unsuitable for the brewing of beer. That caucuses were places where people drank abundantly is attested by Obadiah Benjamin Franklin Bloomfield in his 1818 autobiography: "Richard had set out hospitably [...] A caucus had been accordingly held by these worthies, and it was resolved nem. con. that they should first make a drunkard of him, and then pluck him, aye, even of the last feather."

Shipbuilding
A third theory is that the word is a corruption of "caulkers" (i.e., persons who apply caulk), in the sense of shipbuilders. This derivation was suggested by John Pickering in 1816 in A Vocabulary; or, Collection of Words and Phrases Which Have Been Supposed to Be Peculiar to the U.S. of America. It was later adopted by Noah Webster and also appears in an article of 1896 on the origins of the caucus – in all cases citing the 1788 passage by William Gordon quoted below (although Gordon only mentions shipbuilding incidentally, and does not imply any direct connection with the caucus). It likewise appears in Appletons' Cyclopædia of American Biography (1888), where it is suggested that the term's roots lay in what is here called the "caulkers' club" of Boston, formed by Samuel Adams Sr. and a group of "sea-captains, shipwrights, and persons otherwise connected with the shipping interest". This entry also discusses Samuel Adams Jr.'s fondness for quoting Greek and Latin "after the pedantic fashion of the time", which might provide a context for a coinage with a Latin suffix.

=== Early usage ===
The Boston Gazette of May 5, 1760, includes an essay commenting:

Whereas it is reported, that certain Persons, of the Modern Air and Complexion, to the Number of Twelve at least, have divers Times of late been known to combine together, and are called by the Name of the New and Grand Corcas, tho' of declared Principles directly opposite to all that have heretofore been known: And whereas it is vehemently suspected, by some, that their Design is nothing less, than totally to overthrow the ancient Constitution of our Town-Meetings, as being popular and mobbish …

The writer goes on to argue that the underhand attempts of this "New and Grand Corcas" to influence voters are in opposition to the more laudable activities of "the old and true Corcas".

A February 1763 entry in the diary of John Adams demonstrates that the word already held its modern connotations of a "smoke-filled room" where candidates for public election were pre-selected in private:

This day learned that the Caucas Clubb meets at certain Times in the Garret of Tom Daws, the Adjutant of the Boston Regiment. He has a large House, and he has a moveable Partition in his Garrett, which he takes down and the whole Clubb meets in one Room. There they smoke tobacco till you cannot see from one End of the Garrett to the other. There they drink Phlip I suppose, and there they choose a Moderator, who puts Questions to the Vote regularly, and Selectman, Assessors, Collectors, Wardens, Fire Wards, and Representatives are Regularly chosen before they are chosen in the Town …

The following month, a writer signing himself "E. J." and claiming to be "a late Member" of the Boston "Corkass", explained in greater detail how the inner circle of the "Petty Corkass" manipulated the business of the broader "Grand Corkass":

At present the heads of this venerable Company meet some weeks before a Town-Meeting, and consult among themselves, appoint town officers, and settle all other affairs that are to be transacted at town meeting; after these few have settled the affairs, they communicate them to the next better sort of their brethren; when they have been properly sounded and instructed, they meet with the heads; these are called the Petty Corkass: Here each recommends his friends, opposes others, juggle and trim, and often have pretty warm disputes; but by compounding and compromising, settle every thing before the Grand Corkass meets; tho' for form sake … a number of warm disputes are prepared, to entertain the lower sort …

William Gordon commented in 1788:

The word caucus, and its derivative caucusing, are often used in Boston […] It seems to mean, a number of persons, whether more or less, met together to consult upon adopting or presenting some scheme of policy, for carrying a favorite point. The word is not of novel invention. More than fifty years ago, Mr. Samuel Adams's father, and twenty others, one or two from the north end of the town, where all the ship business is carried on, used to meet, make a caucus, and lay their plan for introducing certain persons into places of trust and power.

An analogical Latin-type plural "cauci" is occasionally used.

== In the United States ==
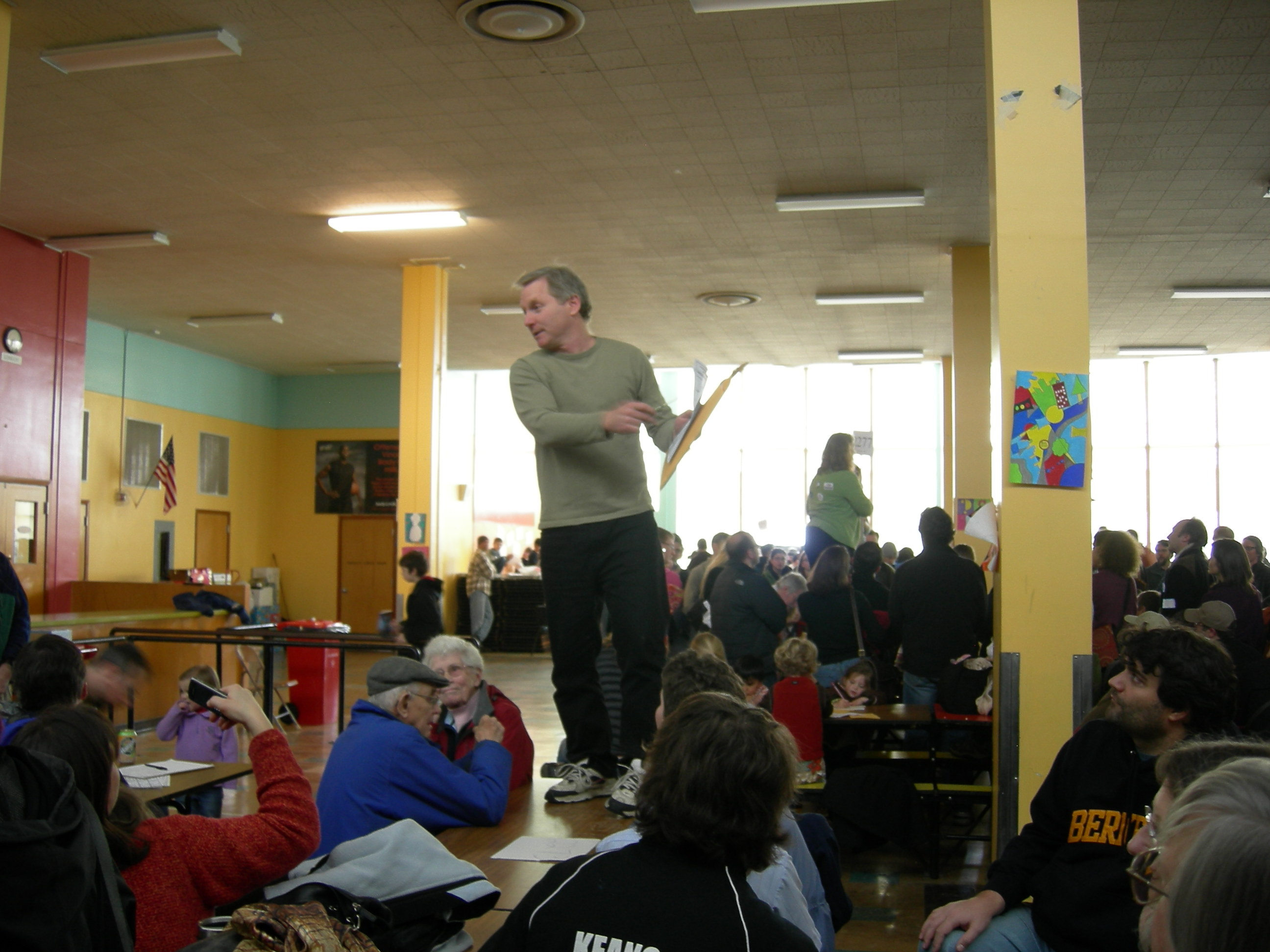
Caucus of Democratic voters from Washington State's 46th Legislative District in a school lunchroom, 2008

In United States politics and government, caucus has several related but distinct meanings. Members of a political party or subgroup may meet to co-ordinate members' actions, choose group policy, or nominate candidates for various offices.

=== Caucuses to select election candidates ===
There is no provision for the role of political parties in the United States Constitution. In the first two presidential elections, the Electoral College handled nominations and elections in 1789 and 1792 which selected George Washington. After that, Congressional party or a state legislature party caucus selected the party's presidential candidates. Nationally, these caucuses were replaced by the party convention starting in 1832 following the lead of the Anti-Masonic Party 1831 convention.

The term caucus is frequently used to discuss the procedures used by some states to select presidential nominees such as the Iowa caucuses, the first of the modern primary presidential election cycle, and the Texas caucuses. Since 1980 such caucuses have become, in the aggregate, an important component of the nomination process.

=== Congressional caucuses ===
Another meaning is a sub grouping of officials with shared affinities or ethnicities who convene, often but not always to advocate, agitate, lobby or to vote collectively, on policy. At the highest level, in Congress and many state legislatures, Democratic and Republican members organize themselves into a caucus (occasionally called a "conference"). There can be smaller caucuses in a legislative body, including those that are multi-partisan or even bicameral. Of the many Congressional caucuses, one of the best-known is the Congressional Black Caucus, a group of African-American members of Congress. Another prominent example is the Congressional Hispanic Caucus, whose members voice and advance issues affecting Hispanics in the United States, including Puerto Rico. In a different vein, the Congressional Internet Caucus is a bi-partisan group of Members who wish to promote the growth and advancement of the Internet. Other congressional caucuses such as the Out of Iraq Caucus, are openly organized tendencies or political factions (within the House Democratic Caucus, in this case), and strive to achieve political goals, similar to a European "platform", but generally organized around a single issue.

== In Commonwealth nations ==
=== Australia, Canada, New Zealand and South Africa ===
The term is also used in certain Commonwealth nations, including Australia, Canada, New Zealand and South Africa. When used in these countries, "caucus" is more usually a collective term for all members of a party sitting in Parliament, otherwise called a parliamentary group, rather than a word for a regular meeting of these members of Parliament. Thus, the Australian Federal Parliamentary Labor Party is commonly called "the Labor Caucus".

The word was used in New Zealand from at least the 1890s, when organized political parties began to emerge: the largest of them, the Liberal Party, used it to refer to its parliamentary members.

In New Zealand, the term is now used by all political parties, but in Australia, it continues to be used only by the Labor Party. For the Australian Liberal, National and Green parties, the usual equivalent term is "party room". In South Africa all parties use the term "caucus". In Canada, "caucus" refers to all members of a particular party in Parliament, including senators, or a provincial legislature. These members elect among themselves a caucus chair who presides over their meetings. This person is an important figure when the party is in opposition, and is an important link between cabinet and the backbench when the party is in government.

In such contexts, a party caucus can be quite powerful, as it can elect or dismiss the party's parliamentary leader. The caucus system is a departure from the Westminster tradition in giving members of the upper house a say in the election of the party leader, who may become head of government. The caucus also determines some matters of policy, parliamentary tactics, and disciplinary measures against disobedient MPs. In some parties, the caucus also has the power to elect MPs to Cabinet when the party is in government. For example, this is traditionally so in the Australian Labor Party and the New Zealand Labour Party.

Events of 1929–1931 in Australia, when the newly elected Labor government of James Scullin was thrown into disarray by the Wall Street crash and the onset of the Great Depression, leading to numerous defections and the government's eventual collapse, have been dubbed the "caucus crisis".

=== United Kingdom ===
==== Historic usage ====
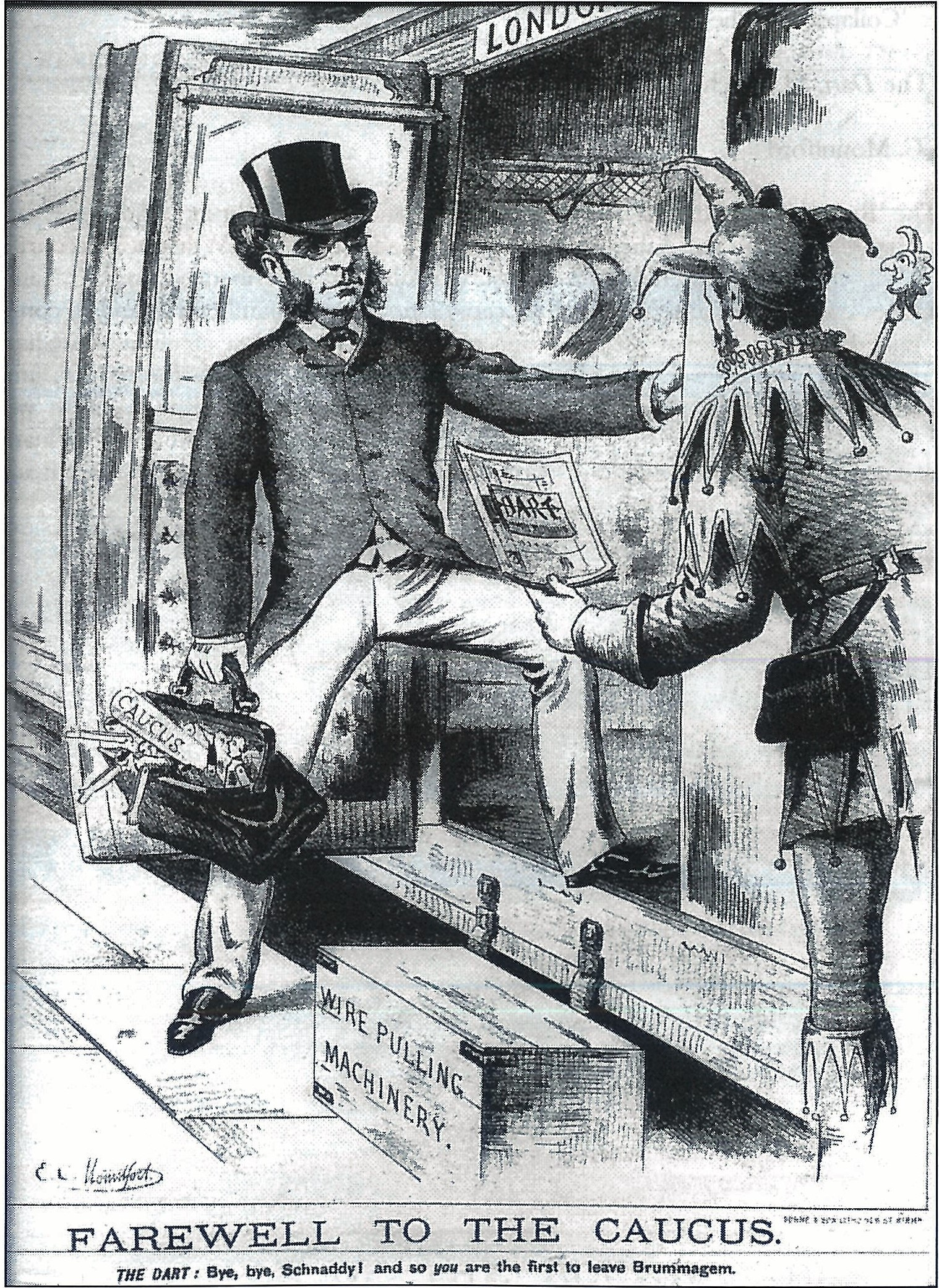
"Farewell to the Caucus": 1886 cartoon of Francis Schnadhorst, Secretary of the UK National Liberal Federation, leaving Birmingham for London following the split in the party over Irish Home Rule. His luggage includes a scroll marked "Caucus", several string puppets, and a box of "wire pulling machinery", all in allusion to his reputation as a backstage political manager.

The word "caucus" had a wide currency in the United Kingdom in the late 19th century, meaning a highly structured system of management and control within a political party, equivalent to a "party machine" in the United States. It was used with specific reference to the structure of the Liberal Party. Originally a pejorative term, used by detractors of the system with overtones of corrupt American practices, the name was soon adopted by the Liberals themselves.

The system had originated at a local level in Birmingham in preparation for the 1868 general election, when, under the 1867 Reform Act, the city had been allocated three parliamentary seats, but each elector had only two votes. In order to spread votes evenly, the secretary of the Birmingham Liberal Association, William Harris (later dubbed the "father of the Caucus") devised a four-tier organizational structure (of ward committees, general committee, executive committee, and management committee) through which Liberal voters in different wards could be instructed in the precise combinations in which to cast their votes. In 1877 the newly formed National Liberal Federation was given a similar structure, on the initiative of Joseph Chamberlain, and again worked out in detail by Harris.

Shortly afterwards the term "caucus" was applied to this system by The Times newspaper, which referred to "the 'caucus' with all its evils", and by the Conservative prime minister, Benjamin Disraeli. In 1880 Queen Victoria, following a meeting with Disraeli, wrote disapprovingly in a private note of "that American system called caucus". The Liberal Caucus was also vilified by socialists and trade unionists, who (prior to the establishment of the Independent Labour Party) sought a route to parliamentary representation through the Liberal Party via the Labour Representation League and the Labour Electoral Association, but found their way barred by the party's management structures.

Moisey Ostrogorsky devoted some nine chapters of his Democracy and the Organization of Political Parties (1902) to discussion of the development and operation of the "Caucus" in this sense.

==== Contemporary usage ====
The word "caucus" is only occasionally encountered in contemporary politics in the British Isles. In contrast to other Anglosphere nations, it is never used for all members of a party in Parliament: the usual term for that concept, both in the UK and Ireland, is "parliamentary party".

When the term is used, it generally refers to a subgroup, faction or pressure group within a political party. For example, in 2019 the One Nation Conservatives and Blue Collar Conservatives were established as factions within the Conservative Party, both being described as "caucuses".

== In organizations ==
In conventions, where the membership from different parts of the organization may gather, each separate group within the organization may meet prior to the convention as a caucus. Each caucus may decide how the group would vote on various issues that may come up at the convention. Unless the votes are made binding, however, each delegate is still free to vote in any fashion.

== In alternative dispute resolution ==
The term caucus is also used in mediation, facilitation and other forms of alternative dispute resolution to describe circumstances in which, rather than meeting at a common table, the disputants retire, separately, to more private settings in order to process information, agree on negotiation strategy, confer privately with counsel or with the mediator, or simply gain "breathing room" after the often emotionally difficult interactions that can occur in the common area where all parties are present. The degree to which caucuses are used can be a key defining element, and often an identifier, of the mediation model being used. For example, "facilitative mediation" tends to discourage the use of caucuses and tries to keep the parties talking at a single table, while "evaluative mediation" may allow parties to separate more often and rely on the mediator to shuttle information and offers back and forth.

== See also ==
- Parliamentary group
- Caucus revolt
