= Sulayman Al-Taji Faruqi =

Palestinian politician

Sheikh Sulayman al-Taji Faruqi (Arabic: سليمان التاجي الفاروقي born in 1882 and died in 1958) was a Palestinian politician, writer and poet often referred to as the Palestinian Al-Maʿarri. He was one of the founders of the "Ottoman National Party" in 1911, and the founder of the "Islamic University" newspaper in 1933. He was known for his strong opposition to the leadership of Hajj Muhammad Amin Al-Husseini.

== Life ==
Sulayman Al-Taji Faruqi
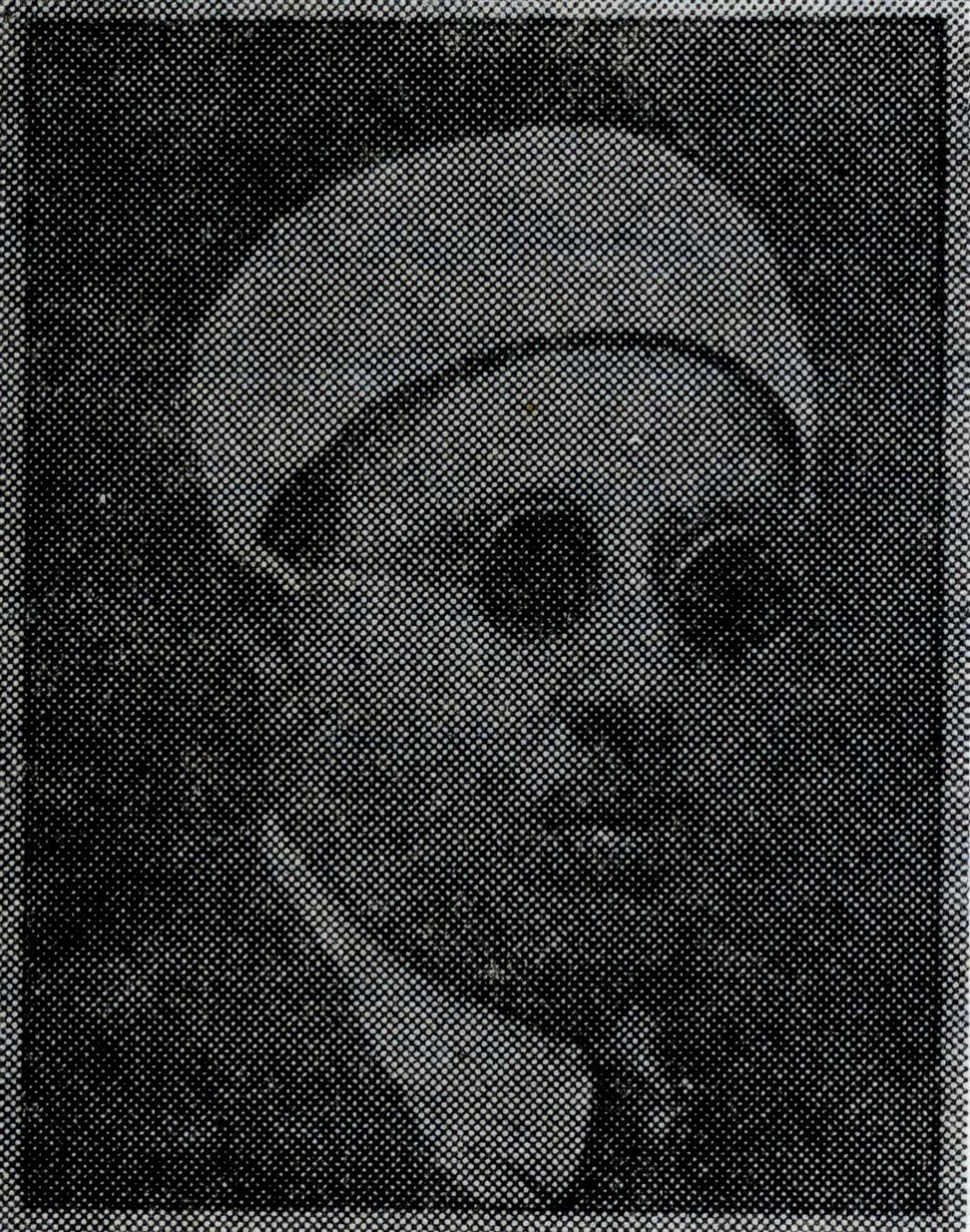
- Born: 1882; Ramla, Palestine
- Died: 1958 (aged 75–76); Jericho, Palestine
- Education: Al-Azhar Mosque
- Occupations: Politician, writer, poet, lawyer

Sulayman Abdul Majeed al-Taji al-Farouqi was born in the city of Ramla, Palestine, in 1882, and his father was Abdul Majeed Al-Taji. Some sources mention that he had a brother named Shukri, a daughter named Rudaynah, and a son named Harith.

He received his primary education at the hands of Sheikh Yusuf al-Khairy, and lost his eyesight at the age of nine. A little later in his life he was sent by his father to Al-Azhar Mosque in Egypt to study Islamic jurisprudence, Arabic and history. There, he was taught by Sheikh Mohammed Abdu, and he managed to "draw [the attention] of Sheikh Mohammed Abdu with his intelligence and understanding". Al-Farouqi spent 9 years at Al-Azhar after which he returned to Palestine. Later, he moved to Istanbul where he obtained a degree in law in 1909. While in Istanbul, he also mastered Ottoman Turkish, French and English. In addition, he used to interpret the Qur'an in the Hagia Sophia Mosque.

After WWI, al-Farouqi returned to Palestine and wrote a number of articles in the "Palestine" newspaper in 1911. One of his articles, entitled "The Danger of Zionism", was the reason behind the censoring of the newspaper. In it he wrote: "You must first be patriotic to your country, and secondly loyal to the Ottomans". Similarly, he had criticized the Ottoman authority for its allowance of Jewish immigration to Palestine.

He founded the "Ottoman National Party" in 1911, but Jamal Pasha deported him to Konya with his brother Shukri. This was due to their opposition to the seizure of agricultural crops which would have been used to supply the army.

Sulayman wrote several poems, including "The First Plane Downfall Over Jaffa," (Arabic: سقوط أول طائرة فوق يافا) which he wrote in 1912 after the first Ottoman plane crashed over the shore of Jaffa.

He later returned to Egypt and joined the French Institute of Law and obtained a doctorate in law in 1919. He returned to Palestine again after the First World War, where he worked as a lawyer.

On May 18, 1933, he published the daily newspaper "The Islamic University", which was concerned with political, scientific and literary topics, as well as an interest in revealing the Zionists' ambitions in Palestine, a country which he defined as "of Palestinian origin, is Islamic and with Eastern tendencies". However, in 1938 the British Mandates revoked and suspended the newspaper's license.

At the end of 1920, Sulayman had published an article calling for the holding of a "Palestinian national conference," and he was one of the participants in the Third Arab Palestinian Conference which was held in Haifa from December 13–19, 1920, and was elected as a member of its Arab Executive Committee. Al-Farouqi also participated in the work of the Fifth Arab Palestinian Conference that was held in Nablus between 20 August and 1 September 1922. He was also a key figure in the opposition movement against the leadership of Hajj Muhammad Amin al-Husseini.

In addition, Sulayman also delivered the speech of the Palestinian delegation that met with the British colonial minister, Leo Amiri, in April 1925, as a representative of the opposition movement when Amiri visited Jerusalem.

In July 1926, Sulayman invited the leaders of Palestine to hold the Seventh Palestinian Arab Conference; a preparatory committee of 40 members was subsequently formed in December 1931 at the King David Hotel in Jerusalem. The purpose of the summit was to confront the General Islamic Conference called for by Hajj Amin al-Husseini.

After the plight of Palestine in 1948, Sulayman immigrated to Jordan to the town of Sweileh and then moved to Zarqa. He finally settled in the city of Jericho, and there he re-issued his newspaper, Islamic University, and explained the reasons of the Nakba. The first issue was released on 15 March 1949, but officials later shut it down. He headed the Amman Conference in October 1948, and then participated in the Jericho Conference in December 1948, in which King Abdullah I bin Al-Hussein was crowned, and he agreed to annex the West Bank of the Jordan River to the Hashemite Kingdom of Jordan.

On 1 September 1951, Sulayman was appointed as a member of the Jordanian Senate.

In his book, "Celebrities and Prison Cells" (Arabic: المشاهير والسجون), Sulayman Bin Saleh Al- Kharashi wrote: "The Palestinian Al-Ma'ari, Sheikh Sulayman al-Taji Faruqi, has written great poems both before and after his exile to Anatolia, and we would like to publish some of them which were promised to be sent to us by a friend".

== Death ==
Sulayman did not stay for long in the Senate, as he died in Jericho in 1958 AD (1378 Hijri) at the age of 76, and was buried in the Bab al-Rahma cemetery east Lion's Gate in Jerusalem.
