= Phi Theta Kappa =

Community college honor society

- ΦΘΚ
- Founded: November 19, 1918; 107 years ago Stephens College
- Type: Honor
- Affiliation: Independent
- Status: Active
- Emphasis: 2-yr schools
- Scope: International
- Pillars: Scholarship, Leadership, Service, Fellowship
- Colors: Blue and Gold
- Flower: White rose
- Patron Greek deity: Athena
- Chapters: 1,244
- Members: 3.5 million+ lifetime
- Headquarters: 1625 Eastover Drive; Jackson, Mississippi 39211; United States
- Website: www.ptk.org

Phi Theta Kappa (ΦΘΚ or PTK) is an honor society for students of associate degree-granting colleges. The society was established in 1918 at Stephens College in Columbia, Missouri. It has more than 4.3 million members in nearly 1,300 chapters in eleven nations. Its headquarters are in Jackson, Mississippi.

== History ==
Kappa Phi Omicron honor society was established in 1910 at Stephens College, a two-year college for women in Columbia, Missouri. After similar honor societies formed in Missouri, the college presidents and students of eight Missouri women's colleges met at Stephens College in the spring of 1918 to create a single honor society—Phi Theta Kappa.

Phi Theta Kappa's mission is to recognize the academic achievement of community college students and to provide opportunities for them to grow as scholars and leaders. Phi Theta Kappa was named after Phi Beta Kappa and modeled after many aspects of the senior college honor society.

Phi Theta Kappa's charter chapters, established in 1918, were Central College, Christian College, Cottey College, Hardin College, Howard Payne College, Lindenwood College, Stephens College, and William Woods College. Each chapter drew out of a hat to determine the order of their Greek letter chapter names. The name Alpha was originally selected by Hardin College. However, when Harden became a baccalaureate-granting institution, the Stephens College was renamed Alpha.

The society continued to expand in Missouri. In 1926, the Kappa chapter was chartered at St. Joseph Junior College, the society's first co-ed chapter. The Mu chapter at Northeast Junior College in Oklahoma was its first chapter outside of Missouri. Kappa Phi Omicron was incorporated in the State of Missouri on April 29, 1920.

On November 19, 1929, Phi Theta Kappa petitioned the American Association of Junior Colleges (now the American Association of Community Colleges) to be recognized as an official national honor society for junior colleges, alongside Phi Rho Pi and others. While not historically accurate, Phi Theta Kappa now celebrates its "Founder's Day" on November 19 each year.

In 1930, the society had sixteen active chapters and five inactive chapters. In 1930, alumni member Margaret James Mosal was elected as the first National President of Phi Theta Kappa, the society's only position not held by students. Mosal oversaw the operations of Phi Theta Kappa from a makeshift office in the back of her husband's hardware store, where she notably stored all of the organization's records in a shoebox. In 1953, she moved the operations of Phi Theta Kappa to her home, underscoring the meager beginnings in the first fifty years of the society

The society's second national president, Rod Risley, first joined Phi Theta Kappa as a student, becoming national president in 1974, and subsequently joined as an employee in 1977. His career culminated in over three decades as executive director and CEO, during which he was recognized in the American Association of Community Colleges Hall of Fame in 2008.

Today, the society's headquarters are in Jackson, Mississippi. It has initiated more than 4.3 million members.

== Symbols ==
The Greek letters Phi Theta Kappa stand the for Greek words phronimon (wisdom), thumos (aspiration), and katharotes (purity). Its hallmarks or pillars are scholarship, leadership, service, fellowship.

Phi Theta Kappa's first membership pin was a blue triangle containing the Greek letters "ΦΘΚ", either plain or surrounded by pearls. Its original pledge pin was a plain sterling silver triangle bearing the Greek letters "ΦΘΚ". Its original colors were green and white. Its flower was the white rose.

The Phi Theta Kappa gold membership key was adopted in 1930 and is its primary symbol. The key is a golden slab with a black enamel band that bears the Greek letters "ΦΘΚ". Behind the band is a oak leaf wreath, denoting stability and strength of character, and a laurel wreath, signifying achievement and success. Above the band is the head of Athena, goddess of wisdom. Below the band are the mystic Greek letters φῶς (phi, omega, and sigma), meaning light, the light of learning, and knowledge.

Phi Theta Kappa's colors are blue for scholarship and gold for purity. Members are referred to as Phi Theta Kappans. Phi Theta Kappa acknowledges that it copied its name after Phi Beta Kappa, and it was modeled after many aspects of the senior college honor society. The society adopted blue and gold, the golden key insignia, and modeled the name directly after Phi Beta Kappa. While similar in name, color scheme, and symbols, no formal relationship between the two societies has ever existed

== Activities ==
Phi Theta Kappa offers transfer scholarships for its members and scholarships to help members complete associate, bachelor's, and master's degrees and to help workforce-bound member pay for certification costs. The society publishes the literary journal Nota Bene, Civic Scholar: Phi Theta Kappa Journal of Undergraduate Research, and Change Makers: Phi Theta Kappa Journal of Student Leadership. PTK also offers an online program to help students develop job skills.

== Membership ==
Membership in Phi Theta Kappa is by invitation only. Students must complete twelve hours of coursework toward an associate degree, six hours toward a one-year certificate, or twelve hours toward a bachelor's degree and have a minimum 3.5 grade point average (GPA) according to the society bylaws. Members are required to pay an initial membership fee.

== Chapters ==
Phi Theta Kappa has nearly 1,300 chapters in eleven nations.

== Notable members ==
Following are some of the notable members of Phi Theta Kappa.

Member	Chapter	Notability	Ref.
Oula A. Alrifai	University of Maryland	Syrian writer	
Hamza Arsbi	Kennedy Lugar Youth Exchange and Study Programs	social entrepreneur	
Carol M. Browner	University of Florida	lawyer, environmentalist, and businesswoman	
Anne Carlsen	University of Minnesota	special educator	
Thomas Matthew Crooks	Community College of Allegheny County	attempted assassin of Donald Trump	
Linda Dominguez	Nassau Community College	Nigerian publisher, public relations officer, and tourism promoter	
Christopher G. Donovan	Capitol Community College	politician	
Sylvia Earle	St. Petersburg College	oceanographer, explorer, and diver	
Evan Edinger	Salem Community College	YouTuber	
Mike Fasano		Florida House of Representatives and Florida Senate	
Alexander Gamelin	Michigan State University	ice dancer	
Alberto Gutman	University of Miami	Florida House of Representatives and Florida Senate	
Fred Haise	Mississippi Gulf Coast Community College	NASA astronaut	
Lars Hafner		Florida House of Representatives	
Rich Karlgaard	Stanford University	journalist and author	
Jeane Kirkpatrick	Stephens College	diplomat and political scientist	
Jim Lehrer	Victoria College	journalist, novelist, screenwriter, and playwright	
Carolyne Mas	Cochise College	singer-songwriter and performer	
Doug Mastriano	Mercer County Community College	politician	
Wes Moore	Valley Forge Military Academy and College	politician, businessman, author, and veteran	
Francine Irving Neff	University of New Mexico	35th treasurer of the United States	
Mirta Ojito	Florida Atlantic University	author and journalist	
Modupe Ozolua	Southwestern College	Lebanese-Nigerian-American philanthropist and entrepreneur	
Jessie M. Parker		Iowa superintendent of public instruction	
Ross Perot	Texarkana College	businessman, politician, and philanthropist	
Roberto Ramirez		New York State Assembly	
William L. Roper	University of Alabama	physician and former director of the Centers for Disease Control and Prevention (CDC)	
Walter Rundell Jr.	Lee College	author, academic, and historian	
Venetta Seals	Tyler Junior College	politician and businesswoman	
Gerald Steichen	Oklahoma City University	music conductor, pianist, and stage actor	
Dan Stoenescu	College of Alameda	Romanian diplomat, political scientist, and journalist	
Bill Sinkin	San Antonio College	community activist and founder/chairman of Solar San Antonio	
Sela Ward	Meridian Community College	actress	
Steven Whitehurst	South Suburban College	author, poet, and educator	
Trisha Yearwood	Young Harris College	singer and author	

== Controversies and member misconduct ==
In 2015, national PTK president Rod Risley took a paid leave of absence following claims of sexual harassment, intimidation, and unprofessional behavior from two former student international officers. These allegations prompted the Phi Theta Kappa board of directors to initiate an investigation. Risley announced his retirement, leading to the termination of the inquiry and his receipt of a multi-million dollar retirement package.

In February 2024, Robin Lowe, a former advisor for the PTK chapter at Itawamba Community College, was charged with embezzlement of public funds meant to benefit the PTK chapter. Lowe was the chapter advisor for Phi Theta Kappa for fifteen years, from 2008 to May 2023.

In April 2024, Phi Theta Kappa entered into two lawsuits over false advertising, attempted monopoly, and trade dress. Honor Society sued PTK, claiming it misrepresents its membership criteria and potentially deceives students into joining under false pretenses, by falsely asserting that it is limited to the top ten percent of students. PTK filed a lawsuit against the Honor Society, alleging trademark infringement and the use of similar visual elements and marketing materials, namely blue and gold colors, gold stoles, and the use of wreaths.

In 2025, PTK sought an injunction against Toni Marek, a former employee who wrote a book critical of the organization. The district court of Victoria County granted a temporary restraining order preventing publication of the book on March 26, 2025.
