= Walter Rundell Jr. =

American author and academic (1928–1982)

- Born: November 2, 1928; Austin, Texas, US
- Died: October 25, 1982 (aged 53); University Park, Maryland, US
- Occupation: Historian
- Known for: Western American History

Academic background
- Education: University of Texas at Austin (BA); Georgetown University (MA, PhD)

Walter Rundell Jr. (November 2, 1928 – October 25, 1982) was an American author, academic, and historian who was distinguished in the field of Western American history.

== Background ==
Rundell was born in Austin, Texas, the son of Olive (née Spillar) and Walter Rundell. He grew up in Baytown, Texas, where he went to public schools. He attended to Lee Junior College (now Lee College) in Baytown, Texas, where his father taught and was a dean. At Lee College, he was editor of The Lantern, the student newspaper, a member of the Phi Theta Kappa honor society, and received its Outstanding Student Award when he graduated in 1948. Then, he attended the University of Texas at Austin, graduating with honors in 1951 with a B.A. in music history, a B.J. in journalism, and a minor in history.

He loved choral singing and wanted to become a music critic. However, he first completed the required military service and was assigned to the U.S. Army Finance Corp as a historian with the Office of the Chief of Finance in Washington, D.C. While in the Army, he began working on a graduate degree in history at Georgetown University. He received an M.A. in 1955 and a Ph.D. in 1957. His dissertation was about the U.S. Army's management of money during World War II.

== Career ==
After leaving the military in 1957, Rundell taught at Del Mar College for one year. Next, he taught at the Texas Women's University for three years. While there, he published two books on the American west. From 1961 to 1964, he was the assistant executive secretary with the American Historical Association in Washington, D.C. He left that position to become the director of the National Archives' survey on the Use of Original Sources in Graduate History Training. This two-year long position included conducting 600 interviews and traveling across the country to various institutions.

Next, Rundell became a professor of graduate history at the University of Oklahoma. Two years later, he moved to the Iowa State University where he served as chair of the history department. At Iowa State, he had to fight to get recognition for the department and his research. In the spring of 1971, he accepted the position of chair of the department of history at the University of Maryland which was a step up because it had a Ph.D. program. He served in this capacity until 1976. He also taught at American University, Columbia University, and Emory University,.

Rundell was a "prolific and productive scholar." He conducted research on a variety of topics, including archival holdings, arts of the American West, biography, military finance, research methods, teaching history, and western oil fields.

=== Books ===
Rendell published five books and wrote more than fifteen pamphlets and short books, and more than forty articles. When he died, Rendell was writing a biography of American historian Walter Prescott Webb. He published books are:

- Black Market Money: The Collapse of U.S. Military Currency Control in World War II (Louisiana State University Press,1964)
- In Pursuit of American History: Research and Training in the United States (University of Oklahoma Press, 1970)
- Early Texas Oil: A Photographic History 1866–1936 (Texas A&M Press, 1977)
- Military Money: A Fiscal History of the U.S. Army Overseas in World War II (Texas A&M Press, 1980)
- Oil in West Texas and New Mexico: A Pictorial History of the Permian Basin (Texas A&M Press,1982)

== Professional affiliations ==
In 1961, Rendell was a founding member of the Western History Association, being described as "the James Madison of the group, charged with preparing the infant association's constitution and bylaws." He was also a member of the American Historical Association, the Cosmos Club, the Organization of American Historians, the Potomac Corral of the Westerners, the Society of American Archivists, and the Southern Historical Association.

Rundell was president of the Society of American Archivists from 1977 to 1978. In 1982, three days before his death, he became president of the Western History Association.

== Awards and honors ==
- Rundell won the Waldo G. Leland Prize in 1971 for his book, In Pursuit of American History. He received an Excellence in Teaching Award from the University of Maryland.
- His writings and books are housed at Blumberg Memorial Library of Texas Lutheran College as the Walter Rundell Jr. Special Collection.
- The Western History Association created the Walter Rundell Graduate Student Award in recognition of his "commitment to graduate education in the field of Western History." The award is given to doctoral candidates whose dissertation subject on the North American West.
- He was included in Contemporary Authors, The Dictionary of International Biography, the Directory of American Scholars, Whose Who of American Education, and Whose Who of the South and Southwest.

== Personal ==
Rundell married Deanna Alyce Boyd on June 12, 1959, in Lewisville, Texas. She was a graduate of Texas Women's University where Rundell was teaching. They had three children—Jennifer, David, and Shelley.

Rundell was a member of First United Methodist Church in Hyattsville, Maryland. Although he left music for history, he never lost his love of it. He joined the National Cathedral Choral Society, the University of Maryland chorus, and the choir of First United Methodist Church.

He died of a heart attack in 1982 at his home in University Park, Maryland.
