= Arthur Brampton =

Arthur Brampton

Arthur Brampton (1864–1955) was a British Liberal Party politician.

Brampton studied at King Edward's School, Birmingham and Bishop Vesey's Grammar School, before joining the family business, F. Brampton and Sons, which was soon renamed Brampton Brothers Ltd. By the 1900s, Brampton was joint managing director.

Brampton travelled around Europe extensively, setting up business relationships, and also served as a director of the Birmingham Gazette. He served as president of the Birmingham Liberal Association for almost twenty years, while from 1920 to 1931 he was the chairman of the National Liberal Federation, then from 1930 to 1933 he served as its president.

In 1943, Brampton retired as managing director of what had become Renold Chains, after a series of mergers.

Party political offices
Preceded by George Lunn	Chairman of the National Liberal Federation; 1920–1931	Succeeded by Ramsay Muir
Preceded by Charles Hobhouse	President of the National Liberal Federation; 1930–1933	Succeeded by Ramsay Muir
