= National Liberal Federation =

Organization of the British Liberal Party, 1877–1936

The National Liberal Federation (1877–1936) was the union of all English and Welsh (but not Scottish) Liberal Associations. It held an annual conference which was regarded as being representative of the opinion of the party's rank and file and was broadly the equivalent of a present-day party conference.

== Foundation ==
The inaugural conference of the National Liberal Federation (NLF) was held in Bingley Hall, Birmingham, on 31 May 1877, with the objective of promoting Liberalism, encouraging the formation of new associations and the strengthening and democratising of existing local Liberal parties. The conference was chaired by Joseph Chamberlain and addressed by Liberal leader William Ewart Gladstone. New associations quickly formed throughout the country and affiliated to the NLF which was a coordinating body rather than one which operated a central control.

== Purpose ==
The task of the NLF was "to form new Liberal Associations based on popular representation". While the NLF always insisted the policies recommended by the members at its conferences were never intended to be binding on the Liberal leadership, it was obvious that the resolutions passed were a strong indication of thinking and feeling in the mass party which the leadership ignored at its peril. For example, in 1914 the NLF came out in support of women's suffrage, and H. H. Asquith (who was personally opposed to the measure) decided it should receive government support.

== Birmingham ==
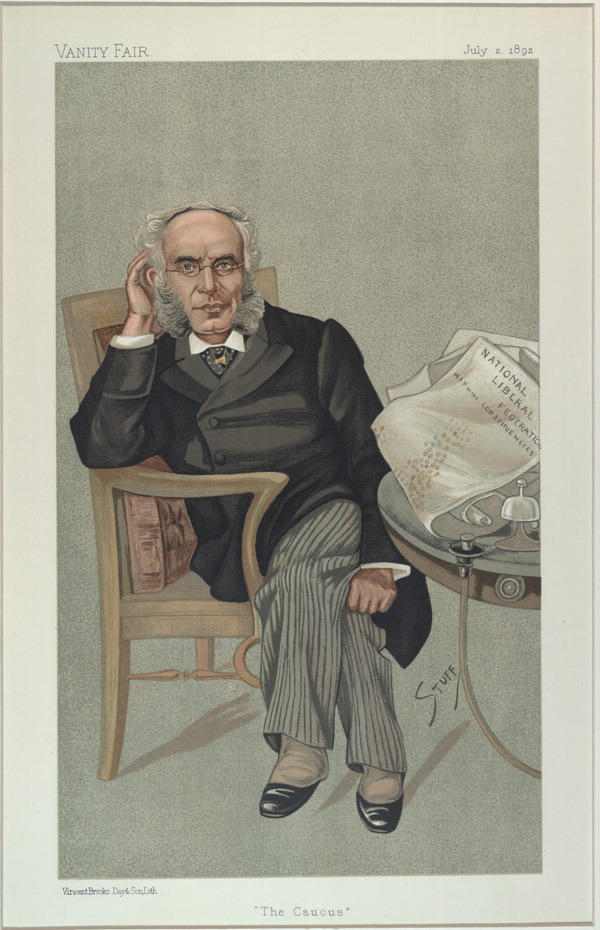
"The Caucus": 1892 caricature of Francis Schnadhorst, Secretary of the National Liberal Federation 1877–93, published in Vanity Fair

The NLF's early associations were with the city of Birmingham. Its structure – which became known as the "Caucus" – was modelled on that of the Birmingham Liberal Association, founded in 1865, which had been so effective in building a mass membership and an efficient electioneering body in the city under the political leadership of Joseph Chamberlain, and drawing on the strategic and organisational skills of William Harris (secretary 1868–73) and Francis Schnadhorst (secretary 1873–84). At the establishment of the NLF, Chamberlain was elected its president (1877–80), Harris its chairman (1877–82), Schnadhorst its salaried secretary (1877–93), and John Skirrow Wright, another Birmingham activist, its treasurer (1877–1880).

== Political orientation ==
In the Liberal split over Irish Home Rule the NLF was loyal to party leader Gladstone rather than its own progenitor Joseph Chamberlain, who left the Liberal party and formed the Liberal Unionist faction and coalition with Conservatives. However, in its political orientation generally the NLF conference tended to take the Radical approach, most clearly in its support of the Newcastle Programme in 1891 (see below). Here it endorsed the extension of the Factory Acts, the introduction of universal male suffrage, an end to plural voting and the reform of the House of Lords. This brought conflict with Gladstone until his retirement from politics in 1894. However, by 1900 the role of the NLF had become merely advisory in term of policy.

== Relationship with the Liberal Central Association (LCA) ==
=== Formation of the LCA ===
There was always the possibility of a clash between the NLF and the Liberal Central Association (LCA), the body (first known as the Liberal Registration Association) which had been formed on 21 February 1860 by twenty Liberal MPs to promote general co-operation between MPs and organisation in the constituencies. It changed its name to the LCA in 1874 and re-modelled its structure and purpose to become the "central medium of communication with and between the Party throughout the whole kingdom in aid of and in connection with local organization". The chairman of the LCA was originally the Leader of the Liberal MPs but by the end of the 19th century it was the Liberal Chief Whip. As the 19th century wore on, the role of the LCA changed from that of a members' association to that of a Liberal Whips' Office. It put local Liberal Associations in touch with potential candidates and made grants of money to help with elections. It had no policy role but supporters of various factions within the party did try to capture the offices of the LCA from time to time, most notably in the dissensions in the party over imperialism.

=== Amalgamation ===
The likelihood of a clash between LCA and NLF was greatly reduced when the NLF moved to London in 1886 into premises at 42 Parliament Street, next door to the LCA offices which were located at 41 Parliament Street. It also helped that Francis Schnadhorst, the efficient political organiser and secretary of the NLF was also appointed secretary of the LCA.

=== Liberal Publications Department ===
The NLF produced some political literature early in its history. However, in 1887 the NLF and LCA collaborated in the establishment of the new Liberal Publications Department, and these three organisations subsequently worked closely together at the administrative heart of the party.

== The Newcastle Programme ==
After the split between the party and Chamberlain over Home Rule, and the support the NLF offered to Gladstone, the NLF began to be more fully aware of the influence it was acquiring. This culminated with the Newcastle Programme of 1891, designed to be a co-ordinated programme of policies for radical reform springing from the grass-roots of the party – a manifesto for the next general election.

== 1900–1936 ==
Organisationally the NLF was the pillar of the Liberal Party. Under the presidency of Augustine Birrell it played an important role in the Liberal landslide election victory of 1906. It was active in promoting the Free Trade campaign after 1903 and through the work of Robert Hudson helped put in place a number of local pacts with the newly founded Labour Representation Committee. During the First World War, despite the opposition of many Liberals, the NLF helped to rally recruitment to the armed forces. After 1918 the NLF began to experience some financial difficulties but was able to remain solvent under the presidencies of Sir George Lunn and J. M. Robertson. They, together with secretary Robert Hudson, remained staunch supporters of H. H. Asquith and as a result Lloyd George had to keep his own National Liberal organisation in place between 1918 and 1922. When Lloyd George became party leader in 1926, Hudson, who was by then NLF Treasurer, resigned.

The NLF continued in being until 1936 when an internal review of party organisation under Lord Meston recommended its replacement with a body with a different remit, the Liberal Party Organisation.

== National Liberal Federation officers ==
=== Presidents ===
See President of the National Liberal Federation

=== Chairmen ===
- 1877–1882: William Harris
- 1882–1886: William Kenrick
- 1886–1890: Walter Foster
- 1890–1893: Robert Spence Watson (held jointly with presidency)
- 1893–1894: Francis Schnadhorst
- 1894–1918: Edward Evans
- 1918–1920: George Lunn
- 1920–1931: Arthur Brampton
- 1931–1933: Ramsay Muir
- 1933–1934: Ronald Walker
- 1934–1936: Milner Gray

=== Treasurers ===
- 1877–1880: John Skirrow Wright
- 1880–?: Charles Cochrane
- 1887–1903: Williiam Henry Hart
- 1903–1907: John Massie
- 1907–1910: Robert Bird
- 1910–1923: Frank Wright
- 1923–1927: Robert Hudson
- 1927–1934: Sir Francis Layland-Barratt
- 1934–1936: Percy Heffer

=== Secretaries ===
- 1877–1893: Francis Schnadhorst
- 1893–1922: Robert Hudson
- 1922–1925: Frank Barter
- 1925–1930: H. Oldman
- 1930–1931: H. Oldman and William Robert Davies
- 1931–1936: William Robert Davies
