= Oula A. Alrifai =

Syrian activist

Oula Alnashar Alrifai (Arabic: علا الرفاعي; born September 12, 1986) is a Syrian emigrant to the United States and writer for various Washington-based think tanks.

== Political activities ==
Oula is a co-founder and executive director of SANAD Syria. She was featured with her family in The Washington Post newspaper on an account of their activism and support for rebels in the Syrian civil war. Alrifai is Ammar Abdulhamid's step-daughter. Alrifai, with her parents (Ammar Abdulhamid and Khawla Yusuf) and her brother Mouhanad, sought political asylum in Washington, D.C., in 2005. She was a senior fellow at Washington Institute for Near East Policy. Alrifai has written for prestigious American magazines including Foreign Affairs, The Washington Post, CNN, The National Interest, The Hill, and CTC Sentinel. Her research and policy analysis focus on Syria and the Middle East. Oula became a U.S. citizen in 2016. In 2018, she released her documentary, Tomorrow's Children.

== Education ==
In December 2011 Alrifai received her B.A. from the University of Maryland, College Park in Government and Politics and Middle East studies, where she was awarded the full-tuition Academic Excellence Scholarship until her graduation. Alrifai is a member of the National Political Science Honor Society (Pi Sigma Alpha) and a member of the International Honor Society (Phi Theta Kappa). Alrifai holds a Master of Arts in Middle Eastern studies from Harvard University. Her thesis, The Self-Flagellation of a Nation: Assad, Iran, and Regime Survival in Syria, focuses on the development of the Iranian-Syrian relationship in the 1970s and 1980s through the lens of religio-political dynamics. It is now available at Harvard Library.
