= Hamza Arsbi =

Jordanian-born Canadian social entrepreneur

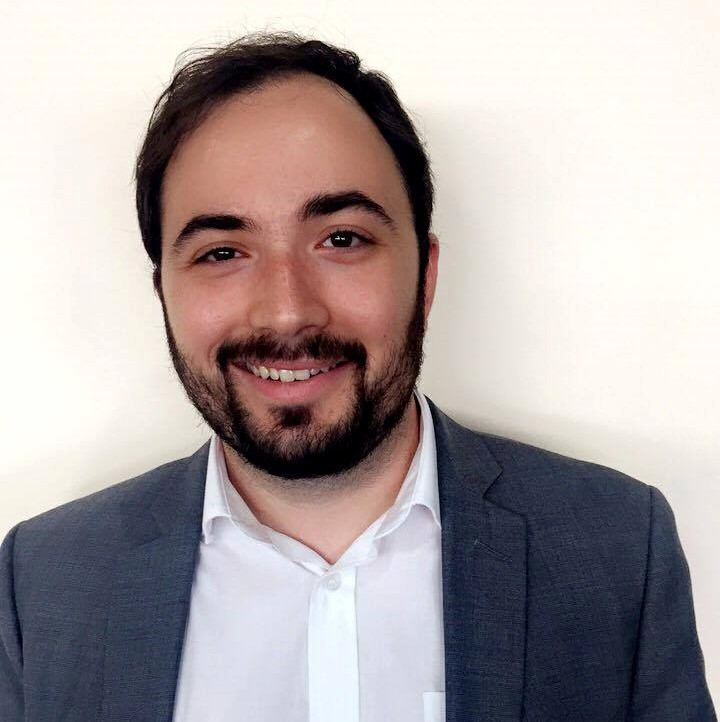
- Born: 1991 (age 34–35); Amman, Jordan
- Education: PhD in Education
- Occupation: Social entrepreneur
- Writing career
- Notable awards: Obama Foundation Scholar, Dalai Lama Fellow, AMENDS Fellow, Chevening-Said Scholar, Laureate Global Fellow, US President's Volunteer Service Award

Hamza Arsbi (born 1 July 1991 in Jordan) is a social entrepreneur living in Canada. He is known for his work on access to education and education policy. His work has been recognized by several international awards and fellowships, such as the Laureate Global Fellowship, the Dalai Lama Fellowship, and the Obama Foundation, where he was awarded the Obama Foundation’s Scholarship at Columbia University in 2020–2021.

Hamza Arsbi is known for his work as founder of the Mind Lab, a social enterprise working on increasing access to quality education for refugee and underserved communities. He also worked on the Melting Pot – Jordan, a video series documenting the stories and food of Jordan’s minority communities.

== Early life and education ==
Born in Jordan in July 1991, Hamza grew up in Sweileh, a small town near the capital, Amman. He was born to a Chechen father and a Circassian mother, an ethnic minority making up only 3% of the Jordanian population. He went on the Kennedy-Lugar Youth Exchange & Study (YES) Program to the US, where he spent a year of study. During his time there, Hamza participated in many volunteer initiatives and earned the Gold President’s Volunteer Service Award as well as an honorary membership the Phi Theta Kappa.

He completed an undergraduate degree in Psychology from the University of Jordan and went on to complete a Master’s Degree in International Development at the University of Manchester with a Chevening – Said Foundation Scholarship. In 2020, he received a post-graduate education and leadership training at Columbia University as part of the Obama Foundation Scholars Program.

== Career ==
In 2012, Hamza Arsbi, a second year university student, founded the Science League, later to be renamed the Mind Lab. Started as a volunteer group, the initiative was focused on providing children from underserved and rural communities with access to high quality education in Science, Technology, Engineering, the Arts, and Math (STEAM). After receiving the American Middle Eastern Network for Dialogue at Stanford (AMENDS) Fellowship and the BADIR Fellowship, the Mind Lab managed enough support to establish itself as a social enterprise with its own curriculum development capacity. This expanded their work nationally. By the time Hamza stepped down as CEO of the Mind Lab, it had reached over nine thousand students in seven cities and developed a series of educational content in Robotics, Engineering, Mindfulness, and Design Thinking. It also became under the patronage of AlHussein Technical University.

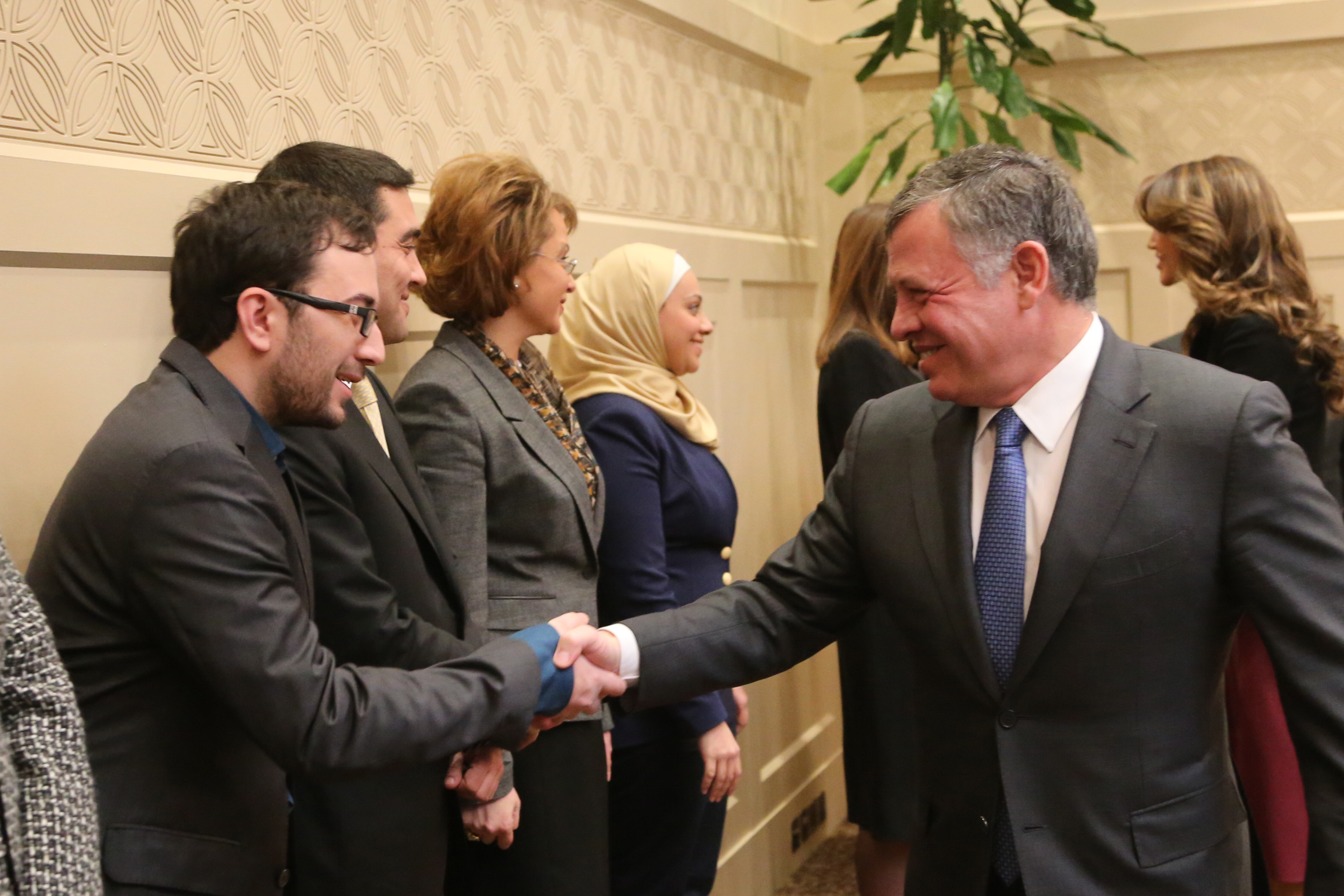
Hamza Arsbi meeting King Abdullah II of Jordan as a National Success Story

During his time as CEO of the Mind Lab, Hamza led the development of the Introspective Design Thinking Model, a new Design Thinking Model customized for children and youth under 18. He also developed his experience through a professional exchange program at the Technoseum (Mannheim, Germany) with an Institut für Auslandsbeziehungen scholarship and provided lectures, trainings, and consultancies with international governments, organizations, and academic institutions such as the Rhodes Trust and the International Youth Foundation. For his work, he was chosen as a National Success Story by King Abdullah II of Jordan.

=== Developmental Design Model ===
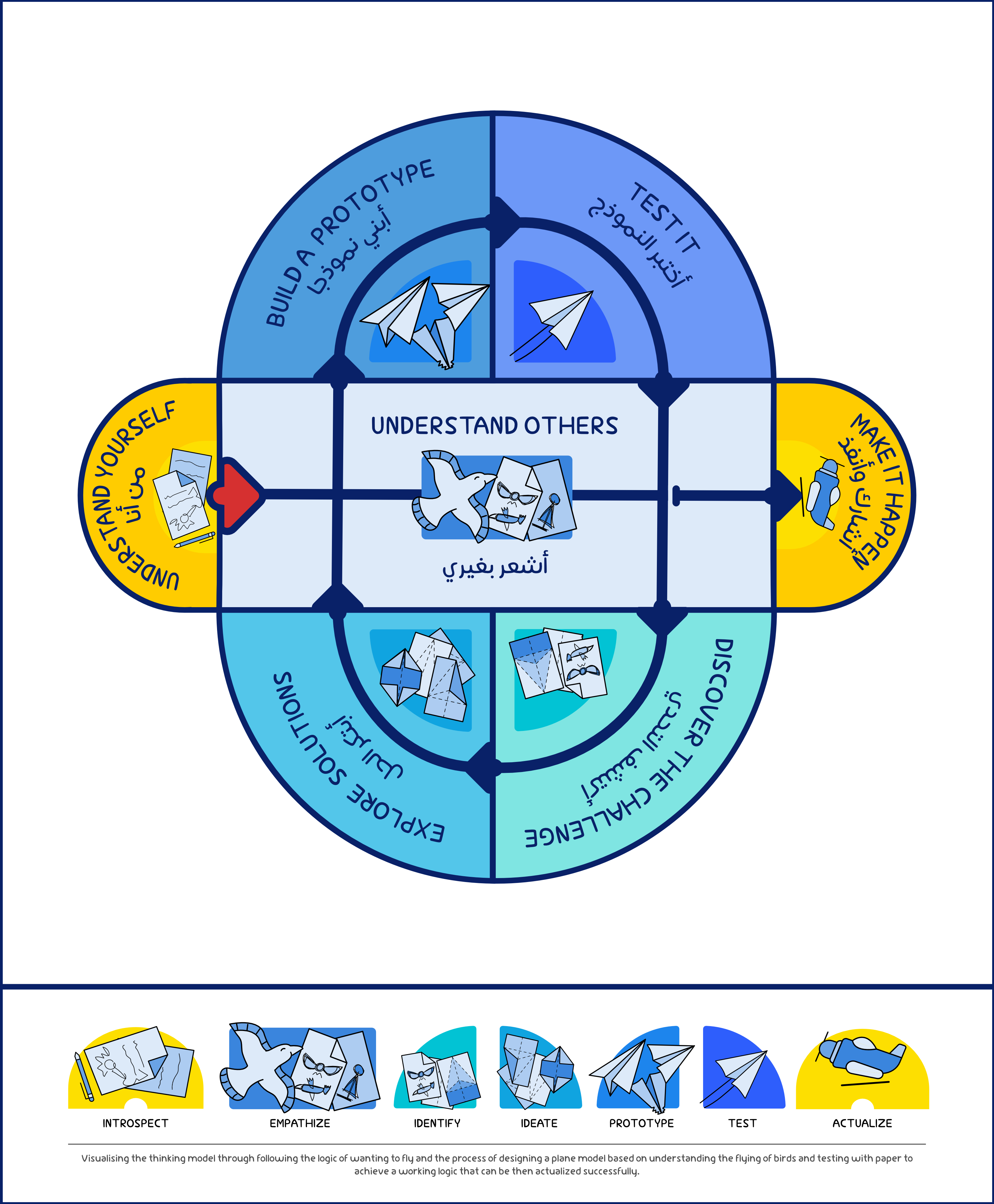
Developmental Design Model: Mainly useful in educational context, the proposed Design Thinking model highlights the need for introspection before empathy. It also emphasizes moving from the successful testing of ideas to concrete action.

Hamza has been a proponent of Design Thinking and its use in social change. He provided training and lectures on the utility of Design Thinking in advancing the work of Civil Society and social entrepreneurship world wide. Through the Mind Lab, he has been working on producing new content that would introduce K-12 Students to Design Thinking as a useful problem-solving tool that also develops empathy. In 2021, he proposed an enhanced Developmental Design Model that was design for less experienced users, especially children and youth, who need to (1) understand the Design Thinking terminology and (2) begin with personal growth and development. He argued that the original Design Thinking methodology assumed that the user already knows the general topic they want to tackle, that they have a clear awareness of their own identity, and that the awareness is developed enough to allow for true empathy. This process also assumes that the user has the tools and experience to carry the solutions to fruition once testing is completed successfully.

The Developmental Design Model was proposed as a solution to these issues. Stating that "exploring introspection before empathy to offer an accessible entry point for young designers". He went on to expand on the model and provide further tools for educators and other designers to use for introspection.

=== Other Activities ===
In addition to co-authoring a book in Arabic on the relationship between religion and science under the title 'Philosophy and the Divine' that was limited in circulation, Hamza has launched his own video documentary project under the title ‘Melting Pot – Jordan’. A project tackling minority representation and local diversity in Jordan through short videos that showcase the life stories, experiences, and food of different groups that are part of Jordanian society.
