= George Lunn (British politician) =

Sir George Lunn DL JP (26 November 1861 – 21 July 1939) was a British Liberal Party politician.

== Biography ==
He was born in Newcastle-upon-Tyne on 26 November 1861.

Lunn studied at the Wesleyan Orphan House School and the Royal Grammar School, then worked in shipping, forming Lunn and MacCoy in the 1890s. He also volunteered as a Methodist lay preacher.

In 1901, Lunn was elected to Newcastle City Council as a Liberal, and he pursued an interest in educational administration, chairing the council's education committee from 1905 until his death, and also serving on and chairing the National Association of Education Committees of England and Wales. He also served as Lord Mayor of Newcastle from 1915 until 1918.

Lunn stood for Newcastle-upon-Tyne North at the 1918 general election, but failed to win the seat. He instead took office as the Chairman and President of the National Liberal Federation, serving until 1920.

He died on 21 July 1939.

Party political offices
Preceded by Edward Evans	Chairman of the National Liberal Federation; 1918–1920	Succeeded by Arthur Brampton
Preceded by John Brunner	President of the National Liberal Federation; 1918–1920	Succeeded by John M. Robertson
