= Venetta Seals =

American politician

Mayor of Pecos, Texas
- In office May 2010 – June 2019
- Preceded by: Dick Alligood
- Succeeded by: David Flores

Personal details
- Education: University of Texas at El Paso

Venetta Seals is an American politician and businesswoman who was the mayor of Pecos, Texas from May 2010 to June 2019. Before serving as mayor, Seals was the president of the Pecos Area Chamber of Commerce.

== Education and career ==
Seals graduated from Tyler Junior College with an Associate of Arts, and was a member of Phi Theta Kappa. She continued her education at the University of Texas at Tyler and the University of Texas at El Paso, eventually graduating with a bachelor's degree in commercial art design with a minor in English literature. While working towards her bachelor's degree, she was a member of Phi Beta Kappa.

Prior to becoming mayor, Seals served as the president of the Pecos Area Chamber of Commerce, and is currently a board member. She is the owner of Hang Your Hat Storage, and is the director of public relations, marketing, community development, physician recruitment, and grants for the Reeves County Hospital District.

Prior to being elected mayor, Seals was a member of the Pecos City Council for four years.

== Mayor of Pecos ==
On May 8, 2010, Venetta Seals won the mayoral election with 49% of the vote. She defeated David L. Flores by two percentage points. During her first two-year term as mayor, she saw a spike in housing demand due to increased oil drilling activity in the Wolfbone formation under Reeves County. Pecos' population increased from 8,680 in 2010, to around 9,500 in early 2012, and the Pecos City Council voted to open a 500-capacity RV park to deal with the increase. She also had to deal with the sudden death of City Manager Joseph Gilbert Torres on March 31, 2011, following his indictment for indecency with a child.

On May 12, 2012, Seals was re-elected for a second term, with 496 of 956 votes. She defeated Bernadette Portillo Lopez and Noel Mata Ybarra. During her second term, she defended O'Hara Flying Service, the city's air ambulance, after it was found to have state EMS rule violations. She also dealt with the prolonged closure of the Pecos Zoo due to new regulations.

On May 10, 2014, Seals was re-elected for a third term, defeating David L. Flores with 51% of the vote to his 49%. In September 2014, she oversaw the city's response to heavy flooding after the Pecos River overflowed, with help from state and federal agencies. In June 2015, the Mayor supported the council's ban on plastic bags.

Seals was re-elected for a fourth term on May 7, 2016, with a 35-vote lead.

She ran for a fifth term in the May 4, 2019, mayoral election but failed to garner enough votes against opponents David L. Flores and Jesus Orosco, leading to a runoff between Seals and Flores. The runoff election occurred on June 8, 2019, and resulted in Seals losing to Flores by 221 votes.
