= Ammar Abdulhamid =

Syrian-born author

Ammar Abdulhamid عمار عبد الحميد
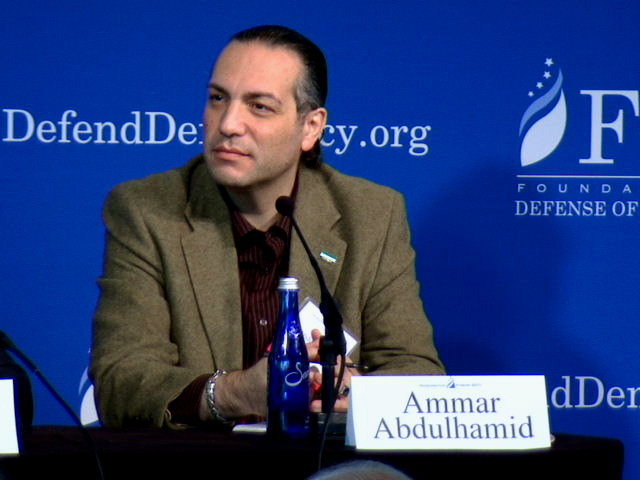
- Abdulhamid at FDD
- Born: 30 May 1966 (age 60); Damascus, Syria
- Education: University of Wisconsin–Stevens Point
- Occupations: Author, Activist and thinker
- Spouse: Khawla Yusuf
- Children: Oula and Mouhanad
- Website: ammarabdulhamid.com Syrian Revolution Digest

Ammar Abdulhamid (Arabic: عمار عبد الحميد; born 30 May 1966) is a Syrian-born author, human rights activist, political dissident, co-founder and president of the Tharwa Foundation. Ammar was featured in the Arabic version of Newsweek magazine as one of 43 people making a difference in the Arab world in May 2005.

== Career ==
=== Early life ===
Abdulhamid was born on 30 May 1966, to Syrian actress Muna Wassef and the late Syrian filmmaker Muhammad Shahin in Damascus, Syria.

By mid-1987, Ammar embraced the religion of his father, Islam and was a committed Sunni Muslim. He told he had the intention of flying to Afghanistan via Pakistan to join the Mujahideen and fight in the Soviet–Afghan War but decided against it once he found out that after the Soviet withdrawal, the Mujahideen were fighting each other.

He spent approximately eight years in the United States (1986–1994), studying astronomy and history. He graduated from the University of Wisconsin–Stevens Point in 1992 with a Bachelor of Science in history. He returned to Damascus in September 1994.

Ammar briefly taught social studies at the Pakistan International School of Damascus (PISOD) then located in Mazzeh, Damascus, between 1995 and 1997.

He married author and human-rights activist Khawla Yusuf.

Adbulhamid and Yusuf fled Damascus in September 2005, after calling for the overthrow of the Assad government. They currently live in Washington, D.C., with their two children Oula (1986) and Mouhanad (1990) awaiting political asylum in the United States. Oula works at the Washington Institute for Near East Policy and writes regularly. Mouhanad has recently joined the International Medical Corps team.

=== Career ===
Abdulhamid was a visiting fellow in the Saban Center for Middle East Policy at the Brookings Institution 2004–2006.

Abdulhamid was a fellow at the Foundation for Defense of Democracies and is member of its Syria Working Group.

Abdulhamid was the first Syrian to ever testify in front of American Congress 2006/2008 against what he viewed as crimes by the Syrian president Bashar al-Assad and briefed presidents of the United States among other world leaders.

=== Syrian revolution ===
In April 2012, a delegation of Syrian opposition members including Abdulhamid, visited Pristina, Kosovo. Abdulhamid said Kosovo had walked the path of civil war which "would be very useful for us" to learn from. The visit was used by Russian disinformation campaigns to suggest that a Syrian training camp would be created in Kosovo.

In 2012, Abdulhamid warned of deepening sectarianism in Syria as a result of government responses to the uprising.

In 2014, Abdulhamid called for the United States to arm the Syrian opposition, enforce a no-fly zone and expand U.S. military action beyond Iraq.

== Foundations ==
Abdulhamid and Yusuf have founded several politically oriented foundations:

- DarEmar: In 2003, they established DarEmar, a publishing house and non-governmental organization dedicated to raising the standards of civic awareness in the Arab world.
- Tharwa Foundation: In 2003, they founded the Tharwa Project while still residing in Syria. After relocating to the U.S. in 2005, they founded the Tharwa Foundation as an offshoot. The foundation is a nonprofit, nonpartisan, grassroots political organization that encourages diversity, development, and democracy in Syria and across Southwest Asia and North Africa. (The foundation's name comes from the Arabic word tharwa or "wealth" while playing on thawra or "revolution.") The foundation works to break the information blockade imposed by the government of Bashar al-Assad with a cadre of local activists and citizen journalists to report on socio-political issues in Syria.
- Hands Across the Mideast Support Alliance (HAMSA): In 2008, Abdulhamid co-founded Hands Across the Mideast Support Alliance (HAMSA), an initiative to mobilize international grassroots support for democracy activists in the Arab world.
- I Am Syria: a non-profit media based campaign founded in 2012, that seeks to educate the world of the Syrian conflict. This movement is dedicated to let the people of Syria know that the world is supporting them through video, pictures, and media attention.
