= Tharwa Foundation =

- Formation: 2003
- Type: Non-Profit
- Location: Washington, DC.
- President / Co-Founder: Ammar Abdulhamid
- Website: http://tharwa.org

Tharwa Foundation (Arabic مؤسسة ثروة) is a nonprofit, nonpartisan grassroots organization that encourages diversity, development and democracy in Syria and the broader Middle East/North Africa. The Foundation derives its name from the Arabic word, tharwa. Founded in 2003, the Tharwa Foundation is an offshoot of the Tharwa Project, an initiative launched in Damascus Syria by Ammar Abdulhamid and Khawla Yusuf. Abdulhamid is a blogger, human rights activist and author. Yusuf is an author, politician, and human rights activist.

The Tharwa Foundation released its manifesto in early 2007. As of May 2008, it has been signed by 100 nonviolent human rights activists in the region.

== Mission statement ==
The Tharwa Foundation was established to provide a supportive environment for democratic principles and practices in the broader Middle East and North Africa region. Through programs that encourage inter-communal dialogue and leadership development, Tharwa uses a range of educational, networking and outreach strategies to enable people of different religious, economic and ethnic backgrounds to come together to discuss peaceful solutions to the region's longstanding socio-political and development challenges.

Since its inception, Tharwa has been guided by a vision for the region’s future, based upon:

- The emergence of an open and self-empowering commonwealth of nations in the broader Middle East and North Africa region, where traditional communal identifications – ethnic, religious, and linguistic – are sources of the region's wealth and prosperity, rather than its division and decline
- Increased political awareness and issue-based, grassroots mobilization among disenfranchised groups in the region
- A growing role for local, national, and supranational non-state actors and institutions, forming the basis of vibrant civil societies where diversity is respected and celebrated
- Democratic governments that respond to the demands and needs of their citizens and address the basic developmental challenges of their countries and their growing problems of economic stagnation, political alienation, apathy and extremism
- Respect for the rights of all persons residing in the region, in accordance with the principles outlined in the United Nations Universal Declaration of Human Rights and other international conventions on human rights.

== Background ==
=== History of the Tharwa Project ===
The Tharwa Foundation was established to continue the work of the Tharwa Project, an independent initiative launched in Syria in 2001 by activist and dissident Ammar Abdulhamid to spotlight the living conditions of religious and ethnic minorities and foster constructive dialogue between majority and minority communities in the broader Middle East and North Africa (MENA) region, in the hope of enabling the creation of new bridges of inter-communal trust and understanding, facilitating the ongoing processes of democratization and modernization and helping to stem the rising tide of extremist ideologies.

With a small paid staff, and a larger network of regular contributing reporters, Tharwa developed communication tools to enable inter-communal dialogue in the MENA region. Utilizing an interactive website, online publications, and a number of regional and international advisors and partnering institutions, such as BitterLemons, the Institute for War and Peace Reporting (IWPR), Pax Christi Nederland, Hivos, Heinrich Boell Stiftung, and openDemocracy.net, Tharwa fostered new avenues for communications and grassroots activism in the region.

However, as the Project continued to produce reports on the sensitive issues of minority rights and political reform, it attracted increased scrutiny from the government in Syria, impairing its ability to operate freely there. Eventually, Abdulhamid, himself a vocal critic of the Syrian government, was asked to leave the country. He returned to the United States on 7 September 2005.

=== The establishment of the Tharwa Foundation ===
Despite these setbacks for the Project, the Tharwa team continues to operate openly in Syria and the broader MENA region, and the number of its members, supporting partners and regular contributors is on the rise.

The Tharwa Foundation established its headquarters in the Washington, DC, area in December 2006. The Foundation currently sponsors a number of activities in the region such as the Tharwa Institute for Democratic Leadership, launched in 2007 to help train a new generation of young democracy activists. Tharwa's multimedia reports and publications are now hosted online at the Tharwa Foundation website. The US office now administers and coordinates Tharwa's programs and activities, and hopes to expand the scope of these activities over the coming years to enable the emergence of a new, diverse class of democratic leaders, empowered to represent the true aspirations of the people of the broader MENA region.

== Manifesto ==
Tharwa's manifesto reads as follows:

The Tharwa Commonwealth, commonly referred to as the Middle East, the Greater Middle East, and the Muslim World among other inaccurate appellations, suffers from many intrinsic problems that have pushed its states to the brink of social and political implosion.

- We believe that the Tharwa Commonwealth belongs to all its peoples, regardless of their ethnicity, religious background and social status.
- We believe that our strength in the Commonwealth lies in our diversity and in finding suitable ways to improve and strengthen communal interrelations, and suitable accommodations for the needs and aspirations of the various constituent communities in our midst.
- We believe in the rule of law, in the equality of all under the law, and in responsible, accountable, democratic governance.
- We believe in the freedom of all people to personal, political and artistic expression.
- We believe development and education are the keys to empowerment.
- We believe in the right of civil society leaders to take an active part in shaping the future of the Commonwealth .
- We believe that we are entitled to a fairer share in the global decision-making process and that the most convincing way to achieve this lies in development and education.
- We believe that the responsibility for peacemaking and conflict resolution in the Commonwealth rests primarily on our shoulders. The role of the international community lies not in imposing their solutions on us but in supporting and helping to guide our efforts in accordance with existing international laws and conventions.
- We believe that, while we have every right to fight for the independence and liberation of our occupied lands, we should be mindful that our national causes are not hijacked by the ruling regimes for the sake of justifying their continued oppression, and that our methods do not endanger the cause of developing our countries and societies.
- We believe in extending a hand of friendship to peoples across the world in order to empower ourselves and press our governments to adopt better more enlightened policies with regard to our interaction and intermingling.
- We believe in the need and necessity of establishing regional institutions, organizations and networks that can help us address our various developmental challenges in coordination with like-minded international institutions and organizations.

== Programs ==
=== The Tharwa Institute for Democratic Leadership ===
The Tharwa Institute for Democratic Leadership is a training initiative for emerging reformers and human rights activists from the broader Middle East and North Africa (MENA) region. The program consisted of two five-day workshops in Istanbul, and a six-month online course in Arabic addressing the key concepts of authoritarian and democratic political systems, political transitions, and advocacy campaign planning.

=== The Citizen Journalism Initiative ===
By sponsoring unaffiliated journalists, Tharwa hopes to provide an unfiltered source of news and analysis from citizens in Syria and the MENA region for regional analysts, researchers, and policymakers. The Foundation sponsors this program through hosting citizen journalists on the Syrian Elector website and the Tharwa Foundation website.

This Maryland-based non-profit acts as the mechanism to help thousands of Muslims highlight cross-culture commonalities and set aside divergent ideologies.
