= Solar San Antonio =

Solar San Antonio is a non-profit 501(c)(3) advocacy and resource center for renewable and sustainable energy applications. Solar San Antonio was founded by Bill Sinkin and the executive director is his son, Lanny Sinkin. Utilizing community education and outreach, they strive to decrease energy costs and provide opportunities for alternative energy in San Antonio and South Texas. By providing information directly to consumers, they have helped over 550 homeowners apply for solar energy, which has resulted in over 70 installations. According to Lanny Sinkin, this generated almost 3 million in economic activity in San Antonio, and an additional half a megawatt of distributed energy.

== Campaign initiatives ==
The Solar Home Improvement Loan was created by a collaboration between Solar San Antonio and the San Antonio Credit Union with low interest rates for interested homeowners.

SolarFest is an annual Solar San Antonio event at Maverick Park which provides information to the public about renewable energy technologies, the impact of sustainable living, and green building techniques. This is a 100% renewably powered event, and it featured over 90 exhibitors in 2011.

BringSolarHome is Solar San Antonio's attempt to bring together Community Education, Industry Development, and Financial Institution Development. Their website bringsolarhome.com facilitates the community education project and has an online calculator intended to project potential solar installation fees. To date, the Bring Solar Home campaign has spurred over 500 applications for solar energy rebates. According to Lanny Sinkin, the approved systems will inject $2 million into the local economy and add 300 kilowatts of solar power to the grid.

== Awards ==
Numerous awards have been bestowed upon Solar San Antonio, including but not limited to:

- Best Nonprofit in San Antonio Current Reader's Choice Awards (2011 and 2010)
- Best Green Award’ in the Downtown Alliance (2011)
- Finalist in the Excellence in Renewable Energy Awards (2011)
- San Antonio Business Journal “Going Green Awards” winner for Green Marketing Campaign (2010)
- Top 100 for USA TODAY #AmericaWants advertisement (2010)
- City Public Service Shining Star Award (2002)
- Texas Renewable Energy Industries Association Member of the Year Award (2001)
