= Francis Schnadhorst =

English draper and politician

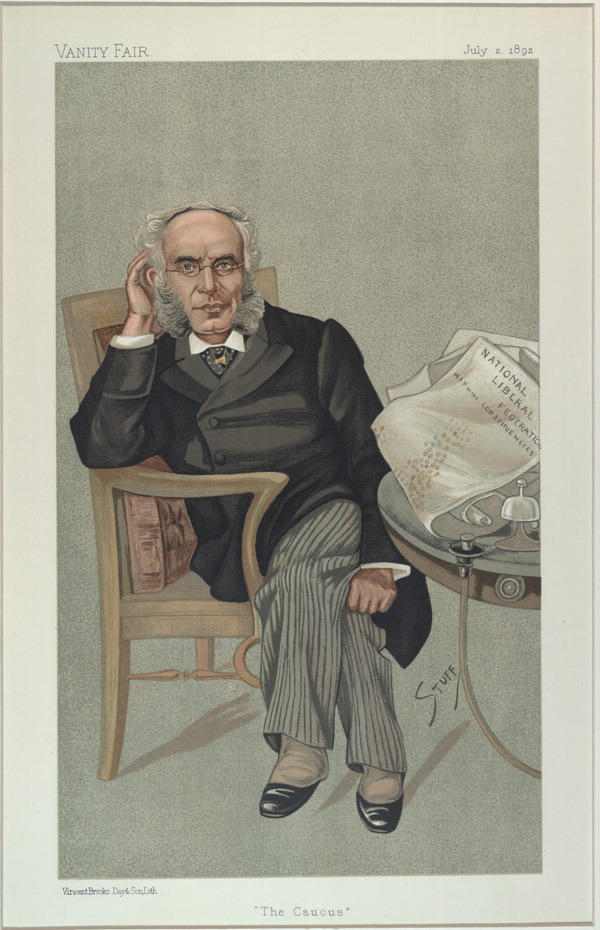
- "The Caucus": caricature by "Stuff" published in Vanity Fair in 1892.

Personal details
- Born: 24 August 1840
- Died: 2 January 1900 (aged 59) Roehampton, England
- Party: Liberal
- Spouse: Mary Anne Thomas
- Children: 3

Francis Schnadhorst (24 August 1840 – 2 January 1900) was a Birmingham draper and English Liberal Party politician. He briefly held elected office on Birmingham Council, and was offered the chance to stand for Parliament in winnable seats, but he found his true metier was in political organisation and administration both in his home town as secretary of the highly successful Birmingham Liberal Association from 1867 to 1884, and nationally as secretary of the newly formed National Liberal Federation from 1877 to 1893. He was famously described as "the spectacled, sallow, sombre" Birmingham draper who within a short period of time was to establish himself through the Birmingham Liberal caucus as one of the most brilliant organisers in the country.

== Family and education ==
Francis Schnadhorst was the son of a draper and hosier of German descent who carried on business in Bull Street, Birmingham. His father died when he was very young and he was brought up by his mother and his paternal grandfather who owned a tailoring business in Moor Street. He was educated at King Edward's School, Birmingham.

== Career ==
When Schnadhorst was sixteen his grandfather died, and Francis took over the family business. However, like many Victorian tradesman and ardent nonconformists, he was keenly interested in improving himself and his town. He involved himself in the civic life of Birmingham. He served as secretary to the Central Nonconformist Committee set up in Birmingham to oppose Church influence in education. He was also an active member of a number of Birmingham civic and local improvement societies. Through these groups and the close connection between nonconformity, self-help and Liberalism, Schnadhorst was drawn into political activity for the Liberal Party.

== Politics ==
=== Birmingham ===
Before the end of the 19th century the Liberal party's championing of reform and improvement had created in Birmingham a model of civic government. The 1885 Redistribution Act created seven single-member constituencies, more than doubling Birmingham's representation in Parliament. A Royal decree declared the corporation of the City of Birmingham in 1889 and the first Lord Mayor was elected in 1896. The local Liberal Party was compelled to rethink its structure in response to this civic expansion, and in anticipation of the additional electors enfranchised by the 1867 Reform Act. The Birmingham Liberal Association was established in 1865, and radically reorganised by its secretary, William Harris, in 1868: Schnadhorst succeeded Harris as secretary in 1873. Membership was open to anyone able to pay the one shilling annual fee, meaning that political participation was no longer the preserve of the traditional ruling classes. In 1868 the Association had 400 members, but by 1886 it had become known as "the Two Thousand". Its existence enabled the Liberals to fight general, town council and school board elections more effectively and successfully. This party structure was what subsequently became known, both locally and nationally, as the Liberal Caucus – a name initially coined by detractors as a term of abuse, but afterwards adopted by the Liberals themselves. As an example of political efficiency the Caucus could not be rivalled, and this was due in large part to Schnadhorst's administrative abilities.

Schnadhorst first became involved in political activity at the Birmingham election of 1867 when he took on the roles of vice-chairman and secretary to the St. George's Ward Liberal committee. He was himself briefly a member of the Council for St Mary's Ward in 1872, but was most effective as secretary of the Birmingham Liberal Association from 1873 onwards. The Liberals had already been electorally successful in Birmingham, particularly at the 1868 general election, but Schnadhorst bolstered the party's organisation to oust the Conservative and Anglican majorities on the town council and the school board. Joseph Chamberlain may have provided the political leadership to make Birmingham the "gas and water" socialist capital of Victorian civic life, but behind the scenes Schnadhorst was "the organising genius of the Birmingham association".

=== The chance of a Parliamentary seat ===
Before the 1885 general election, Schnadhorst was invited to stand in two Birmingham seats, South and East, both of which were subsequently won by the Liberals. However he did not wish to enter Parliament. He said he felt he could better promote the cause of Liberalism through his administrative work for the party. In 1890 he also turned down the offer of a seat in Newcastle-under-Lyme but by this time his health was deteriorating; he had already had to have some time off work on medical advice and had undertaken a holiday voyage to Australia a few years earlier.

=== National Liberal Federation ===
In 1877, along with Joseph Chamberlain and William Harris, Schnadhorst was instrumental in the establishment of the National Liberal Federation (NLF), and became its first secretary (with Chamberlain as president, and Harris as chairman). The Federation, which was set up for educational and propagandist purposes and co-ordinated the work of the several hundred Liberal associations in England and Wales, became a great political force and was largely responsible for Liberal victories of 1880, 1885, and 1892. In recognition of his services to the Liberal Party, Schnadhorst was presented with 10,000 guineas and an address at a banquet in 1887, following the removal of the National Liberal Federation from Birmingham to London. The formation of the NLF was the most important development in Liberal Party organisation after the 1874 general election which had seen the Liberals lose office and Benjamin Disraeli return to Number 10 Downing Street. The NLF held an annual conference which was regarded as being representative of the opinion of the party's rank and file. Chamberlain described it as "a really Liberal Parliament...elected by universal suffrage and with some regard for fair distribution of political power".

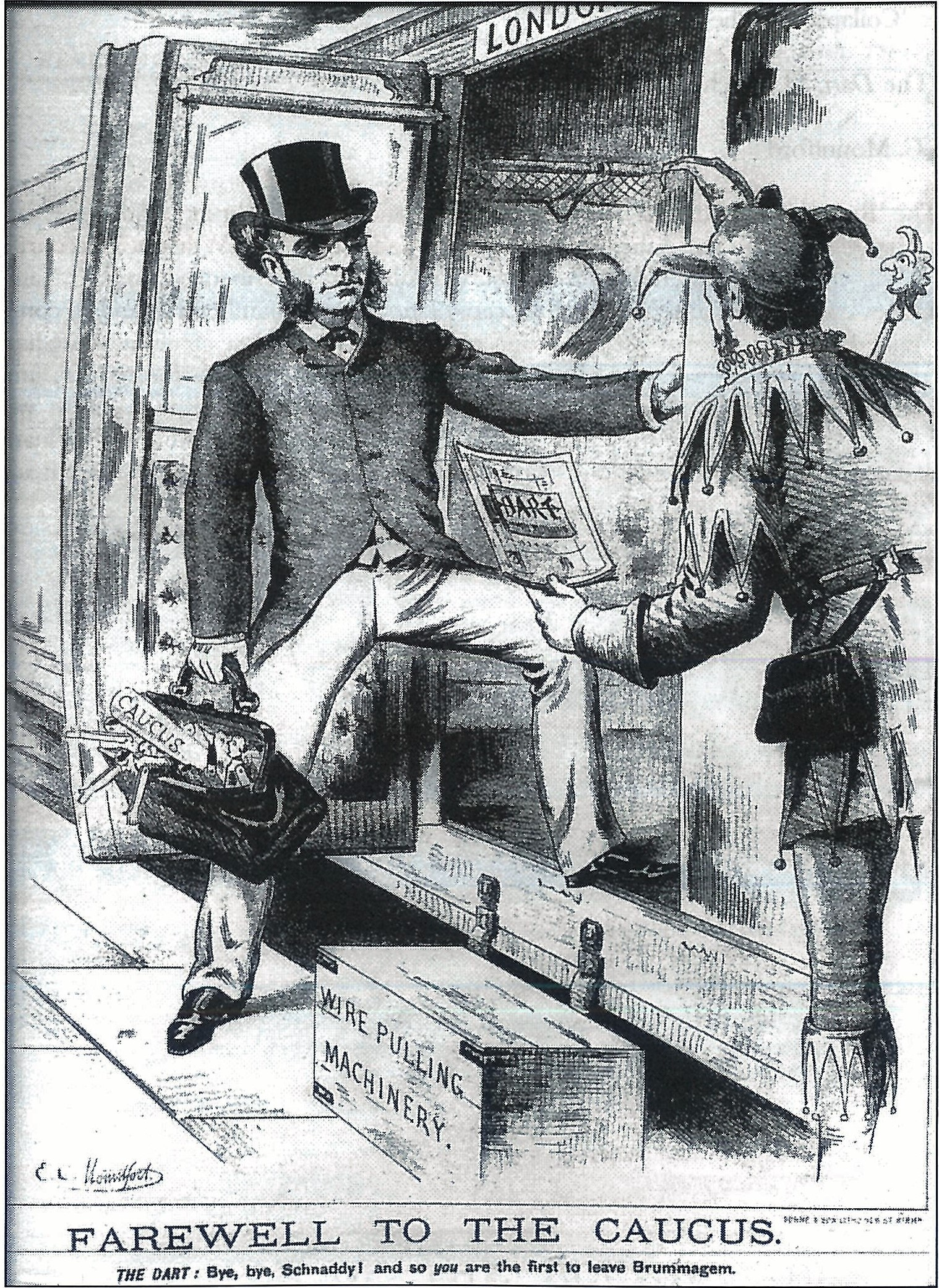
"Farewell to the Caucus": 1886 cartoon of Schnadhorst leaving Birmingham on a London-bound train, following the split in the Liberal Party over Irish Home Rule. His luggage includes a scroll marked "Caucus"; a number of string puppets; and a box of "wire pulling machinery".

In 1884 Schnadhorst resigned his post of secretary of the Birmingham Liberal Association to concentrate full-time on the NLF. As secretary, he became the link between the leadership and the constituency associations and hence the key figure in rebuilding the party following the split over Irish Home Rule and the defection of the Liberal Unionists. One of Schnadhorst's jobs was to provide speakers who would draw crowds at Liberal rallies and it was William Ewart Gladstone who addressed the inaugural meeting of the NLF at Bingley Hall, Birmingham in 1877. Schnadhorst's achievement in keeping the NLF Gladstonian rather than Chamberlainite in 1886, when the party split on the issue of Irish Home Rule and Birmingham followed Chamberlain into the Liberal Unionist fold, was of considerable importance to the Liberal Party. He reorganised the NLF to make it more responsive to the needs of local associations, so encouraging affiliations. In 1886, he also agreed to become the secretary of the Liberal Central Association, and revolutionised the Association's conduct of elections, the improvements being reflected in a series of favourable by-election results at the end of the 1880s.

=== Liberal Central Association ===
On 21 February 1860 twenty Liberal MPs had formed the Liberal Registration Association to promote general co-operation between MPs and assisting in the process of registering electors in constituencies where the Liberals were not well-organised. It changed its name to the Liberal Central Association in 1874 and re-modelled its structure and purpose to become the "central medium of communication with and between the Party throughout the whole kingdom in aid of and in connection with local organisation". The chairman of the LCA was originally the Leader of the Liberal MPs but by the end of the 19th century it was the Liberal Chief Whip. As the 19th century wore on, the role of the LCA changed from that of a members' association to that of a Liberal Whips' Office. It put local Liberal Associations in touch with potential candidates and made grants of money to help with elections. It had no policy role but supporters of various factions within the party did try to capture the offices of the LCA from time to time, most notably in the dissensions in the party over imperialism.

=== Resignation ===
Schnadhorst undertook other public duties, chairing Liberal meetings and rallies and in connection with campaigns and causes promoted by the Liberal Party. For example, he was elected one of the Vice-Presidents of the Free Land League in 1886. However, he resigned all party offices in 1893, almost certainly due to declining health, even though he was still only 53 years old. His achievement was recognised in many quarters and he earned the description in the publication Who's Who as the "chief organiser and adviser of the Liberal party, 1885–1892".

== Ill-health and death ==
Schnadhorst died at the Priory Hospital, described in the terminology of the day as a lunatic asylum, at Roehampton on 2 January 1900. He had been in declining health since the early 1890s. In 1894 he had suffered a mental breakdown leading to years of illness, including the suffering of convulsions. In December 1899 he was confined to bed and he never recovered. He also suffered increasingly from deafness as he got older. His funeral was held at Putney Cemetery on 6 January 1900.

== Personal life ==
Schnadhorst was married to Mary Anne Thomas (1845/6–1912), daughter of Edward Thomas, a Birmingham provision merchant. The couple had two sons and a daughter. Their youngest son, Frank Gladstone Schnadhorst volunteered to fight in the Boer War with Kitchener's Fighting Scouts and reached the rank of Lieutenant. He was wounded in action near Heilbron, Orange River Colony and died of his wounds on 22 October 1901 aged 21 years.

Francis' brother Edward Schnadhorst was a Congregationalist minister in east London who stood for election as a Liberal on a number of occasions to the London School Board.

== Papers ==
=== Birmingham ===
Schnadhorst's papers are mostly deposited at the Cadbury Research Library at the University of Birmingham. The collections consist of scrap albums of and relating to Francis Schnadhorst and illuminated addresses presented to him. There is also correspondence and other private papers principally relating to his activities as secretary to the Birmingham Liberal Association, to the National Liberal Federation and to the Liberal Central Association, 1867–1901. His correspondents include John Bright, William Gladstone, Arthur Morley, John Morley, Henry Labouchere, Lord Rosebery, Joseph Chamberlain, William Vernon Harcourt, Henry Campbell-Bannerman, Cecil Rhodes and many other political figures.

=== Bristol ===
There are also manuscript papers relating to Francis Schnadhorst and the organisation of the Liberal Party, 1881–1962, in the Liberal Party collection in Bristol University Library, Special Collections. Also deposited there and relevant to Schnadhorst are the minute books of the Liberal Central Association, 1860–1914, and the Proceedings of the Council of the National Liberal Federation, 1879–1939.

== Sources ==
- Barnsby, George J. (1989). Birmingham Working People: A History of the Labour Movement in Birmingham, 1650–1914. Integrated Publishing Services. p. 229.
- McGill, Barry (1962). "Francis Schnadhorst and Liberal Party Organization". Journal of Modern History. 34 (1): 19–39. doi:10.1086/238994. JSTOR 1874816. S2CID 143926079.
- Taylor, Eric (2013) [2004]. "Schnadhorst, Francis (1840–1900)". Oxford Dictionary of National Biography (online ed.). Oxford University Press. doi:10.1093/ref:odnb/37938. (subscription required)

Party political offices
Preceded by New position	Secretary of the National Liberal Federation; 1877–1893	Succeeded by Robert Hudson
