= Sweileh area =

Sweileh صويلح
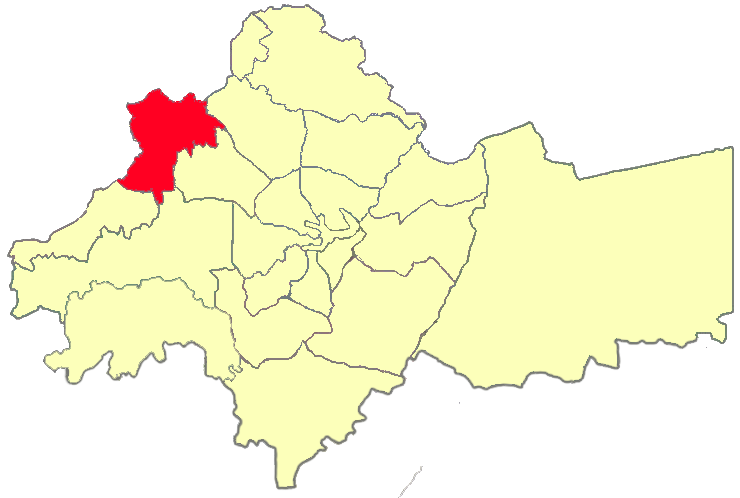

- Location within Jordan
- Coordinates: 32°1′48″N 35°49′47″E
- Country: Jordan
- Governorate: Amman Governorate
- Settled: 1906

Population (2015)
  - Total: 151,016
- Time zone: UTC + 2

Sweileh (Arabic: صويلح, romanized: Ṣuwayliḥ, alternatively spelled Suwaylih, Swaylih or Swaileh) is district number sixteen in Amman, Jordan out of twenty-seven. It lies to the north of the city center. It was founded by Chechen settlers in 1906 during Ottoman rule. It had a population of 151,016 in the 2015 census. The town is known for having a good climate throughout the year, it is one of the few districts of Amman that sees snow during winter due to its high altitude. The cultivation of olives and grapes, heavy industries, such as auto assembly, steel, and cement, make up the local economy. Today, it is considered one of Amman's most populated districts since it has the University of Jordan and is a connection point to other cities such as Salt, Irbid and Jarash.

== History ==
Sweileh was founded as an agricultural village called Ayn Suwaylih in 1906 by Circassian and Chechen settlers who were moved to the area by the Ottomans from other parts of the Empire. It was the fourth village in the Balqa region to be settled by Chechen refugees. On 3 May 1907 the settlement was raided by 2,000 Adwan, Abbad, Balqawiya and Bani Hasan tribesmen and townspeople from Salt and Fuheis in response to an earlier quarrel in which a Bedouin herder was wounded attempting to graze livestock on wheat fields claimed by the Chechens. The raid ended in the deaths of eleven settlers and the wounding of fifteen others, while a similar number of raiders were killed. All of the village's livestock and the entire contents of twenty-eight dwelling were stolen in the raid. The Ottoman authorities arrested sixty people allegedly involved the raid, including several tribal chiefs, dismissed the governor of the Salt kaza (district), and opened a wide-scale reparations project to compensate the Chechens. The population of the village according to the 1915 Ottoman census was 745. In the 1940s a road connecting Amman with Jabal Ajlun in the northeast of the country was opened through Sweileh; the new road was built for commercial and security purposes.

== Notable people ==
- Hamza Arsbi, businessman

== Bibliography ==
- Barakat, Nora Elizabeth (Spring 2015). An Empty Land? Nomads and Property Administration in Hamidian Syria (PDF) (PhD). Berkeley: University of California.
- Rogan, Eugene L. (1994). "Bringing the State Back: The Limits of Ottoman Rule in Jordan, 1840–1910". In Rogan, Eugene L.; Tell, Tariq (eds.). Village, Steppe and State: The Social Origins of Modern Jordan. London: British Academic Press. p. 46. ISBN 1-85043-829-3.
- Rogan, Eugene L.; Tell, Tariq, eds. (1994). Village, Steppe and State: The Social Origins of Modern Jordan. London: British Academic Press. p. 146. ISBN 1-85043-829-3.
