= Texas caucuses =

The Texas caucuses are a political event associated with primaries, the process by which voters in the U.S. state of Texas ultimately select their parties' nominees for various offices. The process as a whole has been referred to as the Texas Two-step, after the partner dance of the same name, because Texans were required to first vote in the primary election in order to be eligible for participation in party caucuses in which delegates were selected.

The current process differs for Democrats and Republicans.

The Republican Party of Texas has a winner-take-all provision in its primary, and the chances any candidate will get all of that party's Texas delegates are very small. That candidate would have to win more than 50 percent of the vote statewide, and also in each of the state's 38 congressional districts, to run the table. Absent such an event, a pro-rata system is followed to allocate delegates roughly according to votes received.

The Texas Democratic Party no longer selects state delegates at caucuses. After the votes of Texans participating in the Democratic primary are counted, delegates are awarded among the candidates who received 15 percent or more of the vote, in proportion to the votes received by each.

It would be even harder for a Democrat than for a Republican to get all of the Texas delegates from their party in a presidential primary. A democratic candidate could do so only by winning 85 percent of the vote statewide and, separately, 85% in each and every one of Texas’ 31 state Senate districts.

== Controversies ==
The Texas Democratic Party abandoned the former caucus-based "Texas Two-step" primary system in 2015.

The Democratic County (Senate District) Conventions in late March 2008 produced a great deal of confusion. Both Clinton and Obama supporters had complaints about how these conventions were conducted. The most common complaint had to do with the fact that delegates were not being apportioned based on Precinct Convention results. For instance, in Kleberg County, 9 delegates were elected to attend the State Convention, with only one Obama supporter among them. Obama won about one third of the votes in the Precinct Caucuses/Conventions in Kleberg County.
