= Joan Elizabeth Woollard =

- Born: 25 September 1916; Birmingham, England
- Died: 30 January 2008 (aged 91)
- Resting place: St Peter's Church, Wootton Wawen
- Education: Birmingham School of Art
- Occupations: Teacher; Artist
- Organization: Royal Birmingham Society of Artists
- Parent: Frank George Woollard

Joan Elizabeth Woollard, PPRBSA (25 September 1916 – 30 January 2008) was a Birmingham, England born artist, mainly specialising in sculpture. She was a member of the Royal Society of British Sculptors and a member of the Royal Birmingham Society of Artists (RBSA) as well as being its first female President between 1978 and 1980.

Woollard was the only child of Catherine Elizabeth Richards (1878–1941) and Frank George Woollard (1883–1957) who married in 1910. The entire family is buried at St Peter's Church in Wootton Wawen.

== Career ==
Woollard studied under Bernard Fleetwood-Walker at the School of Painting in the Birmingham School of Art between 1946 and 1955, achieving a National Diploma in Design. Between 1952 and 1955 she took a portrait painting course under A. R. Middleton Todd at the City and Guilds of London Art School. During her time on the course, Woollard also attended classes at the Chelsea Art School as a guest student. She was briefly a student at the Royal Academy in 1955 but went to teach instead in 1956. Woollard also studied at the Courtauld Institute of Art gaining a Certificate in English Art.

Woollard began a teaching career in 1956 as an art teacher at King Edward VI High School for Girls, Birmingham which lasted until 1980.

Woollard practised in many fields of art such as painting, sculpture/ceramics and embroidery. During the later part of her life, embroidery was of particular interest as ceramics became difficult to work with in her older age.

== Exhibitions ==
Woollard exhibited at the Royal Academy in Painting and Sculpture, the New English Art Club, the Royal Society of Portrait Painters and the Salon. Her works of art can also be found in private collections in England, America and Canada.

Woollard was a President of the RBSA Gallery, so the RBSA Collection includes several of her artworks. Examples of some of these can be seen on the RBSA website.
