= Percy Shakespeare =

English painter

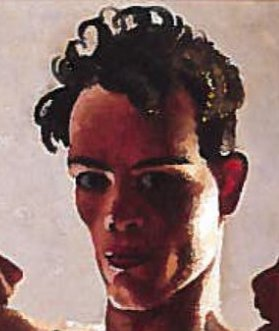
- Detail from Self Portrait - Morning Exercise
- Born: 28 February 1906; Kates Hill, Dudley, West Midlands, England
- Died: 25 May 1943 (aged 37); Brighton, Sussex, England
- Cause of death: Bombardment
- Education: Dudley Art School
- Alma mater: Birmingham School of Art
- Occupation: Painter

Percy Shakespeare (28 February 1906 – 25 May 1943) was an English painter who died in an air raid during the Second World War.

== Life ==
Shakespeare was born in 1906 in the working class area of Kates Hill, Dudley, the fourth of eight children of John Thomas Shakespeare and his wife Ada. His family subsequently moved to council housing on Maple Road in the nearby Wren's Nest Estate area. In 1920, after a chance meeting at the Dudley Museum and Art Gallery with Ivo Shaw, the principal of Dudley Art School, he was offered a scholarship place at the school for his eight years attendance where he showed a talent for figure drawing and portraits. Eventually he attended Birmingham School of Art and studied anatomical drawing under Harold Holden from 1923 to 1927, achieving an Art Masters Certificate in Anatomical Drawing, and qualifying as a teacher. He then taught part-time up to 1939, mostly at Birmingham Art School and occasionally at Kidderminster College.

For the rest of his life he continued to paint with a view to making that his career and produced a number of paintings each year (mainly in oil) that were submitted to the Royal Academy, and often accepted for exhibition. In 1933 he produced his most controversial painting, a self-portrait in which, it has been suggested, he is posing as the demonic figure Mephistopheles. In the same year, he had his first exhibit at the Royal Academy, "A Mulatto", a portrait of a lady which was later bought by Dudley Art Gallery. He also exhibited at the Paris Salon and at the Royal Birmingham Society of Artists, of which he was elected an associate in 1936. During this period, he was living in the family council house on the Wren's Nest. Despite his success at having his paintings included in prestigious exhibitions, few of them sold and his only significant income was from his teaching. He had no studio and often painted in his small bedroom.

When World War II broke out in 1939, he enlisted in the Royal Navy, and trained at HMS Vernon while continuing to paint in his spare time. In May 1943, whilst stationed ashore at Roedean School in East Sussex, he was killed in a bombing raid while he was walking alone opposite Marine Gate in Brighton.

== Work ==
=== General ===
Shakespeare's work after leaving art school concentrated on figure drawings and portraiture, this continued until he started on his Thirties at Leisure series in 1936. His major works outside this series included the following (photographs of titles highlighted in bold appear in the gallery):

- Portrait of Alan Young (1928)
- **Gwendoline Shakespeare (c1929)**
- Girl in Green Ball Gown (c1929)
- Self Portrait in pencil (c1930)
- Rasp Grinders (1932)
- Miss Molly Betteridge (1932)
- The Rendezvous (1932)
- Isobel (1932)
- **A Mulatto (1933)**
- **Self-portrait with Trilby (Mephistopheles) (1933)**
- **Mrs Neil Jenkins (1933)**
- **Seated Nude (1933)**
- **View from Artists Bedroom /The Window (c1934)**
- **Morning Exercise (1934)**
- **On the Rhine (1935)**
- White Gloves (1936)
- **Boy and Dog (1937)**
- **Girl with Daffodils (1937)**
- **Tennis Player (c1938)**
- **Schoolgirl (1938)**
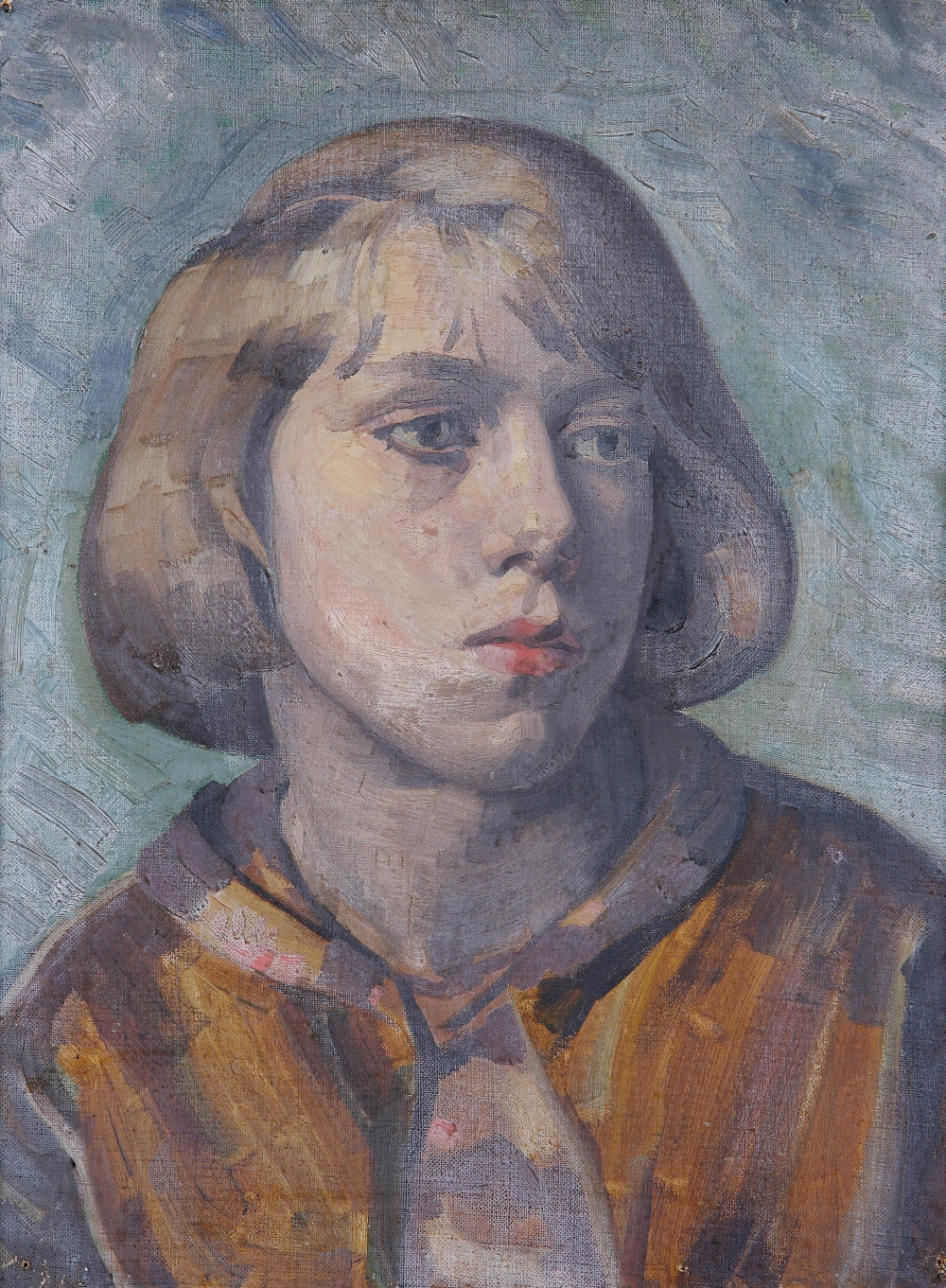
Gwendoline Shakespeare, 1929

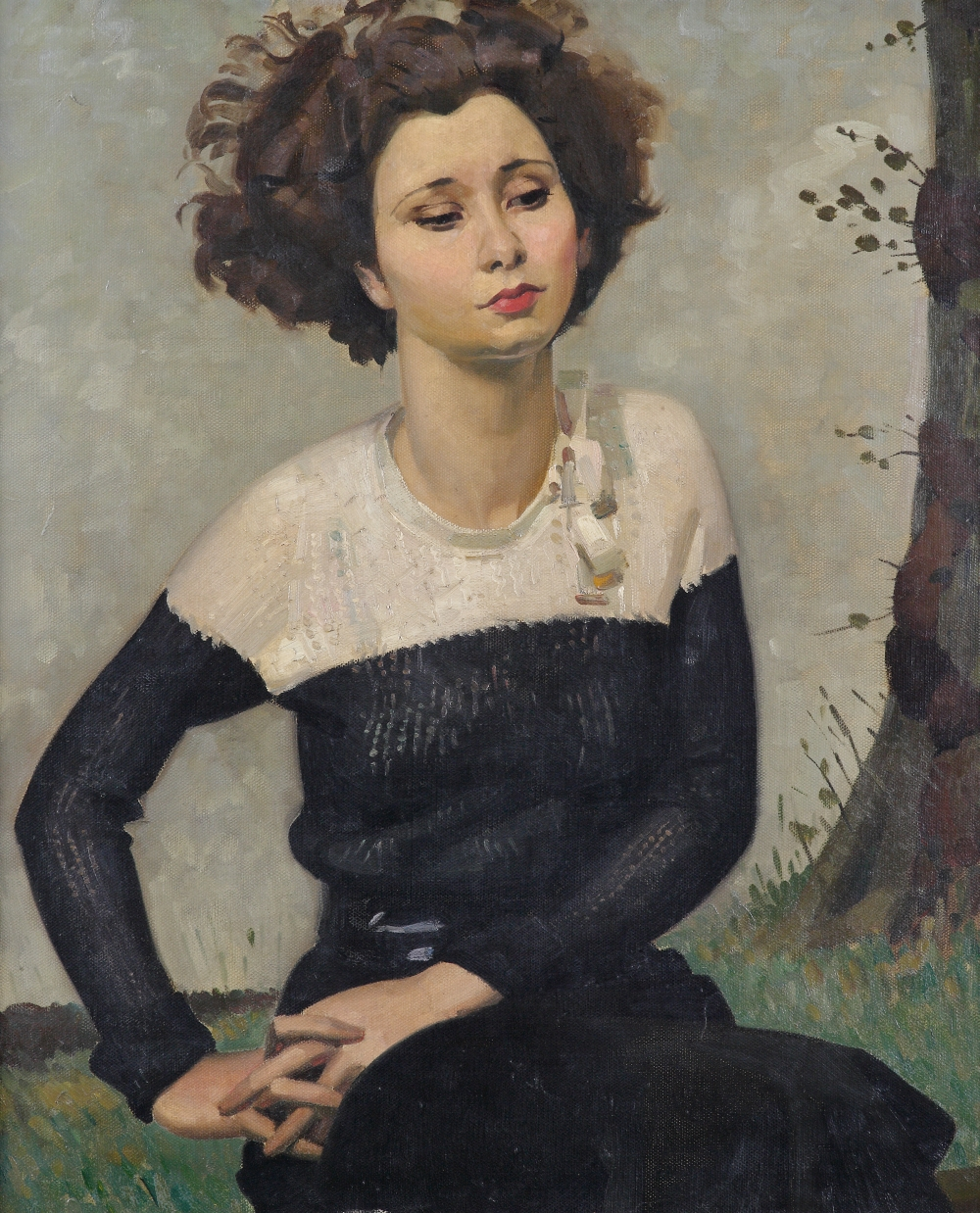
A Mulatto, 1933

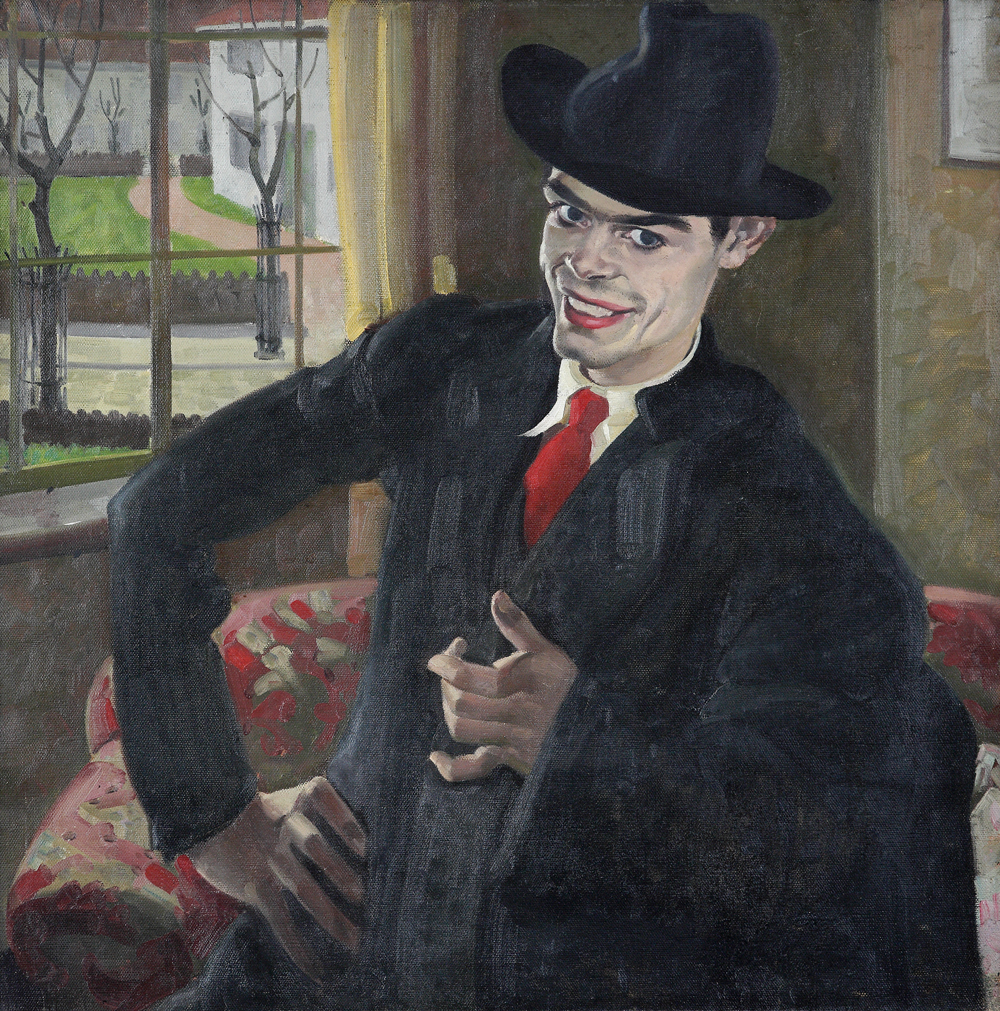
Self Portrait (Mephistopheles), 1933

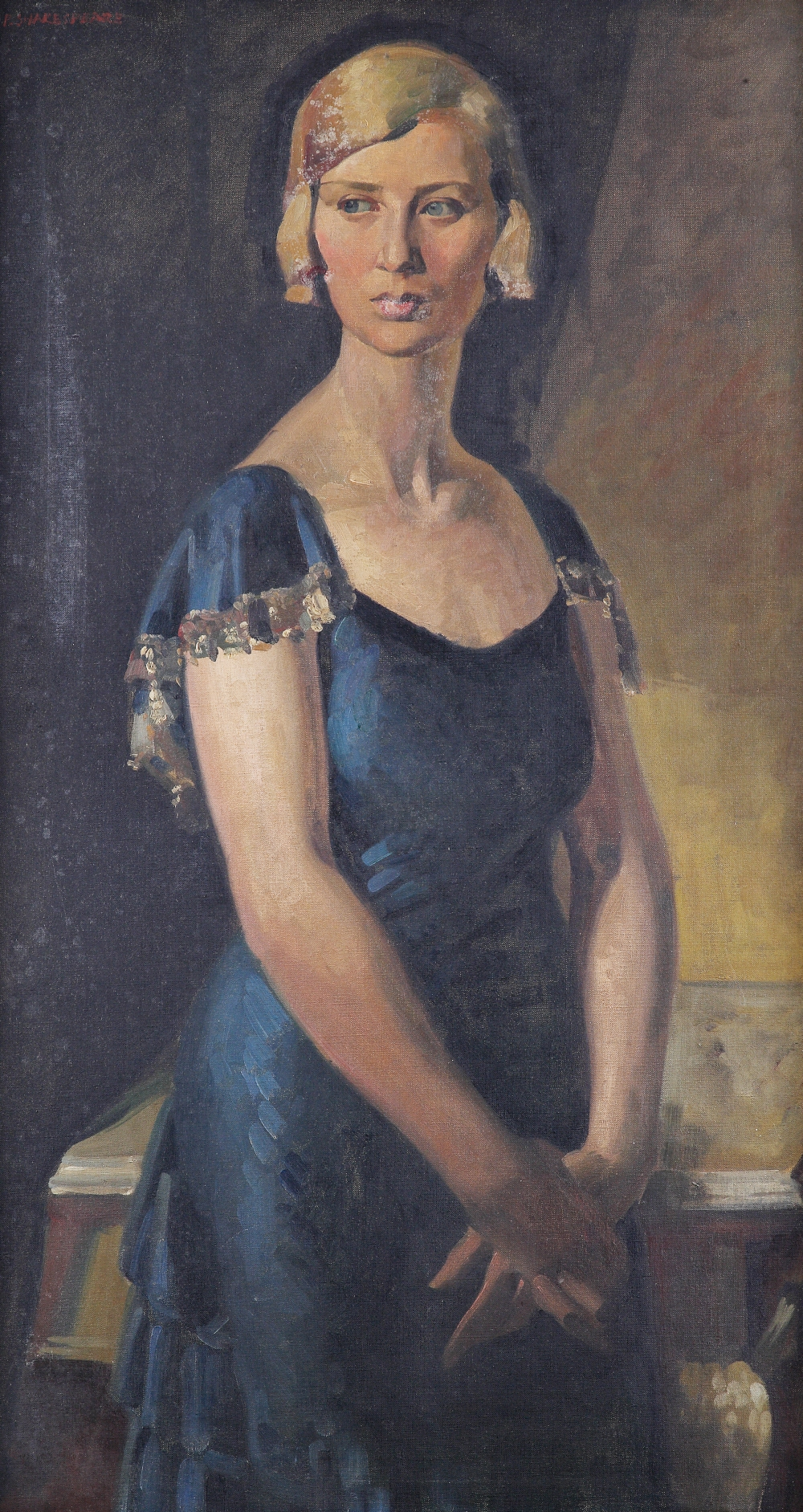
Mrs Neil Jenkins, 1933

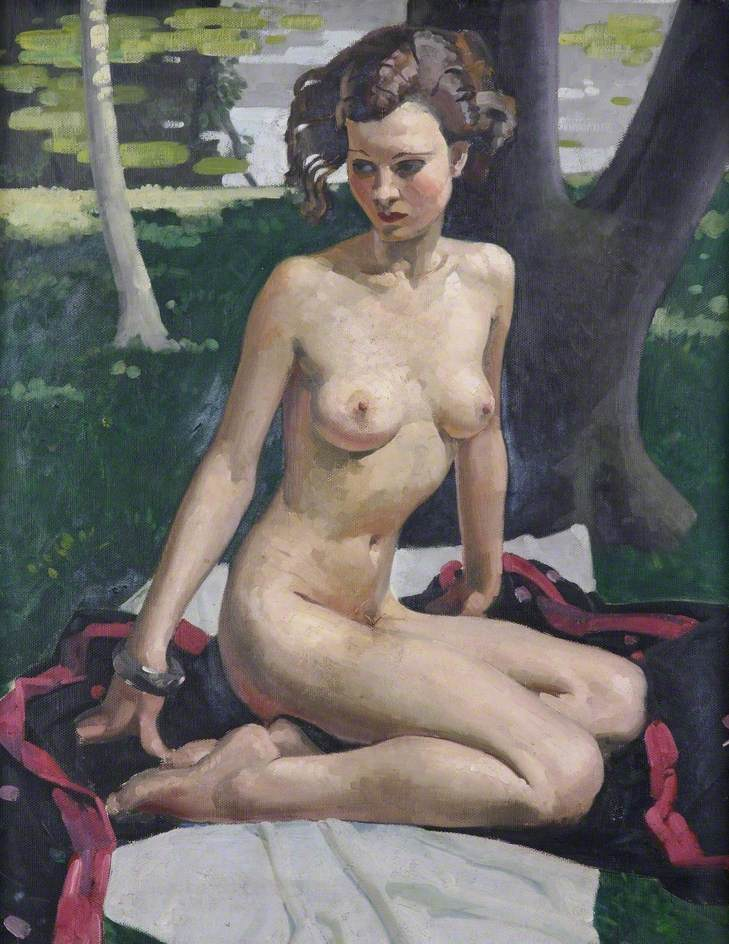
Seated nude, 1933

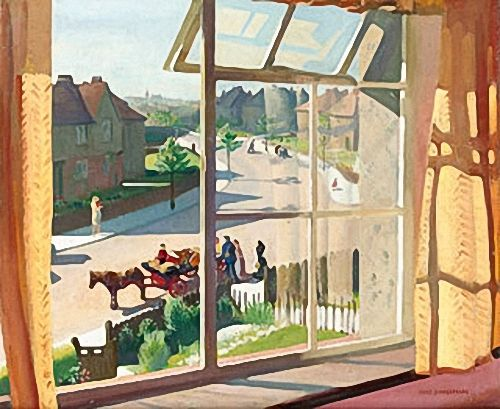
View from the artist's bedroom, c1934

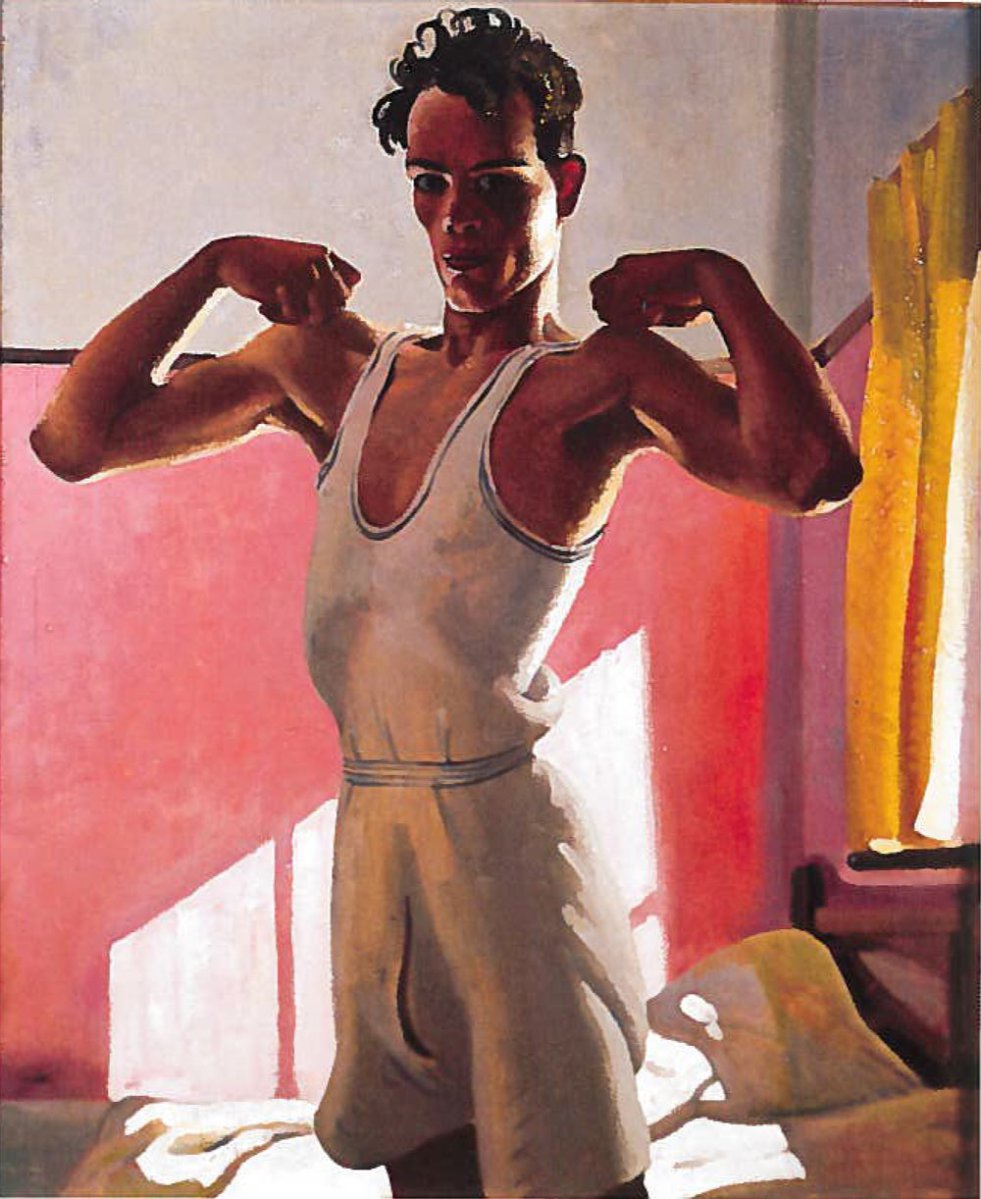
Morning Exercise, 1934

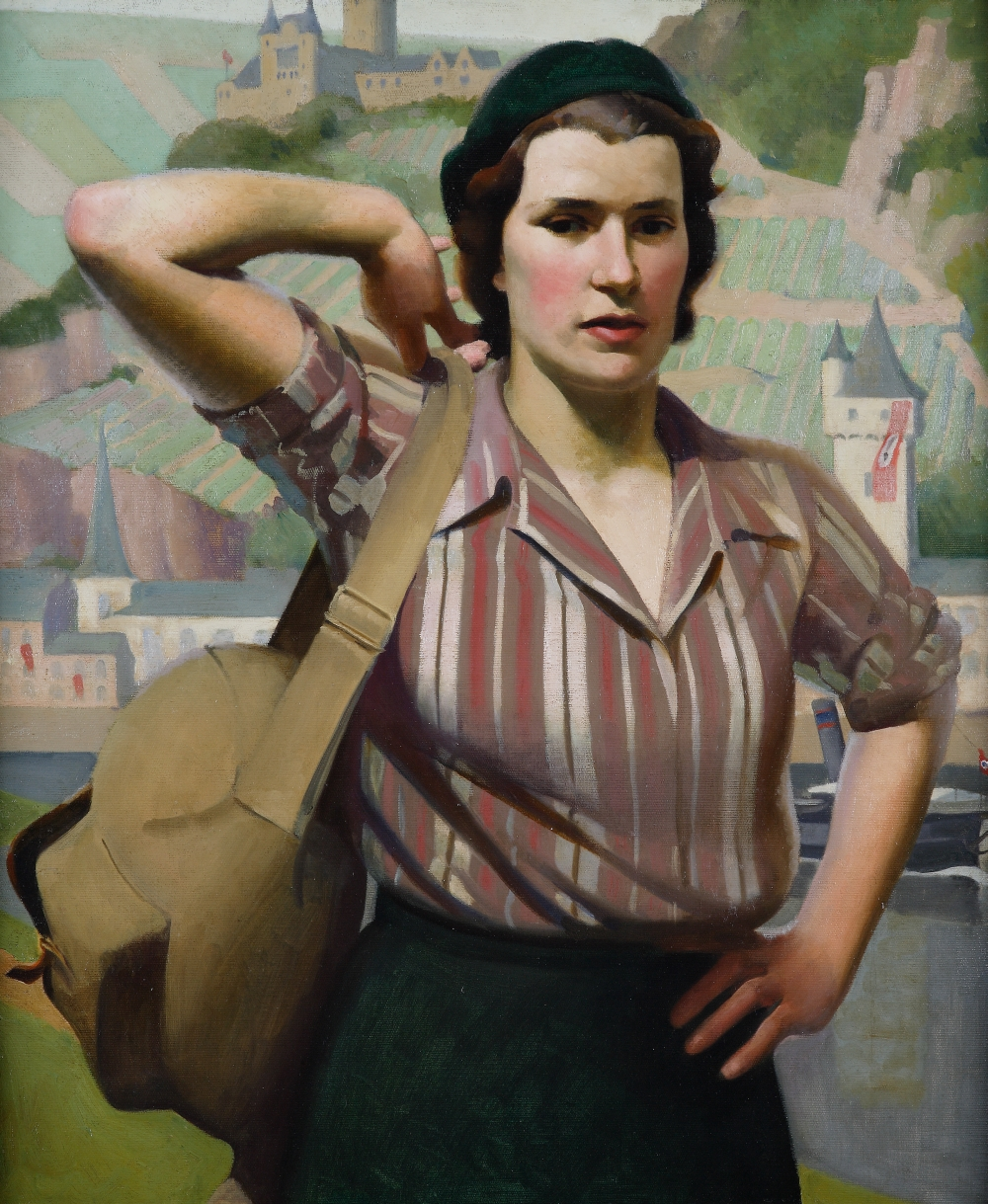
On the Rhine,1935

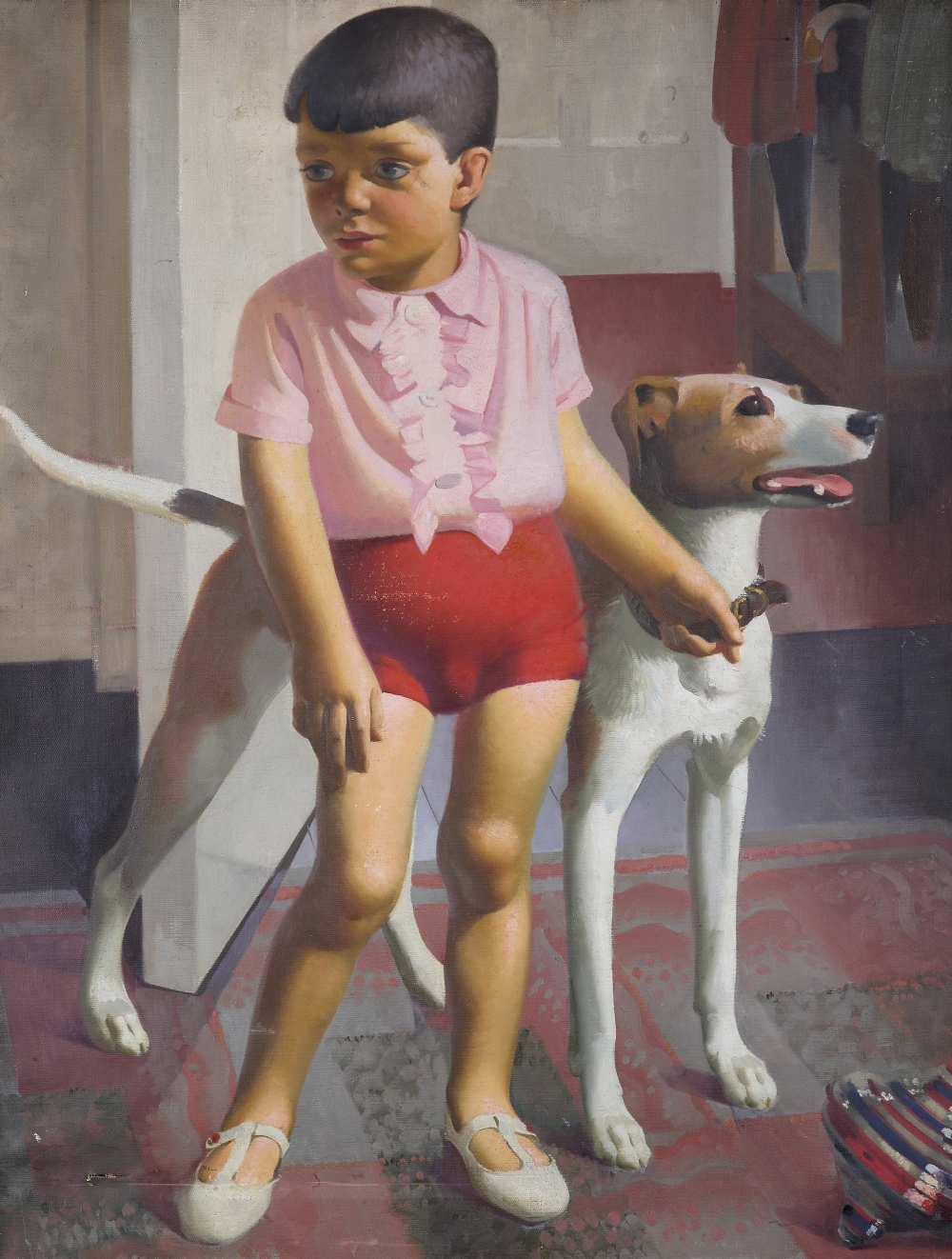
Boy and Dog, 1937

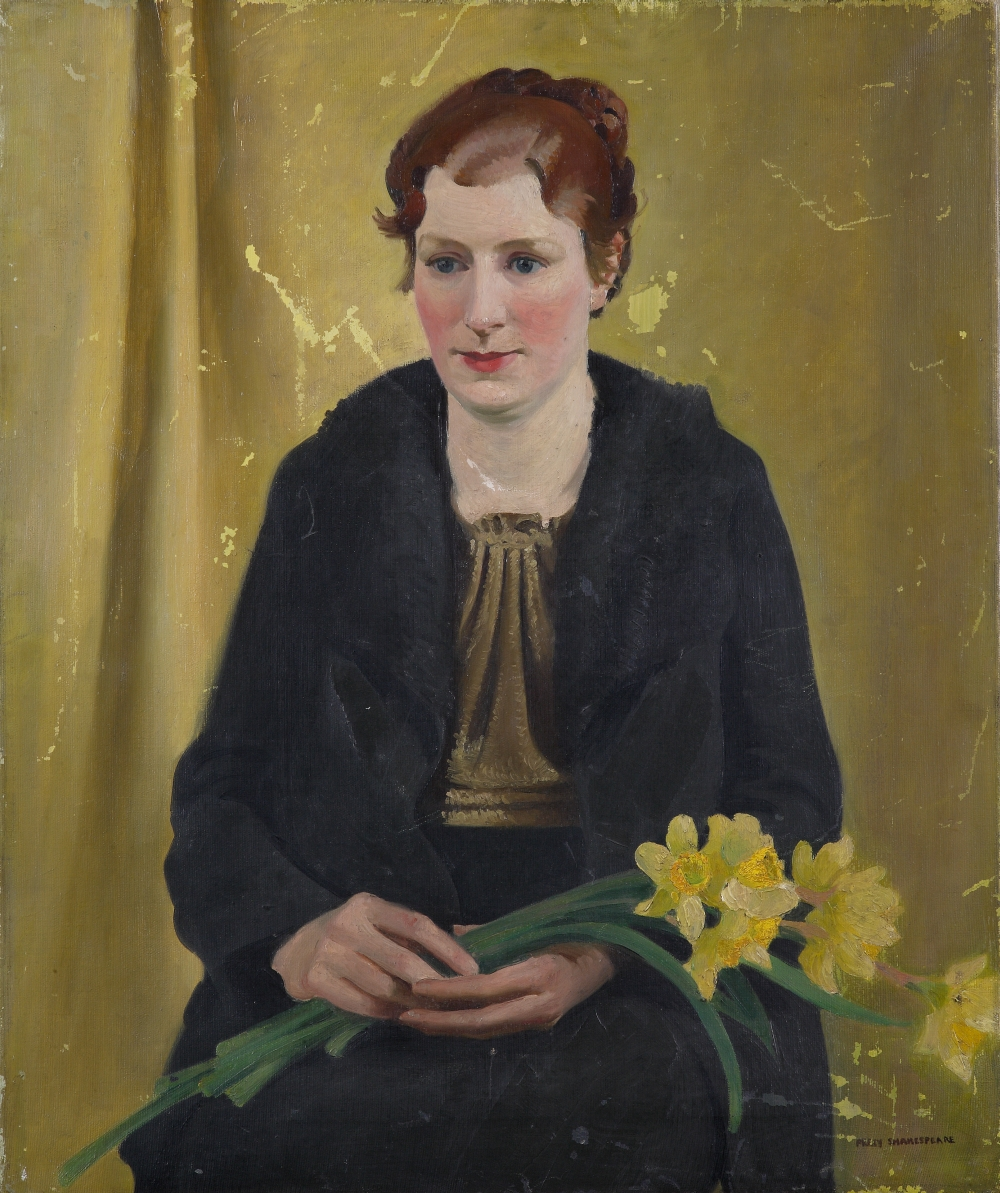
Girl with Daffodils, 1937

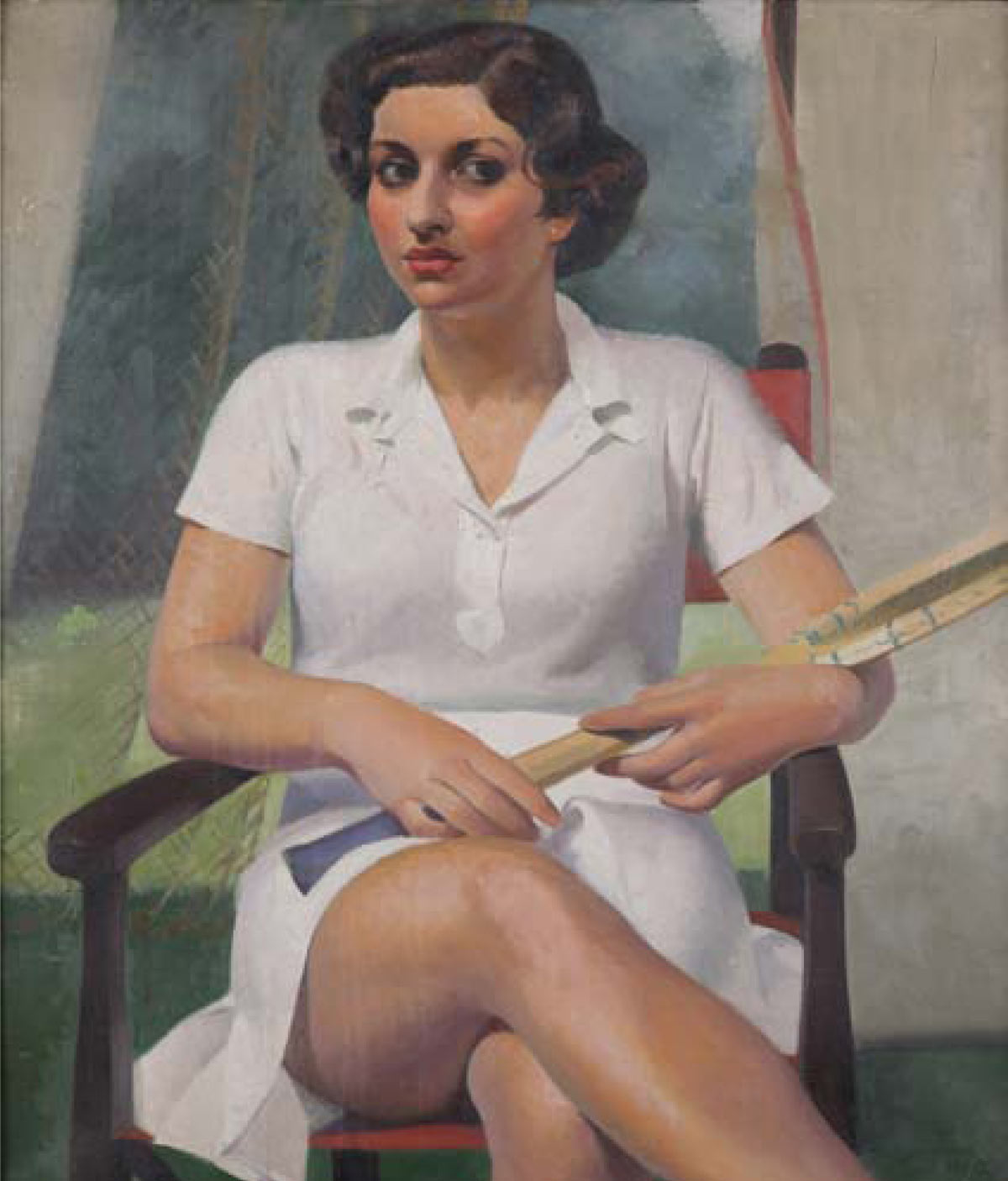
The Tennis Player, c1938

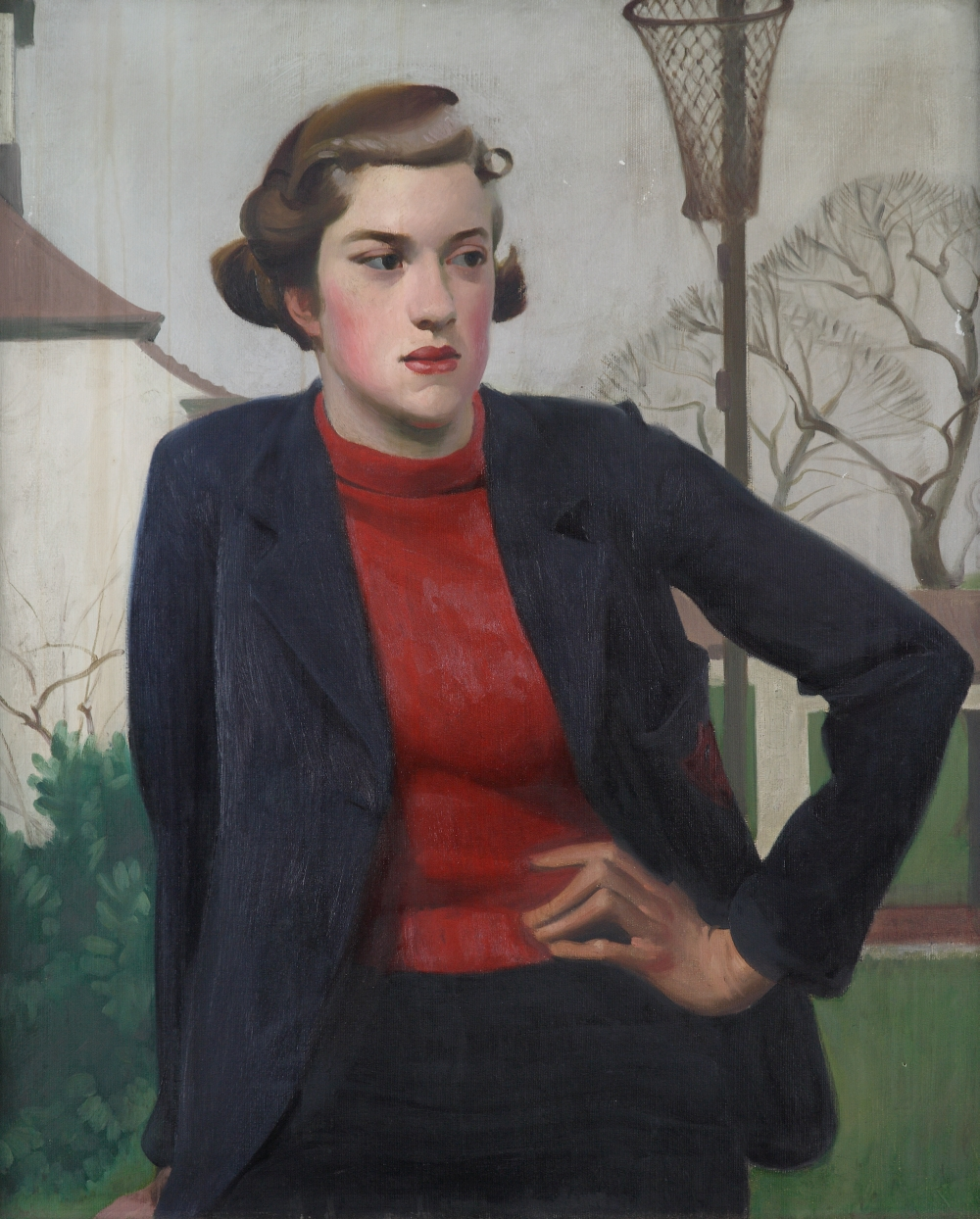
Schoolgirl, 1938

=== The Thirties at Leisure series ===
From 1936, Shakespeare embarked on a series of oil paintings showing groups of people at leisure. These compositions were the result of intense work with many preliminary drawings of the component figures. It has been noted that the drawings themselves are of considerable merit in their own right. He painted one or two of these compositions each year and submitted them to the Royal Academy and often they were accepted. They are remarkable in their colour and figure arrangements and together they present a fascinating picture of leisure activities in the period leading up the Second World War.

This series included the following works:

- The Bathing Party (1936)
- Tennis (1937)
- **The Crooner (c 1938)**
- **Afternoon at the Ice Rink (1938)**
- Seaside photographer (c1938)
- Tea Interval (at Dudley CC) (c1938)
- The Team Race (c1938)
- **The Bird House (1939)**
- **The Boat Shed (1939)**
- The Broads (1940)
- Caravanners (1941)

There were two other paintings made in Sussex during Shakespeare's war service with a stylistic relationship to this series:

- **December on the Downs (1942)**
- **The Ante Room HMS Vernon (1942)**
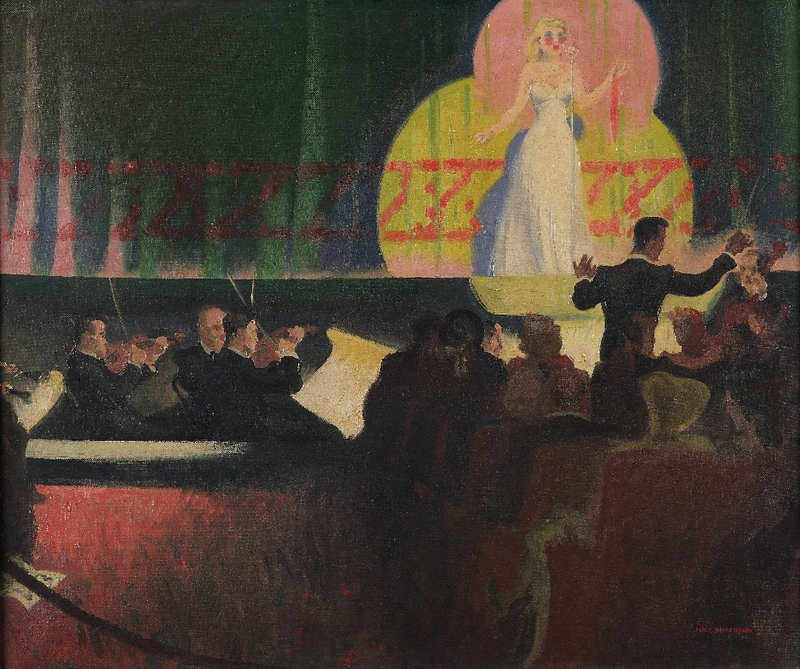
The Crooner, c 1938

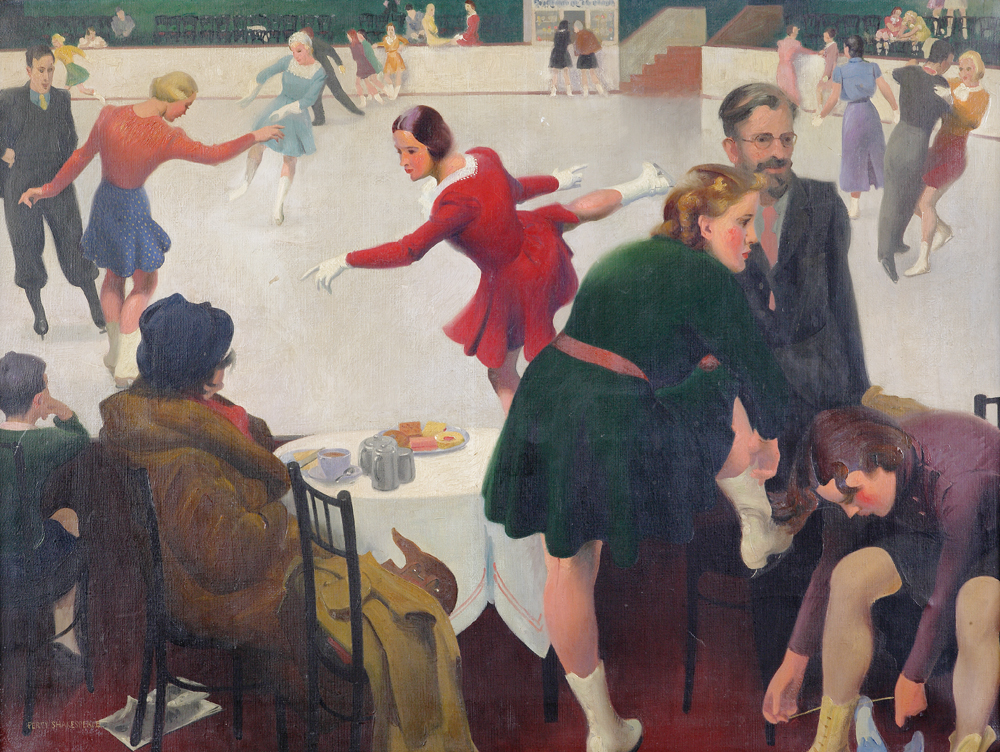
Afternoon at the Ice Rink, c1938

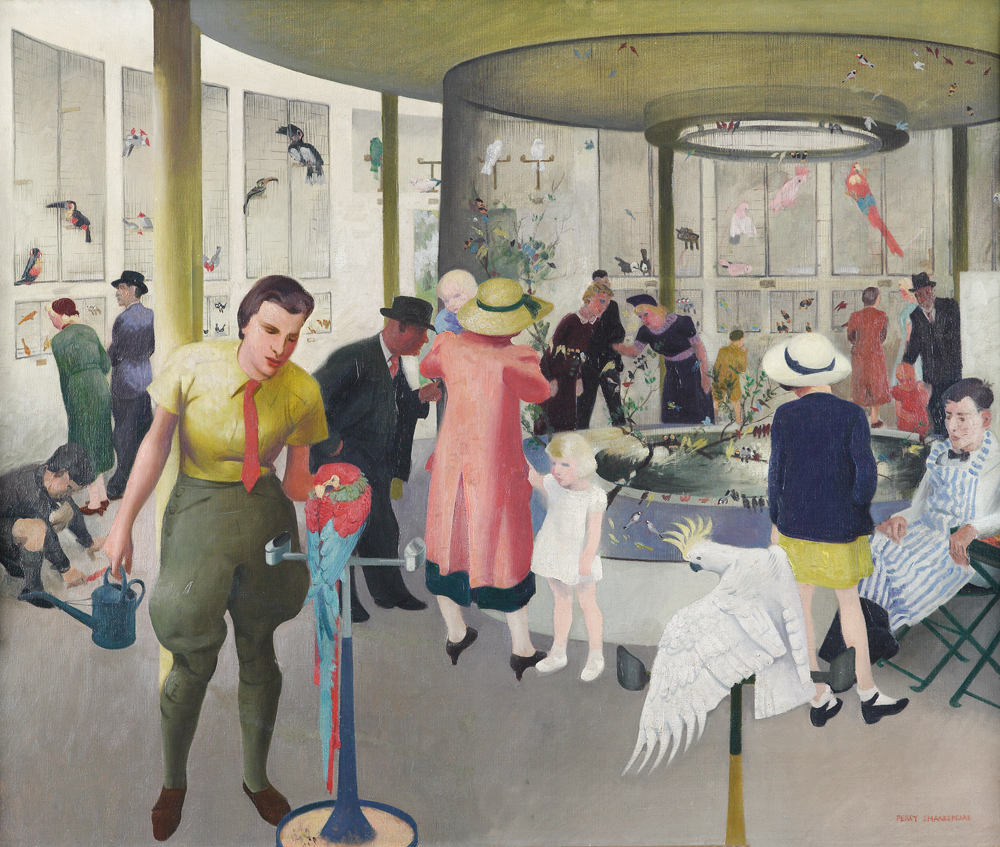
The Bird House, 1939

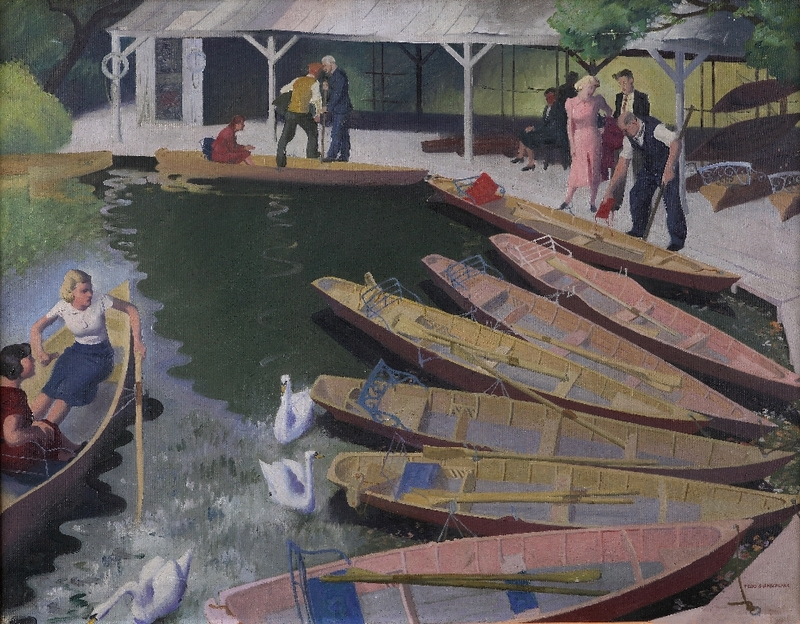
The Boat Shed, 1939

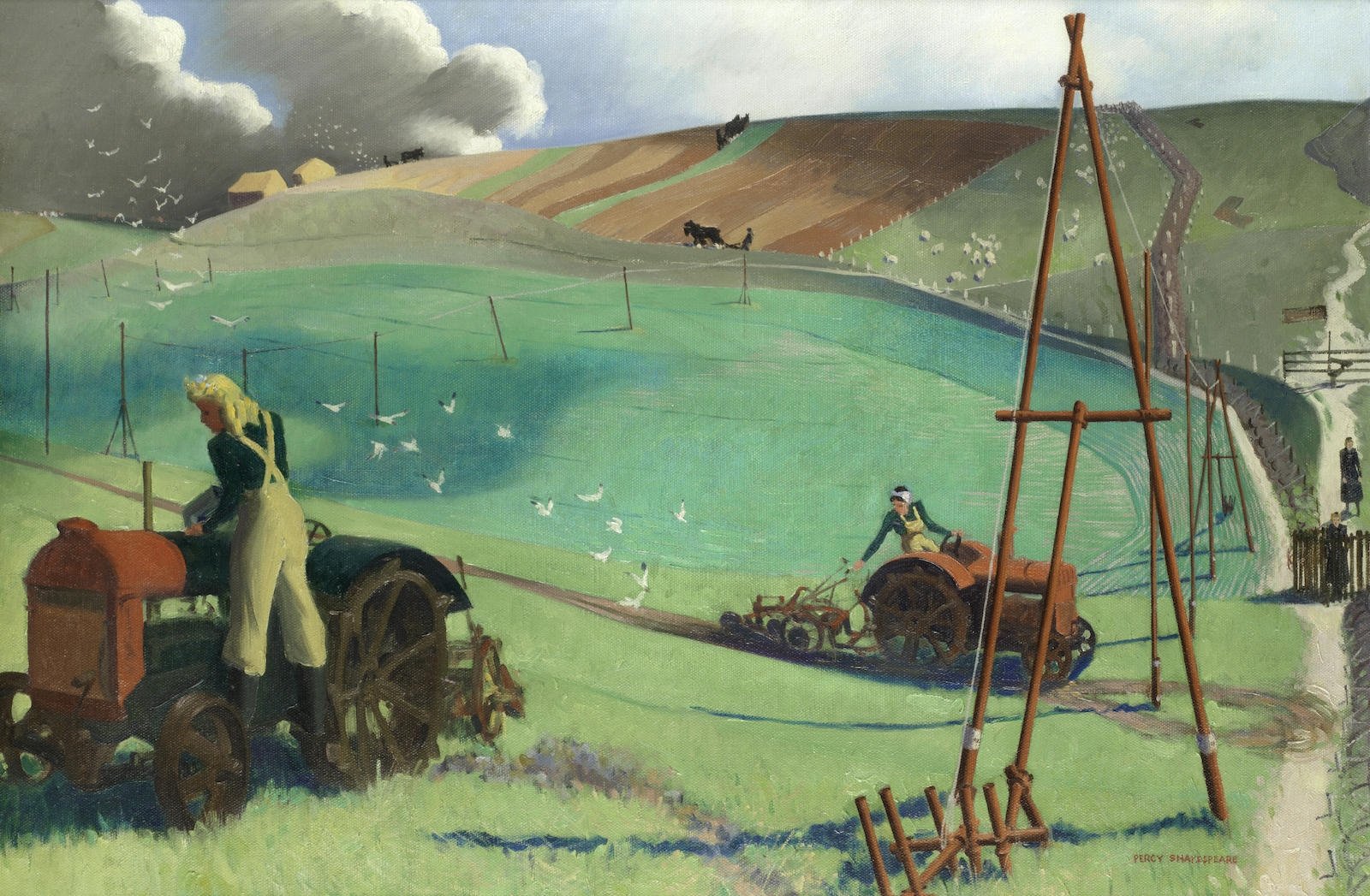
December on the Downs, 1942

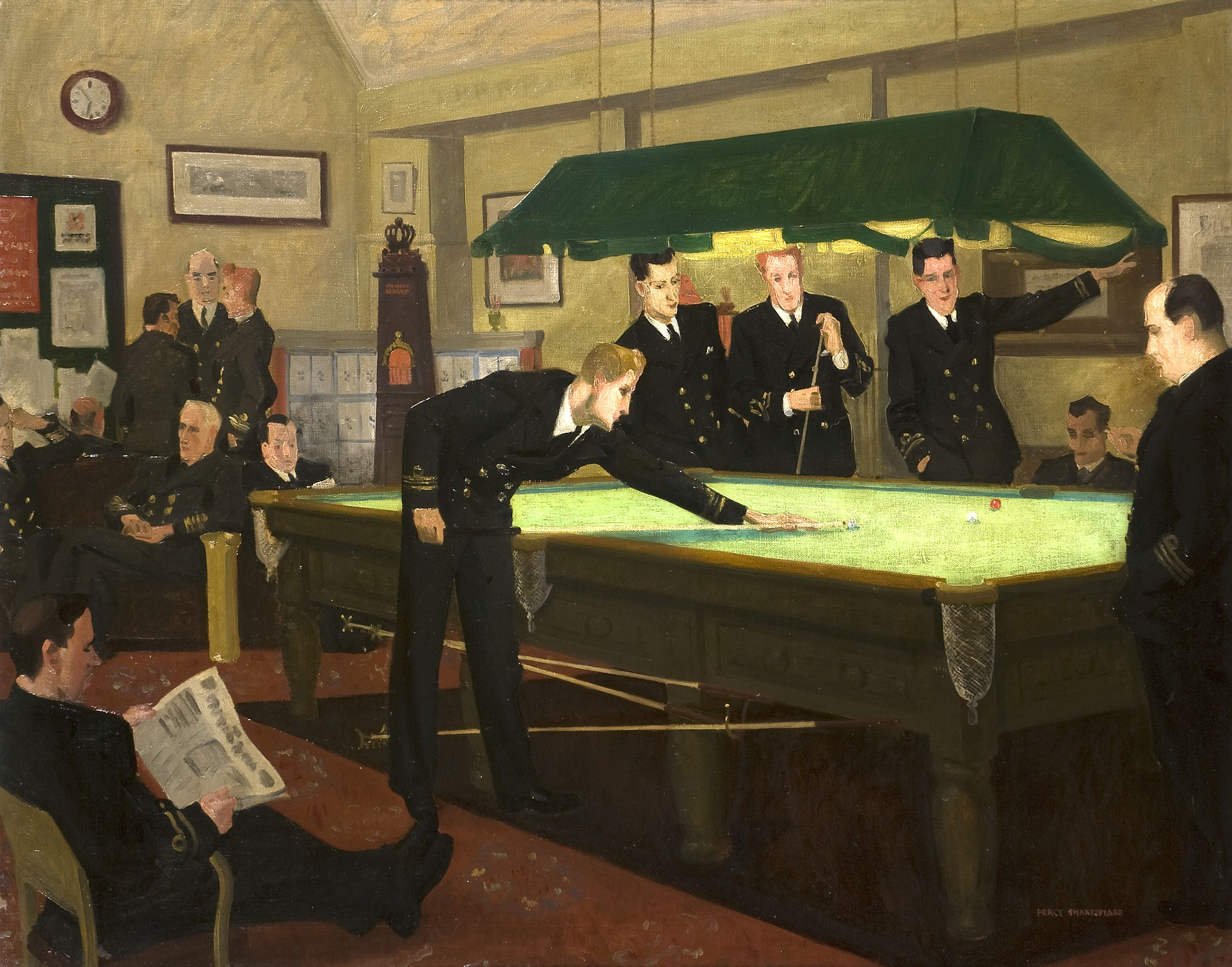
The Ante-Room, HMS Vernon, c. 1942

== Legacy ==
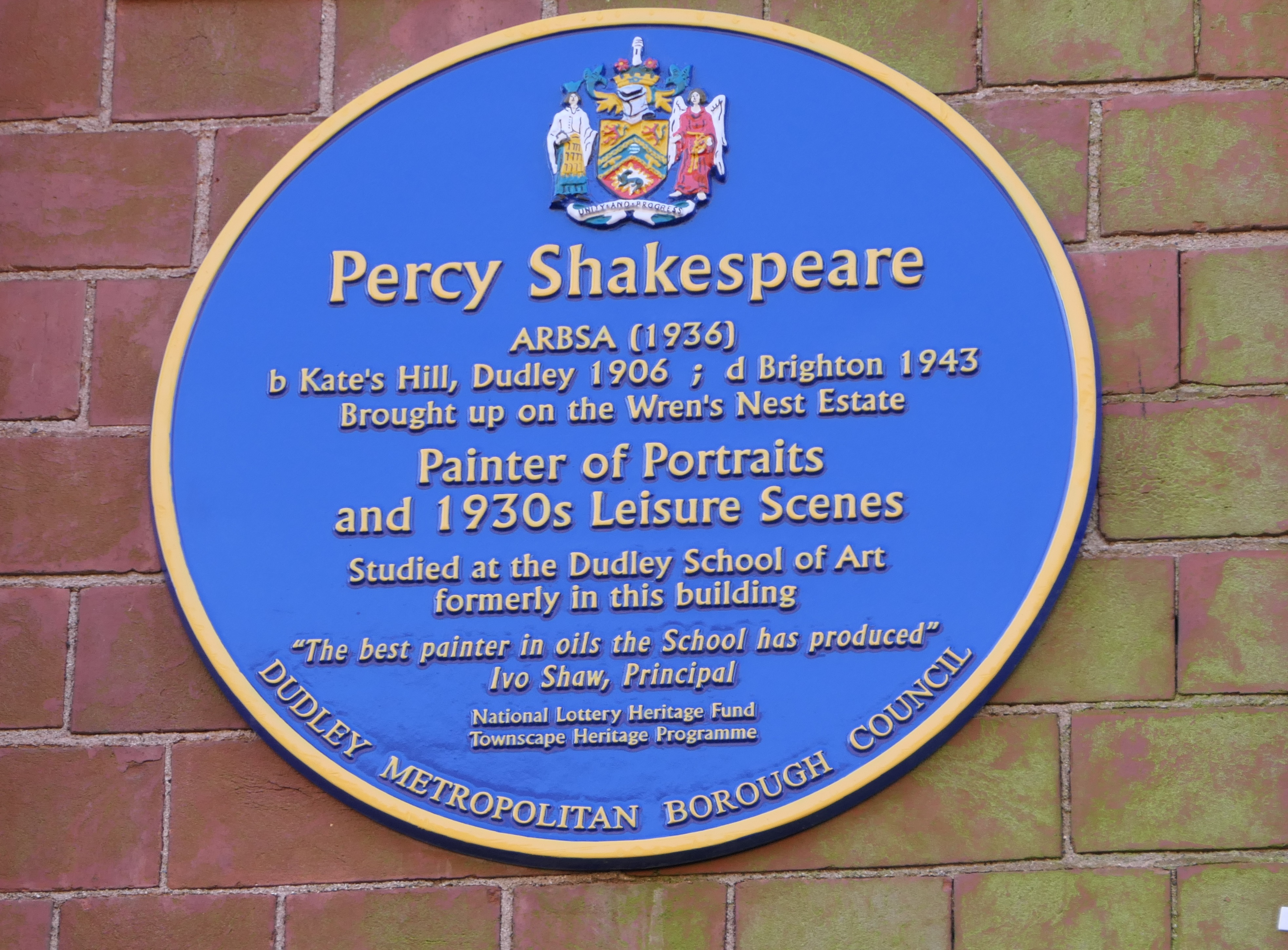
Blue Plaque on the façade of the former Dudley School of Art

In an obituary, Ivo Shaw was quoted as saying: "He was the best painter in oils the School had produced".

Many of the paintings he left behind are held by Dudley Museum at The Archives. Some are on permanent display although most are held in store.

Dudley Museum and Art Gallery mounted exhibitions of his work in 1979 and 1999 which featured both the paintings from their collection and others which were loaned from private owners.

In 2009, his work was featured in an episode of BBC TV's Flog It!.

In January 2022, a blue Plaque was unveiled on the façade of the former Dudley School of Art commemorating his life and work.
