= Dorothy Lockwood =

British artist (1910–1991)

- Born: Dorothy Smith; 1910; Birmingham, West Midlands, England
- Died: 1991 (aged 80–81)
- Education: Birmingham School of Art
- Known for: Artist

Dorothy Lockwood, née Smith, (1910–1991) was a British artist known for her watercolour paintings.

== Biography ==
Lockwood was born in Birmingham in England and would live there for the majority of her life. Lockwood, and her twin sister, studied at the Birmingham School of Art under Bernard Fleetwood-Walker. After graduating from art school, Lockwood undertook commercial work which included some designs for advertising companies. In due course she became head of design at the Cadbury Brothers company.

With her sister, Marjorie Sinclair, Lockwood wrote and illustrated a number of children's books. During her artistic career, Lockwood exhibited at the Royal Academy in London, the New English Art Club and with the Royal Society of British Artists. In 1959, Lockwood was elected a member of the Royal Birmingham Society of Artists. In 1969 she was elected an associate member of the Royal Watercolour Society and became a full member in 1974.
