= Evelin Winifred Aston =

British artist

- Born: 22 January 1891; Birmingham, England
- Died: 1975 (aged 83–84)
- Education: Birmingham School of Art
- Known for: Sculpture

Evelin Winifred Aston, later Evelin Leigh (22 January 1891 – 1975) was a British artist known for her sculptures who also painted and worked in a variety of techniques.

== Biography ==
Aston was born in Birmingham in England, one of the four children of a local housebuilder and his wife. After a private education Aston studied arts and crafts at the Birmingham School of Art where her teachers included Bernard Fleetwood-Walker and William Bloyne. During the 1920s, Aston taught modelling at a school for blind children in Birmingham while continuing to practise her art. She exhibited works at the Paris Salon, with the Royal Scottish Academy in 1934, with the Society of Women Artists throughout the 1930s and also with the Royal Birmingham Society of Artists. Aston was a frequent exhibitor with, and elected member of, the Birmingham Art Circle. Her Paris Salon exhibit, the sculpture The Adoration, was highlighted in a number of French art journals. Active as an artist into the 1950s, Aston continued to live in Birmingham throughout her life, mostly in the Erdington district of the city.
