= Eileen Blake =

British artist

Eileen Mary Blake (1878–1957) was a British painter and artist.

== Biography ==
Eileen Mary Blake was born in Moseley, a suburb of Birmingham where her father was a leather merchant. She was one of three children and attended the King Edward VI High School for Girls in the city before studying at the Birmingham School of Art, where she won several prizes. Blake painted landscapes, seascapes, flowers, portraits of children and other subjects in watercolours and also designed Christmas cards. She was an elected member of the Royal Birmingham Society of Artists and several other artist groups in the West Midlands. She also exhibited with the Royal Institute of Painters in Watercolours, the Royal Cambrian Academy and, throughout the 1930s, with the Society of Women Artists. Blake lived in her native Birmingham throughout her life.
