= Kathleen G. Stubbs =

Amateur bookbinder

Kathleen Mary Grisdale Stubbs (1884–1967) was an amateur bookbinder based in Warwickshire.

She was born to Edwin Stubbs and Adeline Wilkinson in 1884, in Hull. She had a sister, Annie Grisdale Stubbs (born 1879), also an artist, and a brother, Ernest Grisdale Stubbs (1881–1913). The Stubbs family resided at Grey Gables, a house in Solihull.

In the 1950s, Stubbs showed several fine bookbindings at exhibitions hosted by the Royal Birmingham Society of Artists. Her work was typically in the Arts and Crafts style. Her bindings feature repeated motifs such as interlocked C's or geometric honeycomb-style patterns; one (for The Rime of the Ancient Mariner) features a striking design of an albatross with its wings partially outstretched into a "V".

At some point, she trained her nephew Hugh Birkett in the art of fine bookbinding; Birkett (1919–2002), the son of Annie Stubbs and Thomas Birkett, was a furniture designer and craftsman in the Morris tradition.

Stubbs died in 1967. Several of her works are held by the British Library, and described in their bindings database.

== Titles bound by Kathleen G. Stubbs ==
- A history of Chipping Camden and Captain Robert Dover's Olympick Games, Christopher Whitfield (Windsor: Shakespeare Head Press, 1958), binding date unknown
- The immortal hour, Fiona McLeod (Birmingham: City of Birmingham School of Printing, 1939), binding date circa 1952
- Lettering of to-day, C. Geoffrey Holme (London: The Studio Limited, 1937), binding date unknown
- Rime of the Ancient Mariner, Samuel Taylor Coleridge (Birmingham: City of Birmingham School of Printing, 1940), binding date circa 1958
- The Rollright stones and the men who erected them (Birmingham: Birmingham Printers, [1926]), binding date unknown
- Syr Perecyvelle of Gales, (London: Kelmscott Press, 1895), binding date 1958
