= James Valentine Jelley =

English artist (1856–1950)

- Born: 28 May 1856; Lincoln, England
- Died: 28 May 1950 (aged 94); Knowle, England
- Occupation: Painter
- Employer: Birmingham School of Art
- Spouses: Esther Louisa Langford; Edith Mary Brock
- Children: John Valentine Jelley; Edith Mary Jelley; Harold Jelley

James Valentine Jelley (1856–1950) was an English artist who was an employee of the Birmingham School of Art and a member of the Royal Birmingham Society of Artists and served as its president from 1932 to 1935.

== Biography ==
Valentine was born on 28 May 1856 in Lincoln to John James Jelley, a grocer's assistant and Mary Ann Jelley (née Hubbard). James was married to Esther Louisa Langford on 6 December 1884 at the Church of St Nicholas, Warwick. Esther Louisa died on 17 July 1916 at the age of 64 and in 1917, Jelley was remarried to Edith Mary Brock, who like her husband exhibited at the Royal Birmingham Society of Artists. He worked at the Birmingham School of Art for 40 years.

Jelley had 3 known children: Harold Lyne Jelley (1886), a jeweller; John Valentine Jelley, a physicist; Edith Mary Prout Jelley, whose married name was Thornton.

Jelley died on 28 May 1950 – his 94th birthday – in Knowle.

== Art ==
Jelley was described as a "prolific painter" who exhibited works that "show a wide range of subjects – everything except portraits".
