= James Priddey =

English painter (1916–1980)

James Priddey, RBSA, PPRBSA, FRSA, (19 April 1916 – 10 November 1980) was an English painter, printmaker, illustrator and member of the Royal Birmingham Society of Artists.

== Life and work ==
James Priddey was born at Handsworth, Birmingham in 1916. He studied at Moseley School of Arts and Crafts, and at Birmingham College of Art between 1931 and 1935. Priddey exhibited widely including at the Royal Scottish Academy, Royal Society of British Artists, Royal Cambrian Academy, Royal West of England Academy, Society of Graphic Art, in the provinces and at the Paris Salon where he received a silver medal in 1949. He was elected as president to the Birmingham Watercolour Society in 1959 and a member to the Royal Birmingham Society of Artists in 1960, becoming the Society's Hon. Secretary in 1966. Priddey lived and worked in Harborne, Birmingham with his wife Peggy. Between 1974 and 1978 Priddey was elected as the president of the Royal Birmingham Society of Artists.

Priddey had several styles, all unmistakably his own. He produced hundreds of black and white line illustrations for books and pamphlets such as the 1973 publication Heart of England, a guide to the Midlands region which he illustrated throughout, with accompanying text by Louise Wright. Towns, villages, rural scenes and some fine Black Country landscapes filled its pages, while a watercolour, very different in style but equally beautiful, graced the dustjacket.

James Priddey died on 10 November 1980. He lived at 22 Fellows Lane in Harborne, Birmingham at the time of his death.

== Exhibitions ==
In the 1963 Autumn exhibition at the RBSA, two of Priddley's works were displayed in their own gallery, Mussel Boats at Conway and Trouveau – the Arrester. In 1967 Priddey exhibited the etching Cooling Towers, Salford Bridge at the Royal Academy of Art in London. In 2013 Priddey's etched copperplate of Christchurch Passage and the Hand Coloured etching of Christchurch Passage were exhibited in Birmingham, RBSA Gallery as part of the exhibition RBSA: Our Collection, Our Archive and You.

== Partial bibliography ==
Illustrations for Books:

- Heart of England (1973) (Written by Louise Wright)
- Cotswold Heritage (1977) (Written by Louise Wright)
