= Tammaryn Lashley =

British neuroscientist

Tammaryn Claire Lashley
- Born: Redditch
- Education: University College London; University of Wales Swansea
- Scientific career
- Workplaces: University College London
- Thesis: BRI2 gene-related dementias : a morphological and biochemical study (2006)

Tammaryn Lashley (née Johnson) is a British neuroscientist specialising in neurodegenerative diseases who is a professor at the Queen Square Institute of Neurology. She is known for her research on the pathological mechanisms underlying neurodegenerative diseases, particularly Alzheimer's disease and frontotemporal lobar degeneration. Lashley led the Queen Square Brain Bank, one of the United Kingdom’s major centres for post‑mortem brain donation and neuropathological investigation.

== Early life and education ==
Lashley is from Redditch and attended Trinity High School. She completed her bachelor's degree in biochemistry at the University of Wales. Lashley worked in a lab at the National Institute for Medical Research, but thought that she could not start a PhD because of her undergraduate grades. She later joined University College London as a research technician. She started a doctorate, researching gene-related dementias. She completed her doctoral research part time while running the Queen Square Brain Bank histologies and having two children. She was eventually awarded an Alzheimer's Research UK Fellowship and launched her independent scientific career.

== Research and career ==
Lashley is interested in frontotemporal lobar degenerations, a group of dementias characterised by the accumulation of several abnormal proteins. She examines the relationship between neuropathological changes and clinical presentation. By comparing post‑mortem brain tissue with detailed patient histories, Lashley aims to improve diagnostic accuracy for future patients. She uses post‑mortem human brain tissue to study morphological changes in neurodegenerative diseases and to develop potential biomarkers for earlier and more accurate diagnosis.

Frontotemporal dementia is the second most common cause of early‑onset dementia after Alzheimer's disease. Frontotemporal dementia is characterised by the degeneration of nerve cells in the frontal and temporal lobes, accompanied by abnormal protein inclusions within affected cells. Lashley found that proteins responsible for transporting molecular messages between the nucleus and cytoplasm undergo altered localisation in frontotemporal dementia, which influences the formation of pathological abnormalities. Her research indicates that disrupted movement of multiple proteins (not only those found in characteristic inclusions) may contribute to disease mechanisms.

Lashley previously served as co‑chair of the UCL Alzheimer’s Research UK Network. In 2019, Lashley was made Director of the Queen Square Brain Bank. She has advocated for people to donate their brains to science, to help researchers better understand neurological disease. In 2020, she was promoted to Professor of Neuroscience.

== Academic service ==
Lashley has delivered public lectures on dementia research, participated in interdisciplinary events such as Silvering the Cerebrum, and appeared on the Victoria Derbyshire Show.

== Selected publications ==
- Rita Guerreiro; Aleksandra Wojtas; Jose Bras; et al. (10 January 2013). "TREM2 variants in Alzheimer's disease". The New England Journal of Medicine. 368 (2): 117–127. doi:10.1056/nejmoa1211851. ISSN 0028-4793. PMC 3631573. PMID 23150934. Wikidata Q22250873.
- Li JY; Englund E; Holton JL; et al. (May 2008). "Lewy bodies in grafted neurons in subjects with Parkinson's disease suggest host-to-graft disease propagation". Nature medicine. 14 (5): 501–3. doi:10.1038/nm1746. ISSN 1078-8956. PMID 18391963. Wikidata Q29615640.
- Yang Shi; Wenjuan Zhang; Yang Yang; et al. (29 September 2021). "Structure-based classification of tauopathies". Nature. 598 (7880): 359–363. Bibcode:2021Natur.598..359S. doi:10.1038/s41586-021-03911-7. ISSN 1476-4687. PMC 7611841. PMID 34588692. Wikidata Q112598741.
