= Mabel Greenberg =

British artist (1889–1933)

- Born: Mabel Billah Greenberg; 1899; Birmingham, England
- Died: 30 September 1933 (aged 33–34); London, England
- Education: Birmingham Municipal School of Art; Slade School of Art
- Occupation: Artist

Mabel Billah Greenberg (1889 – 30 September 1933) was a British artist.

== Early life ==
She was born in Birmingham, England, and was well known in Birmingham and in London. She was the daughter of Israel and Miriam Greenberg of Edgbaston, Birmingham. Israel Greenberg was a jeweller, trading as I.S. Greenberg & Co in Birmingham's Jewellery Quarter.

Greenberg studied at Birmingham Municipal School of Art and the Slade School of Art. Two of her works were shown in Slade student exhibitions: Study of a Young Man won first prize for Head Drawing in 1918, and Male Figure Standing won the Second Prize for Figure Painting in 1919 and remains in the UCL Art Museum.

== Works ==
Three of Greenberg's paintings are in UK collections:

- Male Figure Standing 1919, UCL Art Museum
- Helen pre 1931, Laing Art Gallery, Newcastle
- The Matriarch 1930, Birmingham Museum and Art Gallery

Other works reported in national and regional press as shown at various exhibitions include:

- Pictures by MG, RSA Spring Exhibition
- A delightful portrait by MBG, Nottingham Castle Exhibition
- P.C. Spratt, Royal Society of Portrait Painters
- Helen, and The Doll, Royal Institute of Portrait Painters in Water Colour
- Summer Day, Royal Academy Annual Exhibition
- Lisette, Society of Women Artists
- Mention, no details, Birmingham Group exhibition in London
- The Matriarch, and Rita, Royal Society of British Artists at Derby
- Portrait, and Tiger Lilies, Women Artists of the Midlands

Press references mention a second portrait of Helene (Helen) Hedin, and with a photograph of Greenberg at work, to a portrait of the actor John Stuart.

== Death ==
Mabel Greenberg died in London on 30 September 1933 and was buried at Witton Jewish Cemetery in Birmingham.
