= Birmingham School of Art building =

Building by J. H. Chamberlain

Birmingham School of Art
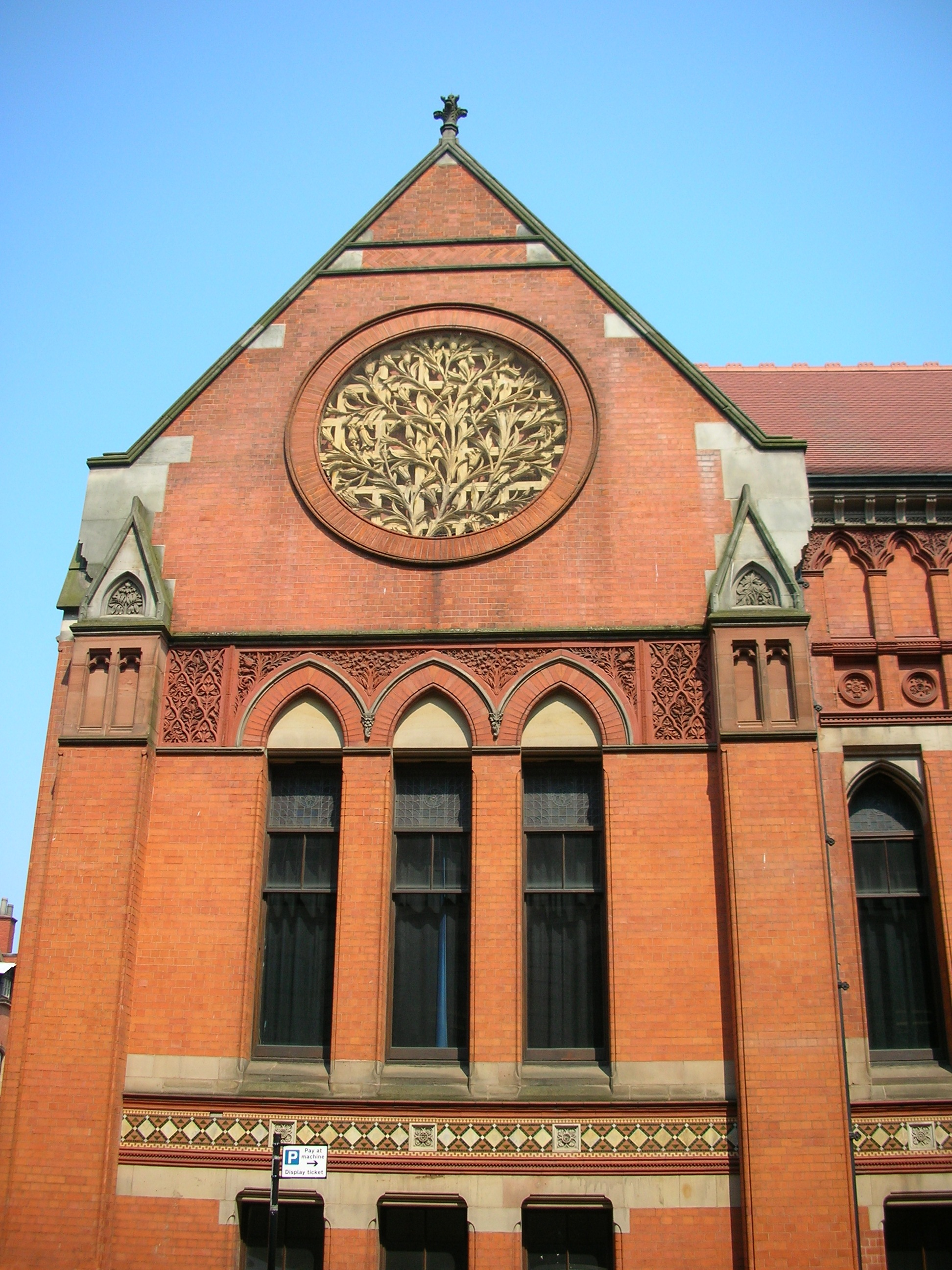
- Birmingham School of Art rose

General information
- Architectural style: Gothic Revival
- Coordinates: 52.481128°N 1.903363°W
- Year built: 1884-1885
- Groundbreaking: May 31 1884
- Construction started: May 31 1884
- Opened: September 1885
- Cost: £21,254

Design and construction
- Architect: John Henry Chamberlain

The Birmingham School of Art building was designed for the school of art by architect John Henry Chamberlain from January 1882 until October 1883, and was built from May 31 1884 until its opening in September 1885.

== Funding ==
The building cost £21,254, and was sponsored by donations from the Tangye brothers (£10,937) and Louisa Ryland (£10,000). The site was given from the Newhall estate by William Barwick Cregoe Colmore.

== Architecture ==
It is a red-brick Victorian Gothic structure, completed after its architect J. H. Chamberlain's death by his partner William Martin and his son Frederick Martin, and widely considered as Chamberlain's masterpiece. Its Venetian style and naturalistic decoration are heavily influenced by John Ruskin's Stones of Venice.

A continuous plinth band of Doultons tilework containing lozenges lilies and sunflowers on blue backgrounds runs around the building. The original iron railings were made by Hart & Co..

== History ==
The foundation stone was laid on 31 May 1884 and the building was opened in September 1885.

An extension from the north end, running east along Cornwall Street was added by Martin & Chamberlain in 1892–93.

In 1992, the cleaning of the exterior was completed after two years and the refurbishment and renovation of the interior began in 1993, ending in 1996. The work was undertaken by Associated Architects following completion of the Birmingham School of Jewellery also for Birmingham City University.
