= Geoffrey Edmunds =

English cricketer

Personal information
- Full name: Geoffrey Edmunds
- Born: 2 September 1954 (age 72); Stoneleigh, Warwickshire, England
- Batting: Right-handed
- Bowling: Slow left-arm orthodox

Domestic team information
- Years: Team
- 1987–2003: Shropshire

Career statistics
Competition	List A
Matches	5
Runs scored	27
Batting average	27.00
100s/50s	–/–
Top score	24*
Balls bowled	312
Wickets	2
Bowling average	104.50
5 wickets in innings	–
10 wickets in match	–
Best bowling	1/41
Catches/stumpings	–/–
- Source: Cricinfo, 3 July 2011

Geoffrey Edmunds (born 2 September 1954) is an English cricketer. Edmunds was a right-handed batsman who bowled slow left-arm orthodox. He was born in Stoneleigh, Warwickshire and educated at Abbey High School, Redditch.

Edmunds made his debut for Shropshire in the 1986 Minor Counties Championship against Cheshire. Edmunds played Minor counties cricket for Shropshire from 1986 to 1993, which included 66 Minor Counties Championship appearances and 10 MCCA Knockout Trophy appearances. He made his List A debut against Hampshire in the 1988 NatWest Trophy. He made 4 further List A appearances, the last of which came against Somerset in 1993 NatWest Trophy. In his 8 List A matches, he scored 27 runs at with a high score of 24 not out. With the ball, he took 2 wickets at an average of 104.50, with best figures of 1/41. He also played county cricket below first-class in the Warwickshire Second Eleven team.

Edmunds once played a game against Israel as a friendly for the ICC World Cup Qualifiers in 1979, scoring 15 runs and taking a wicket.

Edmunds, previously a player at Coventry and North Warwickshire Cricket Club, now plays for Kenilworth Cricket Club where is also chairman of the club.
