= Fay Pomerance =

English painter (1912-2001)

- Born: Fay Levy; 12 July 1912; Birmingham, England
- Died: 2001 (aged 88–89)
- Known for: Painting
- Spouse: Ben Pomerance (m.1936)

Fay Pomerance née Levy (12 July 1912 – 2001) was a British artist known for her paintings in pastel, tempera and in watercolours which were often on religious and spiritual subjects.

== Biography ==
Pomerance was born in Birmingham and studied at the Birmingham College of Art from 1928 to 1933. After graduation, Pomerance worked as a freelance commercial artist but also began exhibiting in group shows, most notably with the Sheffield Society of Artists of which she became a member. Her first solo exhibition was at the Walker Art Gallery in Liverpool in 1949. Further solo shows followed including at the Ben Uri Gallery, at the Leicester Galleries and also at the Molton and Redfern galleries. In July 1952 she exhibited at the Archer Gallery in Kensington, London. In 1962 and 1963 she had solo shows at the Sheffield University Library Gallery and the Laing Art Gallery in Newcastle upon Tyne respectively. Notable works by Pomerance include The Sphere of Redemption cycle panels. She designed a stained glass window, Rebirth of the State of Israel, for the Singers Hill Synagogue in Birmingham. She displayed her ballet themes at Bristol Old Vic as part of the 21st anniversary celebrations of the Dementia Care Trust. Other exhibitions were held at the church of St Botolph without Aldgate, St James's Church, Piccadilly during the 1983 Piccadilly Festival, Nottingham Playhouse and at Crucible Theatre Sheffield.

A retrospective exhibition of her work was held at St Mary's College, Durham in 1999 and a memorial exhibition, The Theme of Redemption, was held at Durham Cathedral in 2004. A similar exhibition was held in Durham during 2018 at Ushaw College. Works by Pomerance are held by a number of museums in Israel and in Britain by the Ben Uri Gallery, the Batley Art Gallery and by both Hull and Staffordshire local authorities.

Pomerance's work differed from the mainstream of post-war British art. Throughout her life, she experienced spiritual visions which formed the basis of her dreamlike iconography and complex expressions. She explored and developed intense themes through her works such as War Vision, a powerful watercolour series that depicts themes of carnage, genocide, oppression and homelessness.

== Personal life ==
Pomerance's father was Sol Levy, the founder of the Scala Cinema chain. In 1936 she married Ben Pomerance, who became vice-chairman of the furniture firm Waring & Gillow. During her life she travelled extensively in Europe, notably to Scandinavia and also made several trips to Israel. For many years Pomerance lived in Sheffield but spent her later years in Bristol.
