= Marjorie Incledon =

British artist (1891-1973)

- Born: Marjorie May Incledon; 1891; Bromsgrove, Worcestershire, England
- Died: 1973 (aged 81–82); Eastbourne, England
- Education: Birmingham School of Art; Central School of Art and Crafts; Brighton College of Art
- Known for: Painting, stained glass design

Marjorie May Incledon (1891–1973) was a British artist, notable as a painter and stained glass artist.

== Biography ==
Incledon was born in Bromsgrove and educated at Berkhamsted Grammar School. She was a first cousin of J. R. R. Tolkien. From 1911 to 1914, she studied at the Birmingham School of Art and then, during 1917 and 1918 at the Central School of Art and Crafts in London. In 1941, Incledon returned to the Birmingham School of Art as a student for a year before studying at the Brighton College of Art until 1945.

Incledon remained based in Sussex throughout her life, living at Rottingdean and then at Ditchling, and producing paintings and stained glass designs of landscapes and still life subjects. She exhibited works on a regular basis at the Royal Academy in London from 1945 to 1957, with the Society of Women Artists throughout the 1950s and also with the Royal Society of British Artists and the Royal Institute of Oil Painters. She was an elected member of the Sussex Women's Art Club and was active in the Brighton United Artists group. Incledon died at Eastbourne in 1973.
