= Harold Holden =

English artist

Harold Henry Holden RWS, ARCA (Lond.)
- Born: Harold Henry Holden; 7 December 1885; Settle, Yorkshire
- Died: 19 April 1977 (aged 91); Coombe Dingle, Bristol, England
- Resting place: Bristol
- Occupations: Artist; Teacher
- Organizations: Leeds School of Art; Birmingham School of Art
- Spouse: Elizabeth Holden
- Children: 4 sons, John, Geoffrey, Douglas and George

Harold Herbert Holden RWS, ARCA (Lond.) (7 December 1885 – 19 April 1977) was an English artist from Birmingham, active in the mid-20th century.

He was principal of the Leeds School of Art, then in the late 1920s and 1930s, of Birmingham School of Art. He was president of the Royal Birmingham Society of Artists (RBSA), 1954–1955, a member of the Royal Watercolour Society and an Associate of the Royal College of Arts.

By September 1964, he was living in Westbury-on-Trym, and was made an Honorary member of the RBSA.

His pupils included Percy Shakespeare and Norman Neasom.

Two of his works are in the RBSA permanent collection.
