= Harriet Isabel Adams =

British author, artist and scientific illustrator (1863–1952)

- Born: Harriet Isabel Baker; 1863
- Died: 22 September 1952; Finstall
- Education: Birmingham School of Art
- Occupation: Artist
- Awards: Fellow of the Linnean Society of London (1906)

Harriet Isabel Adams (1863–1952), known as H. Isabel Adams, was a British artist and illustrator. She is best known for her botanical drawings issued as coloured Plates in the 2-book set called 'Wild Flowers of the British Isles' published by William Heinemann, London UK: volume one 1907; volume two 1910.

== Life and career ==
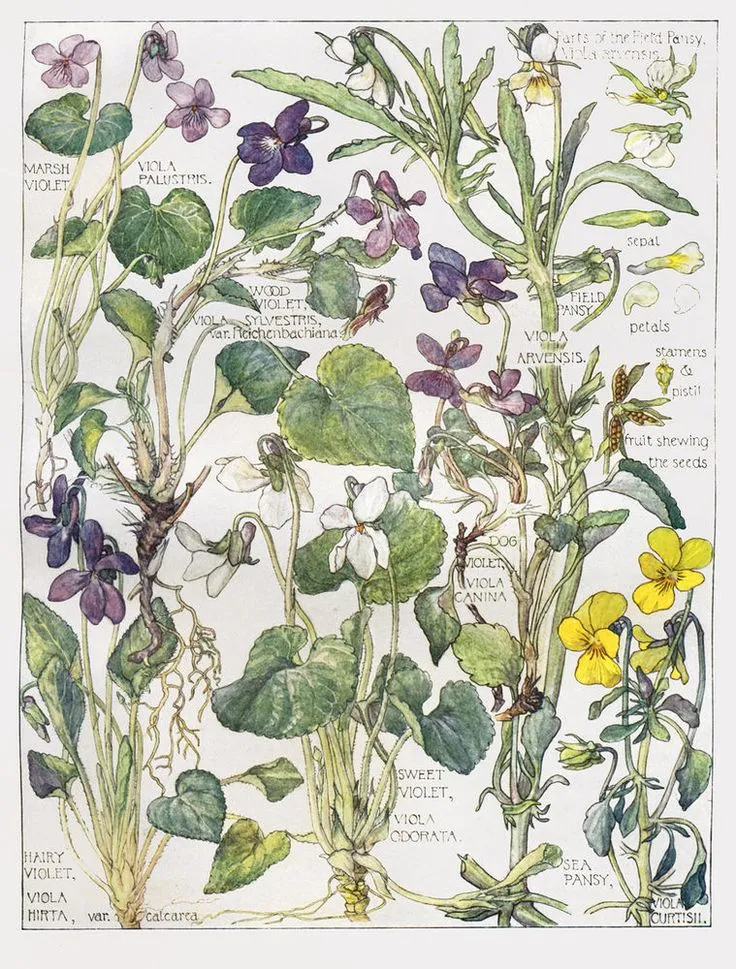
The Violet family, from 'Wild Flowers of the British Isles' (1907)

H. Isabel Adams was born in England.

She attended the Birmingham Municipal School of Art in Margaret Street, Birmingham, and she produced illustrations in an Arts and Crafts style.

In 1906 Adams became a Fellow of the Linnean Society of London, accredited with being the oldest biological society in the world. The Linnean Society had only begun to admit women in 1904 so this was an outstanding achievement for Isabel, which is the name she preferred to use. Adams was also a member of the Botanical Society and Exchange Club of the British Isles.

Shortly after she was awarded her FLS, the first volume of her book, Wild Flowers of the British Isles, was published in 1907, followed by the second volume in 1910. Accompanying her botanical illustrations was an in-depth guide to every wildflower found in the British Isles.

== Reviews and honorary mentions ==
Listed below are notable reviews and honourable mentions of Adams' work:

=== Wild Flowers of the British Isles ===
==== Volume I ====
- Review written in The Spectator, under section labeled Botany, Birds, and Angling, published on September 7, 1907:

"Her book does not compete, of course, with Bentham or Hooker's hand- books; but it is sufficiently scientific to enable serious botanists to recommend it to beginners. There are some eighty full-page plates in this quarto volume. We have seen few flower drawings (always excepting Curtis's Flora Londinensis) that have given us so much pleasure to look at. From one to half-a-dozen plants are figured on a page; but Miss Adams manages to keep the character of each species distinct, and the grouping is often full of skill and grace. We have nothing but praise for the colouring, especially the various greens. The yellow of the rock-rose is beautiful, and the more subdued mauves and pinks are excellent. It is all slightly conventional, but gives a truer effect than many an attempt at realism. The stalks are sometimes drawn too thick. For instance, in Limon eathartiewm the pedicels should be the merest threads. We regret that, though there is a description of every species in all the orders that are dealt with, only about a third are represented in the plates."

==== Volume II ====
- Review written in an article by Nature, on December 1, 1910:

"Enough has been said to show that this book cannot rank as a valuable contribution to the science of botany, and it is all the more to be regretted when the excellence of the drawings is considered. Although in some of the plates there is unnecessary crowding, yet the draughtsmanship throughout is of a high order, and the plates of Convolvulus and Tamus communis, to mention two only, are beautiful works of art. A complete series of plant pictures of our British flora by Mrs. Adams would be of considerable value, and it is a matter for regret that so much skill and labour should have been expended on a book so pretentious and incomplete, which, with all its accuracy of drawing, unfortunately can only be regarded as a work for the drawing-room table."
