= Stoneleigh, Warwickshire =

Village in Warwickshire, England

Coordinates: 52.351436°N 1.514719°W

Stoneleigh
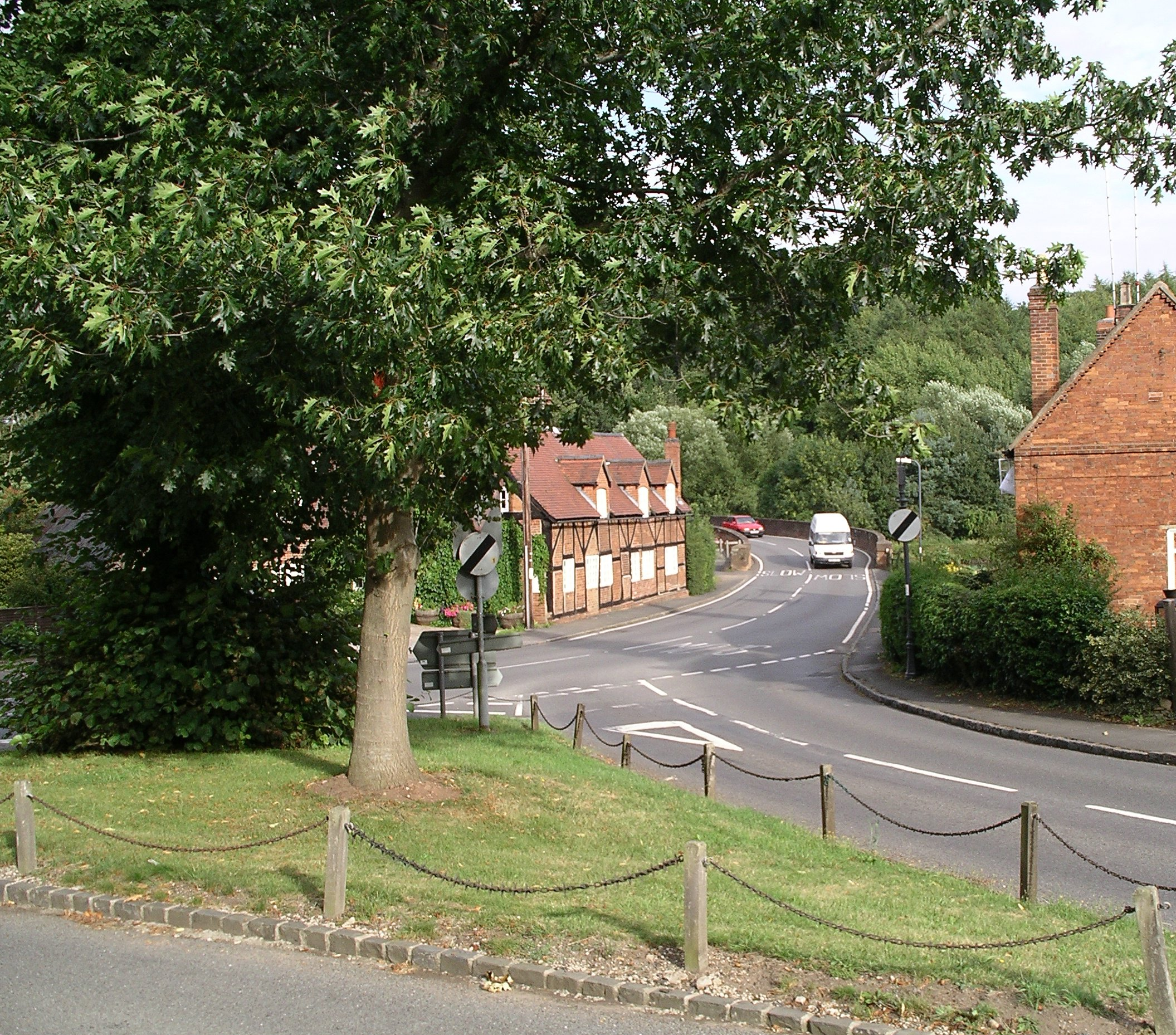
- The bridge over the River Sowe in Stoneleigh

- Location within Warwickshire
- Population: 3,636 (2011)
- OS grid reference: SP330727
- District: Warwick
- Shire county: Warwickshire
- Region: West Midlands
- Country: England
- Sovereign state: United Kingdom
- Post town: Kenilworth
- Postcode district: CV8
- Police: Warwickshire
- Fire: Warwickshire
- Ambulance: West Midlands
- UK Parliament: Kenilworth and Southam

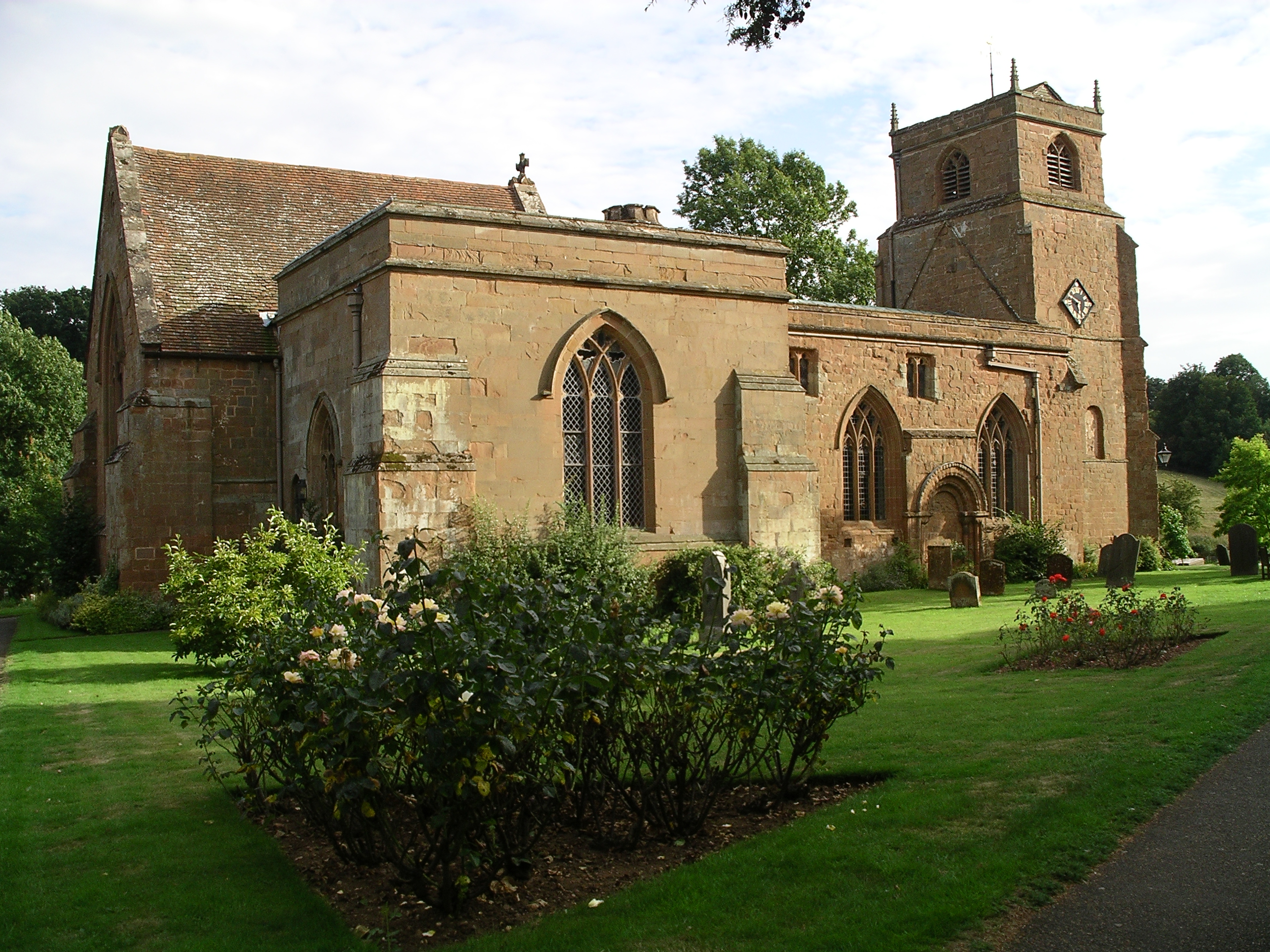
The Church of the Virgin Mary in Stoneleigh, Warwickshire

Stoneleigh, or Stoneleigh-in-Arden, is a small village in Warwickshire, England, on the River Sowe, situated 4.5 miles (7.25 km) south of Coventry and 5.5 miles (9 km) north of Leamington Spa. The population taken at the 2011 census was 3,636. The village is about 600 yards (549 m) northeast of the confluence of the River Sowe and the River Avon. The village's church is dedicated to the Virgin Mary. Stoneleigh has no public house: all three were closed by Lord Leigh more than 100 years ago, after his daughter was laughed at by drunks when she was going to church on a tricycle. However it has a social club, which meets in the evenings on Vicarage Road.

Stoneleigh was the site of the most destructive tornado of the record-breaking nationwide tornado outbreak of 23 November 1981. The second-strongest tornado of the outbreak, rated as an F2/T4 tornado, passed through Stoneleigh and the surrounding areas at around 14:00 local time, causing severe damage including the complete destruction of a static caravan park and damage to residential buildings.

== Stoneleigh Abbey ==
Stoneleigh Abbey is to the southwest of the village of Stoneleigh. It was founded in 1154 by the Cistercians. From 1561 to 1990 it was the home of the Leigh family. In 1996, The Rt Hon. John, 5th Baron Leigh (1935–2003), transferred ownership of Stoneleigh Abbey and its 690-acre (279 ha) grounds to a charitable trust. Between 1996 and 2000 it was extensively renovated with the help of grants, including a large grant from the Heritage Lottery Fund. Within the grounds of the Abbey are two groups of houses built by Charles Church in 2002, named Grovehurst Park and The Cunnery. A row of old workers' cottages, Rectory Cottages, were totally renovated in the same year.

== Stoneleigh Park ==
Stoneleigh Park (previously known as the National Agricultural Centre) is to the southwest of the village. Stoneleigh Park is an exhibition and conference centre which used to host, amongst many other annual events, the Royal Show, a huge national agricultural event, and the Town and Country Festival. From 1991 to 2001 it hosted the Newfrontiers "Stoneleigh Bible Week", when up to 30,000 Christians from all over the world gathered for worship and teaching over a fortnight with alternating weeks.

== Notable people ==
- Geoffrey Edmunds (born 1954), cricketer
