= Norah Ansell =

British artist

Norah Marjorie Ansell
- Born: 6 July 1906; Wiltshire, England
- Died: 1990 (aged 83–84); Birmingham, England
- Education: Birmingham College of Arts and Crafts
- Known for: Sculpture

Norah Marjorie Ansell (6 July 1906 –1990) was a British sculptor who worked mostly in wood, ivory and bronze.

== Biography ==
Ansell was born in Wiltshire and took evening classes at the Birmingham College of Arts and Crafts and remained in that city for most of her career, living in the Edgbaston area. She produced statuettes and portrait busts in a variety of materials including bronze, wood and ivory. Ansell exhibited with the Royal Glasgow Institute of the Fine Arts and the Royal Academy in London during 1945 and then subsequently with the Royal Academy. From 1950 to 1955 she was a regular exhibitor with the Society of Women Artists. Ansell was awarded a prize at the International Ivory Sculpture Competition and Exhibition held in New York at the Carlebach Gallery in 1953.
