= Trinity High School and Sixth Form Centre =

Location
- Easemore Road; Redditch, Worcestershire, B98 8HB; 52.308881°N 1.935698°W

Information
- Type: Academy
- Established: 2001
- Local authority: Worcestershire County Council
- Specialist: Business & Enterprise
- Department for Education URN: 137167 Tables
- Ofsted: Reports
- Chair: Barry Preever
- Headteacher: Nigel Ford
- Gender: Mixed
- Age: 13 to 18
- Enrolment: 837
- Sixth form students: 164
- Houses: Bredon, Kinver, Malvern
- Colours: Blue, Yellow, Green
- Website: http://www.trinity.worcs.sch.uk/

Trinity High School and Sixth Form Centre is a 13-18 co-educational academy school located in central Redditch, Worcestershire, England.

== Admissions ==
The school is located within a few minutes of the Kingfisher Shopping Centre and the area of central Redditch, just north of the roundabout of the A4023 and B4160. The school is on Easemore Road.

About 25% of the students are from minority ethnic backgrounds. The majority of these are of Pakistani origin, with many speaking English as an additional language. A 2010 Ofsted report accorded the school a Grade 2 (Good).

== History ==
The school began as the Redditch County High School, a grammar school with around 1,000 boys and girls, with 200 in the sixth form. The school operated a house system with four houses, Angles, Celts, Jutes and Saxons. The main school buildings designed by Henry Walter Simister opened in 1932. It became a comprehensive school in 1974, and was renamed the Abbey High School after the nearby ruins of Bordesley Abbey, continuing to operate the original house system. In 2001 the Abbey High School was closed and reopened as Trinity High School and Sixth Form Centre. In 2004, Trinity became a Business and Enterprise specialist school, and on 1 August 2011 Trinity became Redditch's first Independent State Funded Academy.

== Feeder schools ==
Trinity High School draws the majority of its intake in from its two feeder schools, Birchensale Middle School and Woodfield Academy.

== Notable former pupils ==
=== Abbey High School ===
- Geoffrey Edmunds, cricketer
- John Taylor, bassist in the group Duran Duran

=== Redditch County High School ===
- Bryan Davies, Baron Davies of Oldham, Labour MP for Enfield North from 1974 to 1979 and Oldham Central and Royton from 1992 to 1997
- Norman Neasom, painter
- Ric Sanders, Violin/Fiddle player with Fairport Convention
