= Bernard Fleetwood-Walker =

English painter

- Amity (1933), Oil on canvas.
- Born: 22 March 1893; Birmingham, United Kingdom
- Died: 30 January 1965 (aged 71); London
- Education: Birmingham School of Art
- Known for: Painting

Bernard Fleetwood-Walker, PPRBSA, (22 March 1893 – 30 January 1965) was an English artist and teacher of painting.

Bernard Fleetwood-Walker (invariably known as B. Fleetwood-Walker) was born on 22 March 1893 in Birmingham, United Kingdom, a twin and one of five children. His father William Walker was an electrical engineer and co-inventor of the Walker-Wilkins battery, while his mother Electra Amelia (née Varley) was granddaughter of the 19th century watercolourist Cornelius Varley who, together with his brother John Varley, had been amongst the founder members of the Royal Watercolour Society in 1804.

Fleetwood-Walker was educated at Barford Street School and at King Edward's Grammar School, Five Ways and went on to train in the arts as a silver and goldsmith. Through working as a modeller and on low relief he developed an interest in painting and furthered his studies at the Birmingham School of Art and Crafts, as well as in London and under Fleury in Paris.

During the First World War he served in France as a sniper in the Artists Rifles and was wounded and gassed. Various studies exist showing he continued to draw while in the army and a fellow soldier, years later in a letter to the artist's widow, described mural decorations he painted for Christmas 1918 on the wall of a warehouse being used as a mess-hall in the deserted village of Auberchicourt, near Douai, using dry colours found in a builder's yard mixed with 'the glutinous substance you get from oatmeal porridge'. These materials were 'food and drink to him' and he regarded the war years as wasted time.

Returning to Birmingham after the war, he married Marjorie White ('Mickey') in 1920 and had two sons, Colin and Guy. He taught, first at King Edward's Grammar School, Aston, where he designed remarkably avant-garde scenery for the school plays, and then from 1929 as a lecturer at the Birmingham College of Art under Harold Holden. Having been trained at a time when strong drawing and a high level of technical skill was the pre-requisite of a successful career, he excelled as a draughtsman and through his teaching encouraged these virtues in others. He encouraged his students to use every sort of medium to hand, doled out fierce criticism and demanded high standards, and lectured on contemporary art movements. He worked prodigiously during this time, exhibiting at the Royal Academy from 1925, developing his abilities as a practising artist and quickly gaining a reputation not only as a painter of portraits and children but also for the large figurative paintings of the 1930s, many of which are now in public collections.

He had a one-man exhibition at the Ruskin Gallery, Birmingham in 1927, but showed his work primarily at the societies to which he regularly sent his work. He was elected an Associate of the Royal Academy in 1946 and a Royal Academician in 1956 – showing a total of 147 works there over the years. He was a member of the Royal Society of Portrait Painters, the Royal Institute of Oil Painters and the New English Art Club. Always extremely loyal to his hometown, he declared he was proud to be the only Royal Academician from Birmingham who still lived and worked there, and was particularly pleased to have been elected President of the Royal Birmingham Society of Artists (RBSA) in 1950. In 1946 Fleetwood-Walker was elected to the Royal Watercolour Society consequently fulfilling the conditions of Cornelius Varley's will – that the next artist in his family to be a member should inherit Varley's studio collection.

After his first wife died, he married Dr Peggy Frazer in 1939 and continued to work and teach in Birmingham through to 1956. Each year he would take a group of students from Birmingham to sketch in Cornwall and was a member of the St Ives Society of Artists (1936–1949). He also went on sketching tours on the continent and exhibited at the Paris Salon winning both bronze and silver medals. He finally moved to Chelsea so that he could devote more time to the students at the Royal Academy School where he was Assistant Keeper. He died in London on 30 January 1965.

In the introductory essay of the catalogue to the Memorial Exhibition held at the RBSA in 1965, Richard Seddon described his work as follows:

'He allowed his style to develop to the full and kept moving throughout his active life as an artist; and from the drawing and painting of a conceptual clarity based on his disciplined skill with line, he progressed to a visual intensity that synthesised light, space and tactile qualities as unified images laid on the canvas with a spontaneity and breadth unsurpassed by many of his British contemporaries.'
