= Royal Birmingham Society of Artists =

Artist society in the United Kingdom

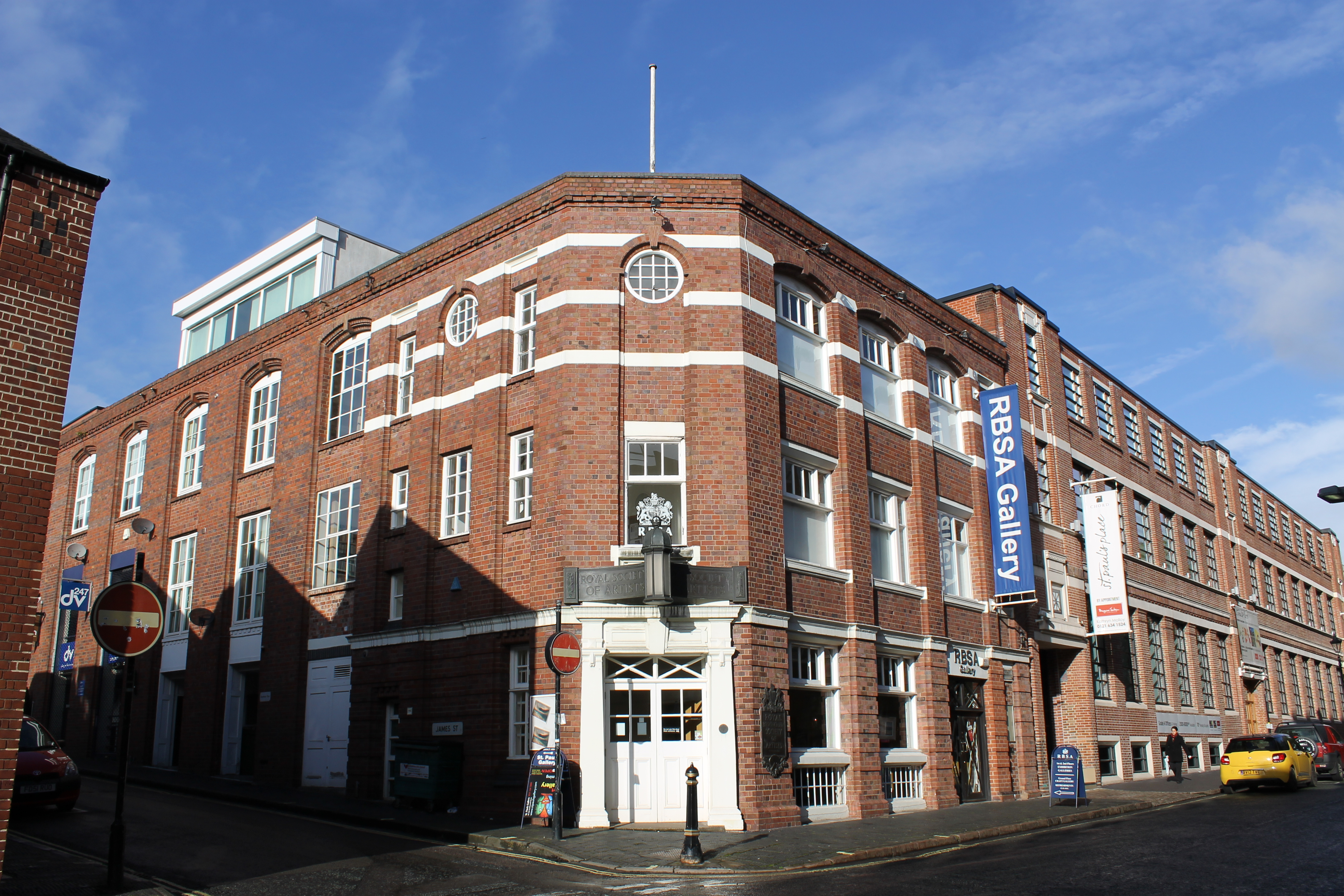
- Formation: 1821
- Location: 4, Brook Street, Birmingham, England
- Coordinates: 52.4849°N 1.9075°W
- Website: www.rbsa.org.uk
- Formerly called: Birmingham Society of Artists

The Royal Birmingham Society of Artists (RBSA) is an art society, based in the Jewellery Quarter in Birmingham, England, where it owns and operates an art gallery, the RBSA Gallery, on Brook Street, just off St Paul's Square. It is both a registered charity, and a registered company (no. 122616).

== History ==
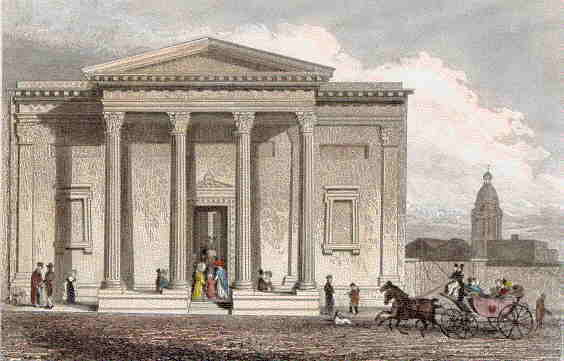
The original New Street home of the RBSA, illustrated in 1830

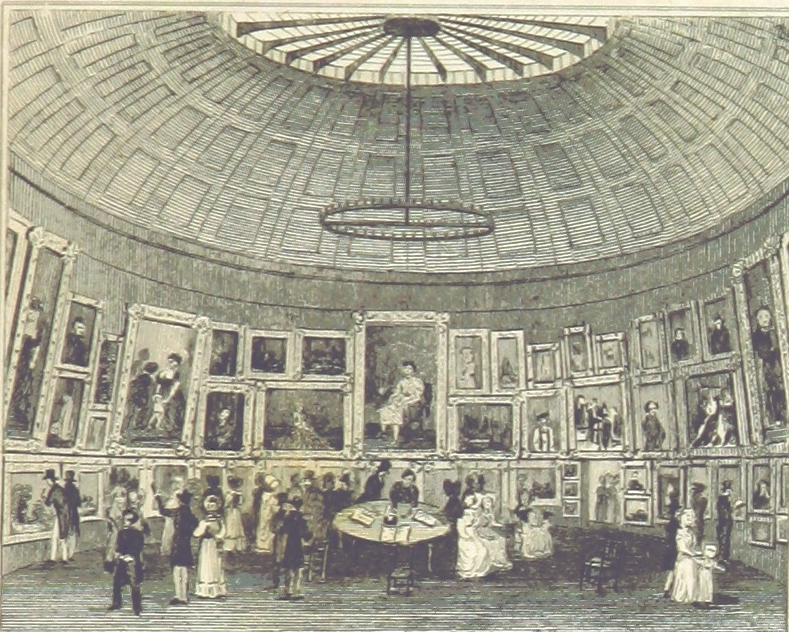
The exhibition room in 1829

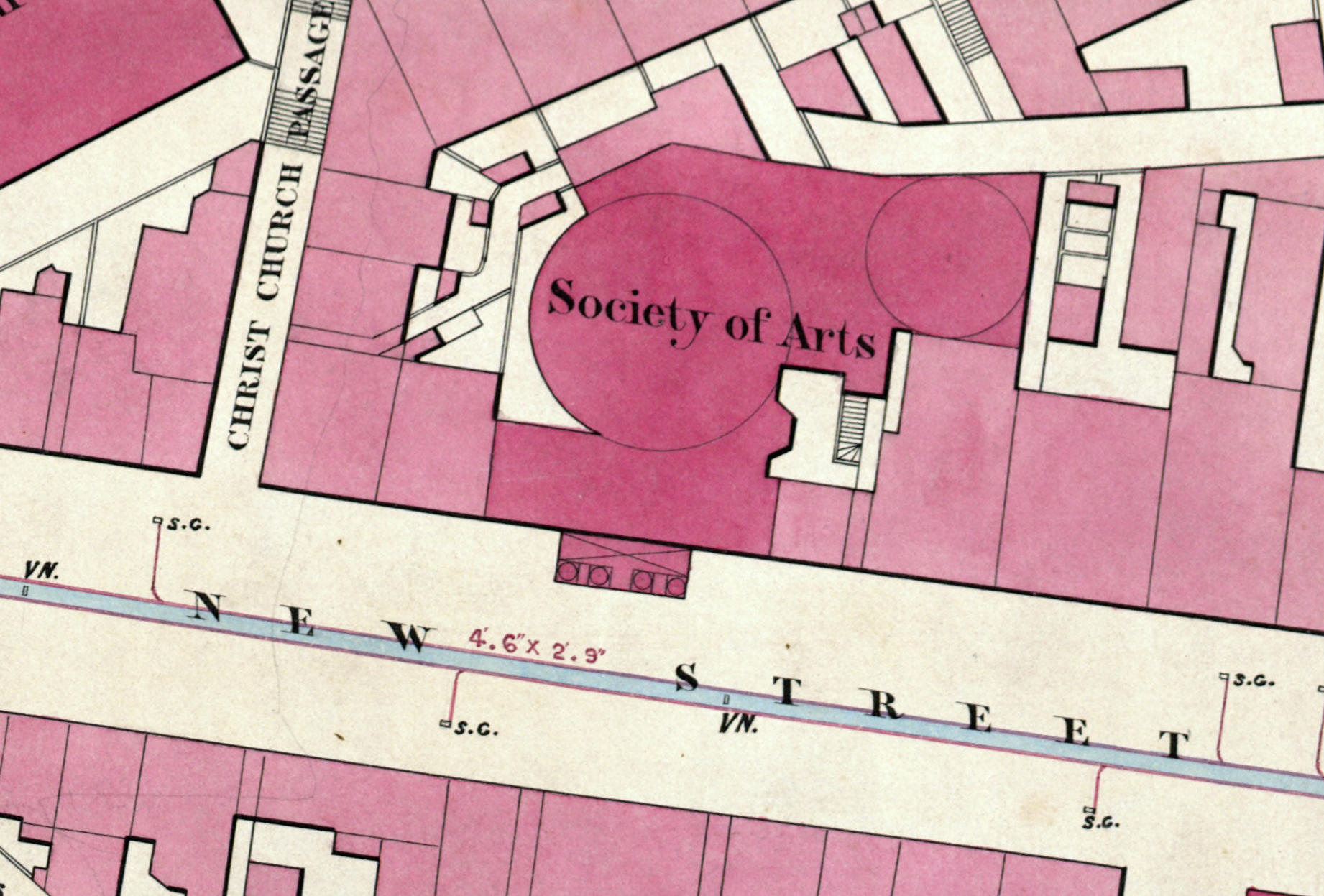
The New Street premises in 1855, on the New Survey of the Borough of Birmingham

The RBSA was established as the Birmingham Society of Artists in 1821, though it can trace its origins back further to the life drawing academy opened by Samuel Lines, Moses Haughton, Vincent Barber and Charles Barber in Peck Lane (now the site of New Street Station) in 1809. From this group was founded the Birmingham Academy of Arts in 1814, whose first exhibition was held that year. In 1821, the Birmingham Society of Arts moved into a circular building on New Street however this was replaced by a new gallery and set of offices built behind a fine neo-classical portico in New Street by architects Thomas Rickman and Henry Hutchinson in 1829. In 1868 the RBSA received its royal charter and adopted its current name.

The RBSA was to become a highly influential body in the later Victorian period, particularly within the Pre-Raphaelite and Arts and Crafts movements. Its members included some of the most significant figures in English art, and presidents during the period included artists of the stature of Edward Burne-Jones, William Morris, John Everett Millais and Lord Leighton. The Membership has two levels with artists first being elected Associates and then full Members. Members and Associates of the Royal Birmingham Society of Artists are entitled to use the post-nominal letters "RBSA" and "ARBSA" respectively.

One of principal aims of the Society from its foundation had been to continue the educational activities pioneered by Lines. Initially this work was carried out by the society itself, but in 1842 group split and the Birmingham School of Art was founded as a separate institution a year later, falling under municipal control from 1877.

Annual exhibitions of work by the Membership have taken place every year since the inaugural exhibition in 1827 (apart from 1940, 1941, and 2020).

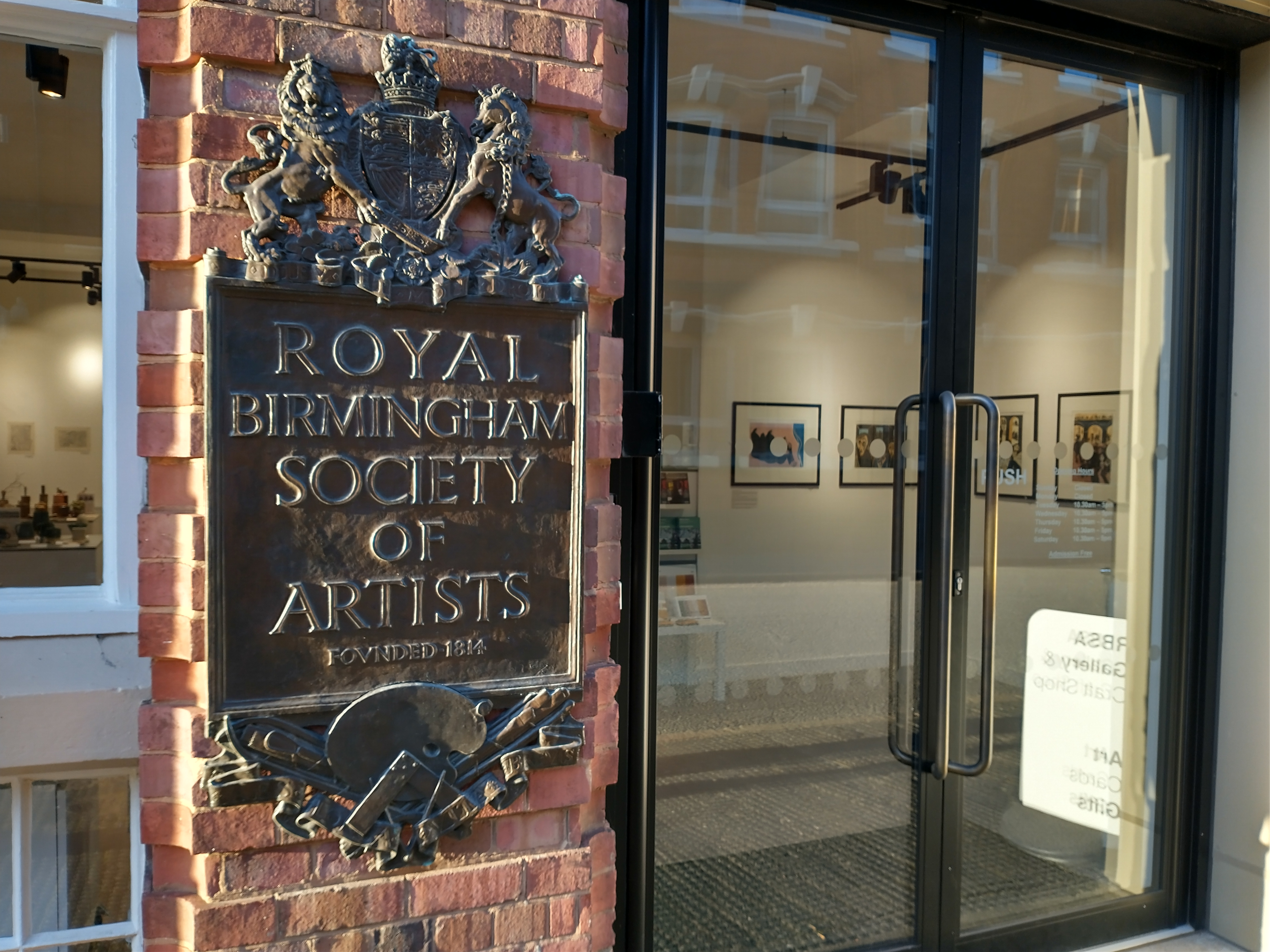
The RBSA Gallery entrance in 2024

Increasing financial pressure in the early years of the 20th century led to the society's landmark New Street building being demolished and rebuilt as part of a commercial redevelopment, and in 2000 the society left the site completely, relocating to a converted warehouse near St Paul's Square in the Jewellery Quarter (grid reference SP063874). This is now known as the RBSA Gallery, and was opened by Charles, Prince of Wales, on 12 April 2000.

Since the move, the RBSA has continued to expand and develop its activities. The Permanent Collection and Archive is now housed in a purpose built store which has allowed the collection to grow to around 1000 works, alongside countless catalogues, letters, records, and minutes, all documenting the Society's history. This collection is also an important record of the arts in Birmingham and the city's history. The RBSA successfully applied for Museum Accreditation in 2006 and exhibitions of work from the collection take places twice a year.

In 2017, the RBSA received a legacy from Kate Fryer, a long-standing Member and RBSA Professor of Painting. This kick-started the full refurbishment of the Gallery which was also supported by grants from other charitable trusts.

The two bronze plaques on its exterior, made in 1919, are the earliest known Birmingham works of William Bloye, later the society's president and Professor of Sculpture.

=== Presidents ===
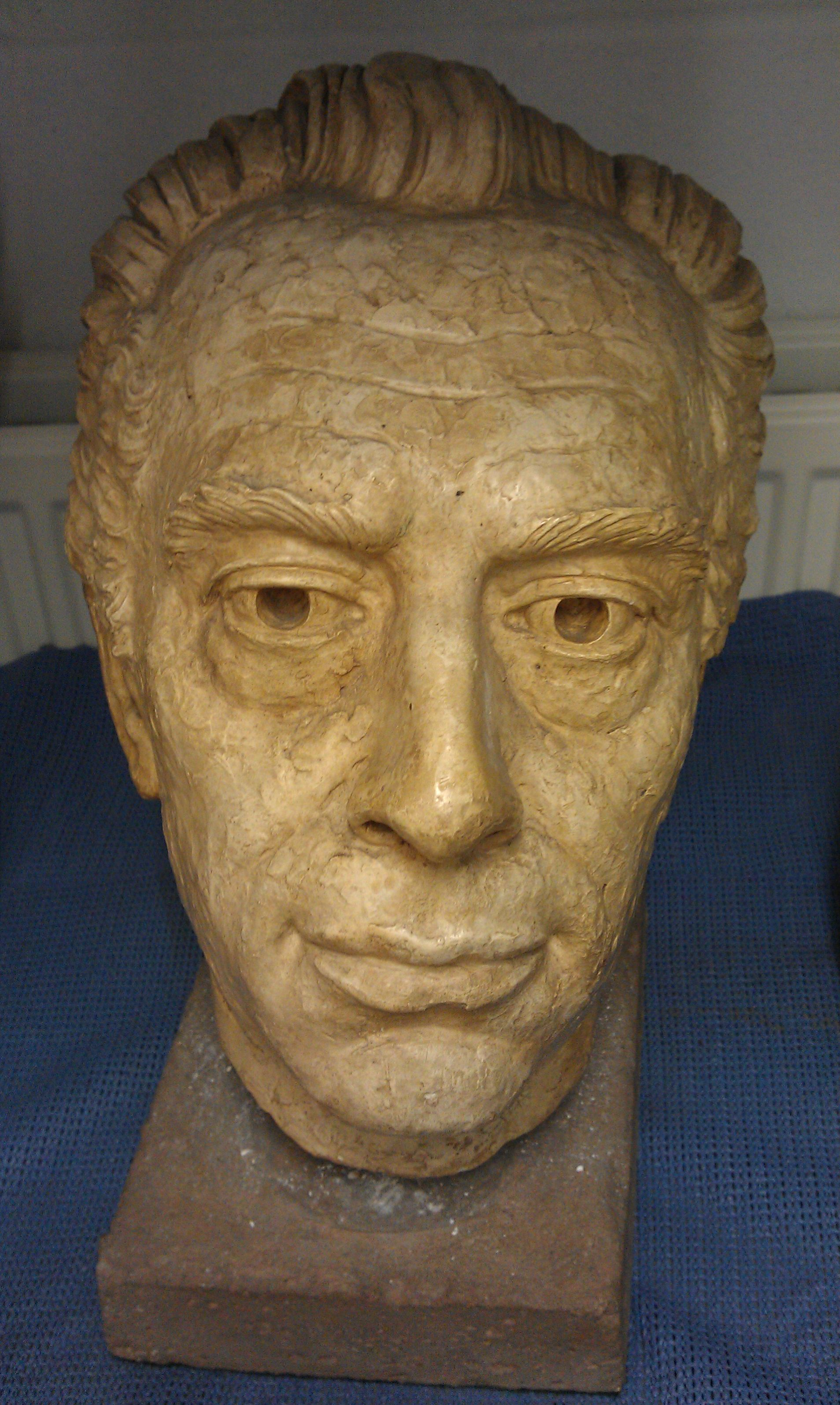
Head of Man, by RBSA president William Bloye, part of the gallery's permanent collection

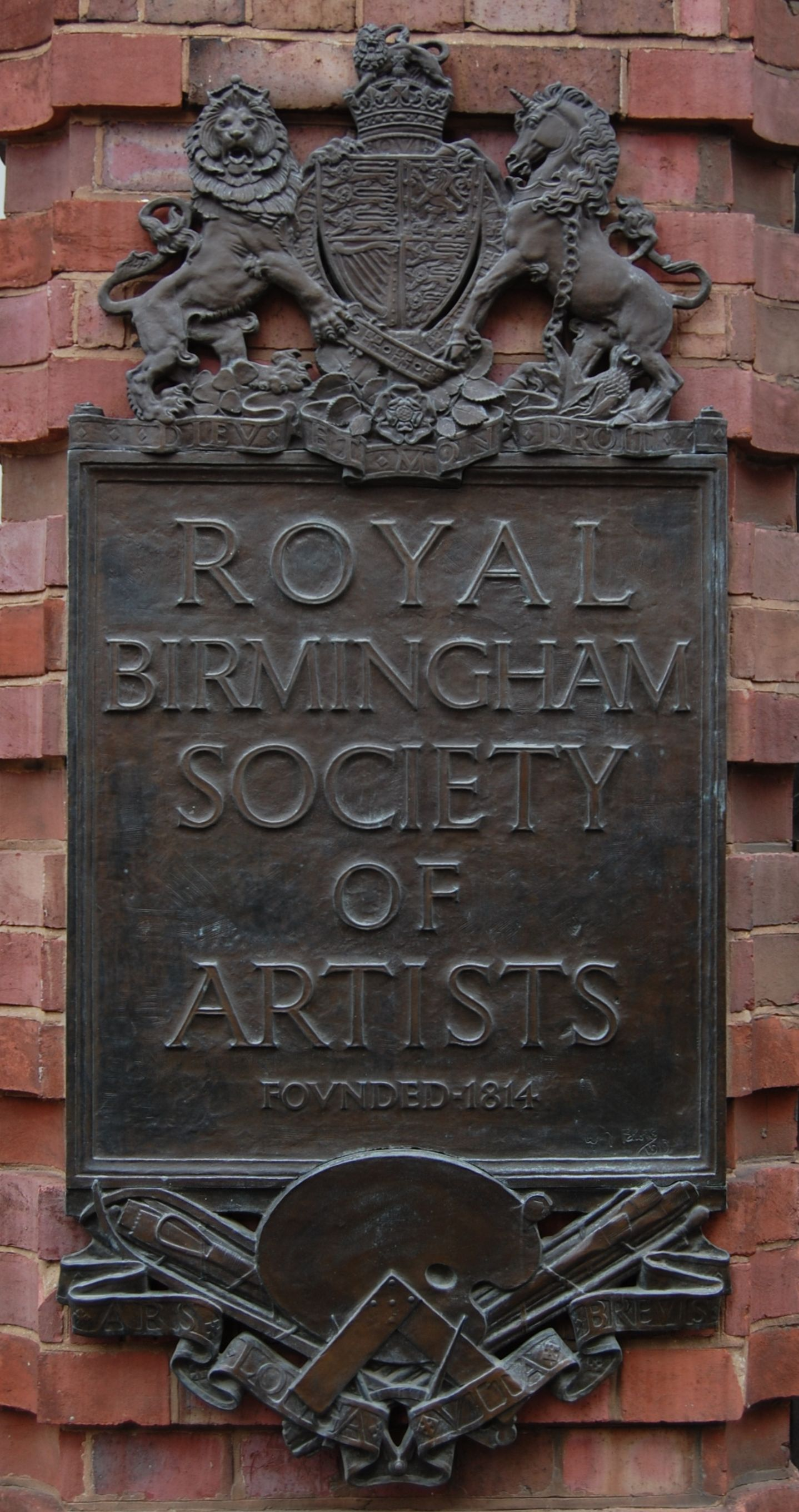
One of the pair of identical plaques by William Bloye

Many of the Society's presidents were notable artists. They include:

- 1842–1849: Sir Martin Archer Shee, PRA
- 1850–1865: Sir Charles Lock Eastlake, PRA
- 1866–1878: Sir Francis Grant, PRA
- 1879–1880: Sir Frederick Leighton, Bart., PRA
- 1881–1882: Sir John Everett Millais, Bart., PRA
- 1883–1884: Lawrence Alma-Tadema, RA
- 1885–1886: Sir Edward Burne-Jones, Bart.
- 1887–1888: George Frederic Watts, RA
- 1889–1890: Sir Frederick Leighton, Bart., PRA
- 1891–1892: William Quiller Orchardson, RA
- 1893–1894: Professor Hubert von Herkomer, RA
- 1895–1896: Lawrence Alma-Tadema, RA
- 1897–1898: Sir Edward Poynter, PRA
- 1899–1900: Sir William Blake Richmond, KCB, DCL, RA
- 1901–1902: Edwin Abbey, RA
- 1903–1904: Valentine Cameron Prinsep, RA
- 1905–1906: Sir Aston Webb, RA
- 1907–1908: Sir Ernest Waterlow, RA, PRWS
- 1909: Edward John Gregory, RA, PRI
- 1910–1914: Sir George Frampton, RA, LLD, FSA
- 1915–1924: Alfred Drury, RA
- 1925–1926: Frank Brangwyn, RA
- 1927–1931: William John Wainwright, RWS
- 1931–1935: J.V. Jelley
- 1935–1939: Edward S. Harper
- 1939–1945: Joseph Southall (died in post, 1944)
- 1945–1948: Charles Wheeler, RA
- 1948–1950: William Bloye, FRBS
- 1950–1952: Bernard Fleetwood-Walker, ARA, RWS, ROI, RP, NEAC
- 1952–1953: Henry Rushbury, RA, RWS, RE
- 1953–1955: Harold Holden, RWS, ARCA (Lond.)
- 1956–1958: Holland W. Hobbiss, FRIBA
- 1958–1960: Leonard Ward, RI, ARCamA
- 1960–1962: Herbert Jackson, FRIBA
- 1962–1964: George Monkhouse, FCIS
- 1964–1966: C. Harry Adams, SSI
- 1966–1971: Douglas Perry
- 1971–1973: Jack Metson
- 1973–1974: Bruce Hurn
- 1974–1978: James Priddey
- 1978–1980: Joan Elizabeth Woollard
- 1980–1983: Peter Gross
- 1983–1987: W. Alex Jackson
- 1987–1992: C.A. Sawbridge
- 1992–1995: Ernest Horton
- 1995–2001: Marylane Barfield
- 2001–2003: Roger Forbes
- 2003–2005: Roy Winter
- 2005–2008: Michele White
- 2008–2012: John Scott Martin
- 2012–2019: Robert Neil
- 2019–2021: Wayne Attwood
- 2021–2022: Steve Evans
- 2022–2025: Viv Astling
- 2025 - present: Ed Isaacs

== Current activities ==
The RBSA continues its core activities today as an independent, artist-led charity which supports artists and promotes engagement with the visual arts through a range of exhibitions, events and workshops.

== See also ==
- Category:Members and Associates of the Royal Birmingham Society of Artists
