= Birmingham School of Art =

Former art school in Birmingham, England

Coordinates: 52°28′52.42″N 1°54′11.97″W

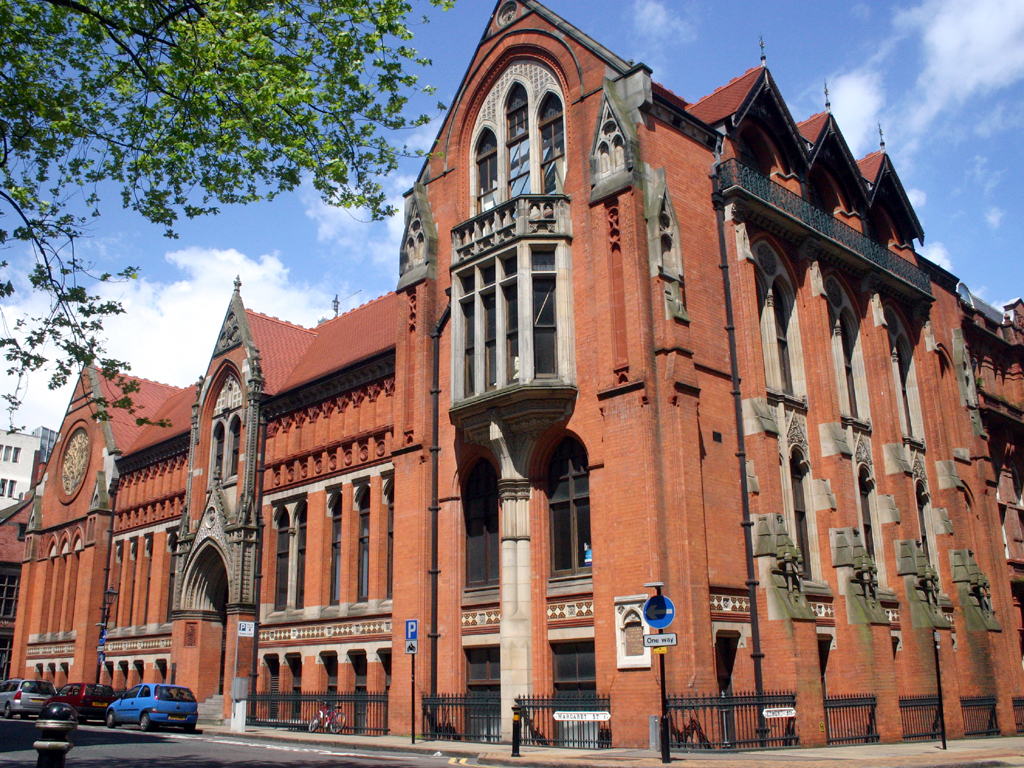
- School of Art and Design Building, Margaret Street
- Former name: Birmingham School of Fine Art
- Type: Art school
- Active: 1843–1971
- Affiliations: Birmingham City University; Birmingham Institute of Art and Design
- Location: Birmingham, West Midlands, England
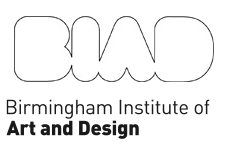

The Birmingham School of Art was a municipal art school based in the centre of Birmingham, England. Although the organisation was absorbed by Birmingham Polytechnic in 1971 and is now part of Birmingham City University's Faculty of Arts, Design and Media, its Grade I listed building on Margaret Street remains the home of the university's Department of Fine Art and is still commonly referred to by its original title.

== History ==
The origins of the School of Art lie with the Royal Birmingham Society of Artists, who founded the Birmingham Government School of Design in 1843. George Wallis (1811–1891), Wolverhampton-born artist and art educator, was its headmaster in 1852–1858.

In 1877, the Town Council was persuaded by the school's energetic headmaster Edward R. Taylor to take the school over and expand it to form the United Kingdom's first municipal college of art. With funding coming from Sir Richard and George Tangye, the current building was commissioned from architect John Henry Chamberlain.

In 1885, the school became the first Municipal School of Art. It later becomes the leading centre for the Arts and Crafts Movement.

An associated School of Architecture was formed in 1909 and received recognition by the Royal Institute of British Architects in 1923. By the 1960s, the School had outgrown the original Margaret Street building and expanded into the campus of the University of Aston in Gosta Green.

In 1971, with the founding of Birmingham Polytechnic, the School of Art lost its independence and became the Polytechnic's Faculty of Art and Design. In 1988, this in turn absorbed the former Bournville College of Art to form the Birmingham Institute of Art and Design, the largest centre for education in art, design and the media in the United Kingdom outside London. Birmingham Polytechnic gained university status in 1992 as the University of Central England, which was renamed Birmingham City University in 2007.

== Building ==
The Birmingham School of Art building was designed for the school of art by architect John Henry Chamberlain from January 1882 until October 1883, and was built from May 31 1884 until its opening in September 1885.

== Alumni ==
- Harriet Isabel Adams, watercolour artist
- Helen Allingham, watercolour painter
- Norah Ansell, sculptor
- Evelin Winifred Aston, sculptor
- Eileen Blake, painter
- Kate Bunce, painter
- Rose Connor, architect
- Archibald John Davies, stained glass artist
- Harry Eccleston, painter, etcher, banknote designer
- Ian Emes, animator and film director
- Rowland Emett, cartoonist and constructor of whimsical kinetic sculpture
- Elizabeth Bertha Fraser, sculptor
- Mabel Greenberg, painter
- David Hardy, astronomical artist
- Evelyn Holden, illustrator and artist
- George Edward Hunt, jeweller
- Marjorie Incledon, painter, stained glass designer
- A E Lemmon, stained glass designer
- Celia Levetus, author, poet and illustrator
- Dorothy Lockwood, painter, illustrator
- Hilda T. Miller, illustrator, painter
- Terence Parkes, cartoonist (Larry)
- Ronald Pennell, artist, engraver and sculptor
- Fay Pomerance, painter
- David Prentice, painter
- Constance Smedley, founder of women's clubs
- Rosemary Stjernstedt, architect
- Howard Taylor, painter, sculptor
- David Tremlett, artist
- John Walker, painter
- George T. Morgan, engraver and medalist

== Archives ==
The School of Art Archive is now held at Birmingham City University. The University of Birmingham's Cadbury Research Library holds material related to the Arts and Crafts movement that occurred in the school, when it was sometimes referred to as the Birmingham College of Arts and Crafts. Both collections include examples of the influence of Leonard Jay, who taught at the school and had a significant impact on mid-20th century printing.
