= List of Birmingham City University people =

This is a list of notable alumni and staff of Birmingham City University, in Birmingham, England, and its predecessor institutions:

- Anstey College of Physical Education
- Birmingham and Solihull College of Nursing and Midwifery
- Birmingham College of Commerce
- Birmingham School of Acting
- Birmingham School of Art
- Birmingham School of Jewellery
- Birmingham School of Music (now Birmingham Conservatoire)
- Bordesley College of Education
- Bournville College of Art (now the Bournville Centre for Visual Arts)
- City of Birmingham College of Education
- Defence School of Health Care Studies
- North Birmingham Technical College
- South Birmingham Technical College
- West Midlands School of Radiography

== Staff ==
- Mark Addis
- Chris Baines — environmentalist
- Charles Bateman — architect
- William Bidlake
- William Bloye
- Jonathan Bowen — computer scientist
- Paul Bradshaw — journalist
- John Bridgeman — sculptor
- Paul Clarkson
- Benjamin Creswick
- Trevor Denning
- Elizabeth Fradd
- Arthur Gaskin
- Bruce George
- Charles March Gere
- Bruce Grocott, Baron Grocott
- Albert Herbert
- Islam Issa
- Zhiming Liu — computer scientist
- Sylvani Merilion
- Sidney Meteyard
- Nicola Monaghan
- David Prentice
- Roy Priest — musician (formerly of Sweet Jesus)
- Marius Romme
- Jeffrey Skidmore
- Edward R. Taylor
- Philip Tew
- George Wallis
- David Wilson — criminologist
- Simon M. Woods

== Alumni ==
=== Armed forces ===
- Harry Price — Royal Navy seaman

=== Art and design ===
- Samira Abbassy
- Martin Aitchison
- Maxwell Armfield
- Grace Barnsley
- Alfred Bestall
- Stephen Biesty
- Richard Billingham — photographer
- William Bloye
- Emmy Bridgwater
- Gerald Brockhurst
- Herbert Tudor Buckland
- Kate Bunce
- Edward Burne-Jones
- Joseph Finnemore
- Arthur Gaskin (also staff)
- Georgie Gaskin
- Frederick Gibberd
- Bunny Guinness
- Edwin Harris
- William Alexander Harvey
- William Haywood — architect
- Gordon Herickx
- Roger Hiorns — artist
- Robert van 't Hoff
- Alex Hughes — Tribune cartoonist
- Betty Jackson — fashion designer
- Robert Furneaux Jordan
- David McFall
- Danie Mellor
- Oscar Mellor
- Sidney Meteyard (also staff)
- H. R. Millar
- William Jabez Muckley
- Edmund Hort New
- Dorrie Nossiter
- Hugh O'Donnell — artist
- Henry Payne — artist
- Peter Phillips — artist
- George Phoenix
- John Poole — sculptor
- Donald Rodney — artist
- Henry Rushbury
- John Salt
- Percy Shakespeare
- John Shelley — illustrator
- Bernard Sleigh
- Joseph Southall
- Marty St. James — video artist
- David Tremlett
- Ian Walters
- Harry Weedon
- Robert Welch — designer
- Phil Winslade
- Graham Winteringham
- A. H. Woodfull
- John Skirrow Wright
- Tang Da Wu

=== Media ===
- Smitthi Bhiraleus
- Marverine Cole — broadcast journalist
- Kirsten O'Brien — children's television presenter
- Fiona Phillips — TV presenter
- Mary Rhodes — sports TV presenter
- Bob Rickard
- Charlie Stayt — BBC newsreader
- Margherita Taylor — radio and TV presenter

=== Medicine and science ===
- Bethann Siviter — nurse-author
- Kevin Warwick — scientist

=== Performing arts ===
- Carole Boyd
- James Bradshaw — actor (of the Birmingham School of Acting)
- Fecko — hip hop artist
- Anna Brewster
- Nicola Coughlan — actress
- Krzysztof Czerwiński
- Nick Duffy — musician
- Stephen Duffy — singer-songwriter
- Jeremy Filsell
- Nicholas Gledhill
- Ainsley Howard
- Barbara Keogh
- Tom Lister
- Luke Mably
- Jimi Mistry — actor (of the Birmingham School of Acting)
- Horace Panter
- Rhydian Roberts — singer and The X Factor contestant
- Jack Rubinacci
- Jinny Sandhú — professional wrestler
- Frank Skinner — comedian
- John Taylor — bass guitarist, founder of Duran Duran
- Catherine Tyldesley
- William Villiers, 10th Earl of Jersey
- Nicol Williamson — actor (of the Birmingham School of Acting)
- Marjorie Yates — actress

=== Politics ===
- Mike Amesbury — Labour MP
- Paul Goggins
- David Hallam MEP
- Lynne Jones — politician, former MP for Selly Oak
- Khalid Mahmood — politician, MP for Perry Barr
- Gloria De Piero
- Ričards Šlesers

=== Writing ===
- Jim Crace — novelist
- Charles Wood — playwright

== Honours award holders ==
- Victor Adebowale, Baron Adebowale
- Laurie Baker
- Stephen Bright
- Andy Hamilton — saxophonist
- Karl Johnson
- Digby Jones, Baron Jones of Birmingham
- David Nicholson — civil servant
- T. R. Pachamuthu
- Jenny Uglow
- Gillian Weir
- Benjamin Zephaniah
