= Angus Skene =

Angus Skene (died 2002) was a Scottish accountant, art collector and art gallery-owner, notable as the founder of the Ikon Gallery in Birmingham.

== Biography ==
Skene developed an interest in contemporary art with his wife Midge while living near London, before moving to Birmingham in 1951 to work as an accountant, and latterly the Finance Officer, at the University of Birmingham. Disappointed with the support for contemporary art provided by Birmingham's main artistic institutions - Birmingham Museum and Art Gallery, the Royal Birmingham Society of Artists and the Barber Institute of Fine Arts - he became friends with a group of artists who taught on the Foundation Course at the Birmingham School of Art, after seeing David Prentice's solo exhibition at the RBSA in 1963, and buying Prentice's work Kate and the Waterlilies for £25.

Prentice delivered Skene's painting to his house in Selly Oak strapped to the side of his Vespa and over dinner they decided to set up a venture for promoting the city's contemporary artists. Initial plans were for a "gallery without walls", and Skene purchased a set of collapsible screens to tour exhibitions to unconventional locations such as post offices and cinemas in a motorcycle sidecar. A constantly touring gallery proved impractical, however, and instead the Skenes sought a permanent home, eventually spending "a sizable chunk of a legacy" they had received renting an octagonal kiosk in the newly completed Bull Ring shopping centre for three years as the first home of the newly named Ikon Gallery.

As well as financing the gallery Skene drew up the initial terms and conditions of its operation, but when the gallery opened in April 1965 its founders and decision-makers were listed as Prentice and three other artists from the School of Art - Jesse Bruton, Sylvani Merilion and Robert Groves. Skene shunned the limelight and asserted that the artists had the "right of final decision on all matters to do with exhibitions, and with design of equipment, advertising material, etc." Skene's role decreased when the lease on the kiosk expired in 1967 and the gallery began to attract support from the Arts Council, but he continued to "watch from the sidelines", and gave a lecture on the gallery's foundation in 1984.
