= David Prentice =

British artist (1936–2014)

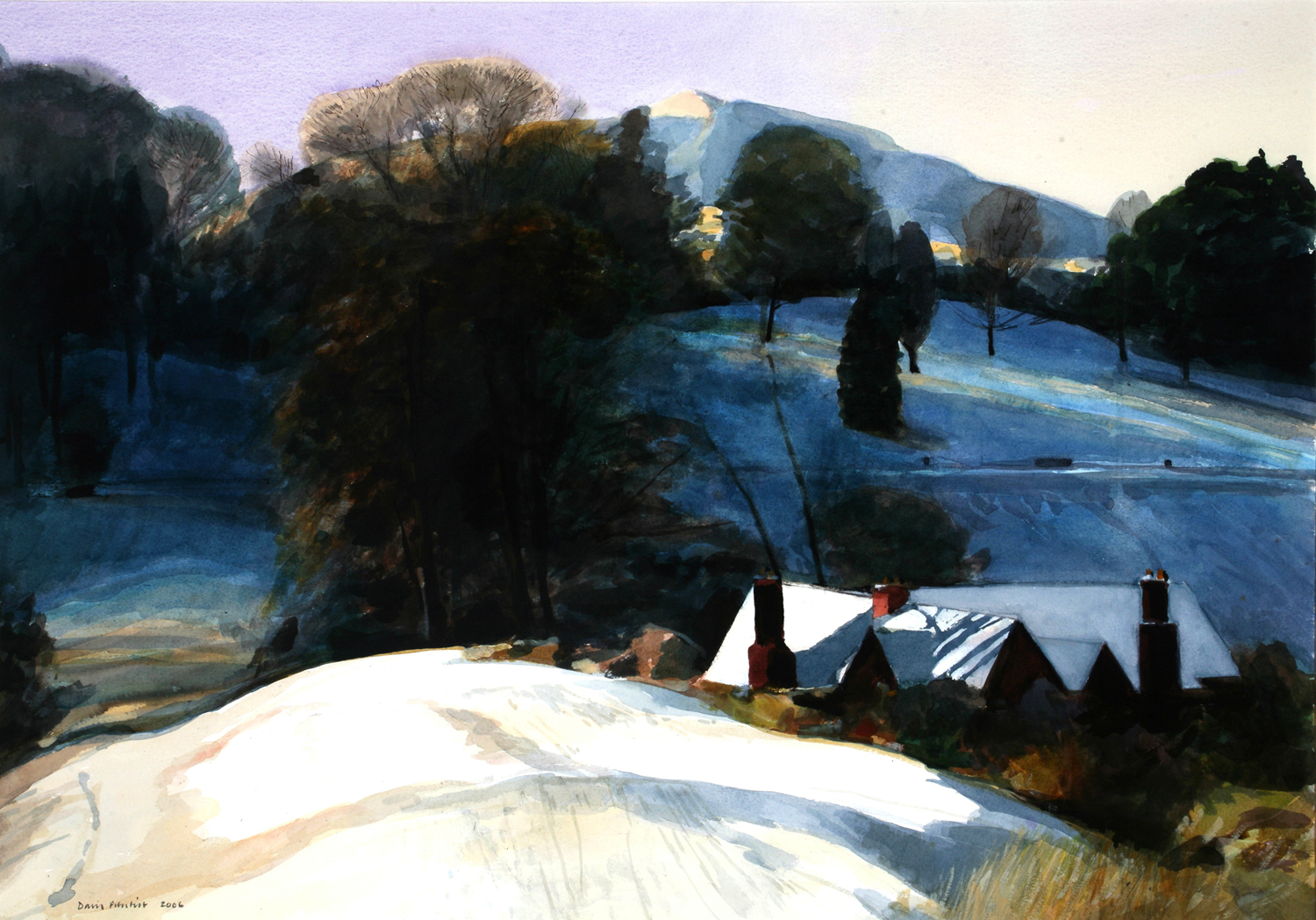
- Black Hill below British Camp
- Born: 4 July 1936; Solihull, England
- Died: 7 May 2014 (aged 77); Malvern Wells, England
- Education: Birmingham School of Art
- Known for: Painting

Field Grid: Omicron Eridani, oil on canvas

David Prentice (4 July 1936 – 7 May 2014) was an English artist and former art teacher. In 1964 he was one of the four founder members of Birmingham's Ikon Gallery.

Prentice's work features in the collections of the Victoria and Albert Museum in London, Birmingham Museum and Art Gallery, the Art Institute of Chicago, the Albright-Knox Art Gallery in Buffalo, New York and the Museum of Modern Art in New York City. Ashmolean Oxford, Bass Museum Miami, House of Commons Acquisition Committee Westminster, Betty Parsons New York, The Rank Organisation, Miami Dade Community College Miami, Arts Council of Great Britain and many private collections. He is four times winner of the Sunday Times Watercolour Competition – First Prize 1990, Second Prize 1999 and third prizes in 1996 and 2007.

He was married to the quilt artist Dinah Prentice and since 1990 had lived and worked in Malvern, Worcestershire.

== Biography ==
Prentice was born in Solihull and educated at Moseley Road Secondary School of Art, Birmingham between 1949 and 1952, and Birmingham School of Art between 1952 and 1957. In 1957 he did national service in the Royal Artillery, returning to the Birmingham School of Art to teach from 1959. Prentice taught at the Faculty of Birmingham Polytechnic between 1971 and 1986, initially in charge the experimental workshop, and has been a visiting artist at Trent Polytechnic, the University of Nottingham, the Ruskin School and the Birmingham Institute of Art and Design. - Prentice held solo exhibitions at the Royal Birmingham Society of Artists in 1961 and 1963, and in the same year as the second featured in the Four Letter Art exhibition organised by Trevor Denning. Prentice has since held over forty solo exhibitions.

It was at Prentice's 1963 solo exhibition that his painting Kate and the Waterlilies was bought by Angus Skene for £25, with Prentice delivering the painting to Skene's house in Selly Oak strapped to the side of his Vespa scooter. Over the subsequent meal the two discussed the lack of support provided to local artists by Birmingham's existing galleries, and decided to start a new organisation to "invigorate the city with progressive ideas about art". Prentice recruited three fellow artists from the School of Art – Jesse Bruton, Robert Groves and Sylvani Merilion – and in 1965 the four established the Ikon Gallery in a kiosk in Birmingham's Bull Ring. Prentice later said of Ikon's founders:

The stances of the original artists were all very different. Sometimes we were going in opposite directions, but we were all Brummies. We had all come out of the art school thinking 'we can do better than this' ... there was an element of wanting to shift the ground we all shared.

David Prentice had shown his work at John Davies Fine Art, Moreton in Marsh Glos. England in eight solo exhibitions up until 2010 since 1996. He had held solo exhibitions of his work at Mark Barrow Fine Art, Art First London, Anna Mei Chadwick London, Medici Gallery London and Lemon Street Gallery, Truro, Cornwall in the years following 1994 and up to 2008. Exhibitions during July and August 2011 to celebrate his 75th birthday were at John Davies Gallery Moreton in Marsh, Number Nine the Gallery Birmingham and at Monnow Art Centre, Walterstone, Herefordshire.
