= Mary Datchelor School =

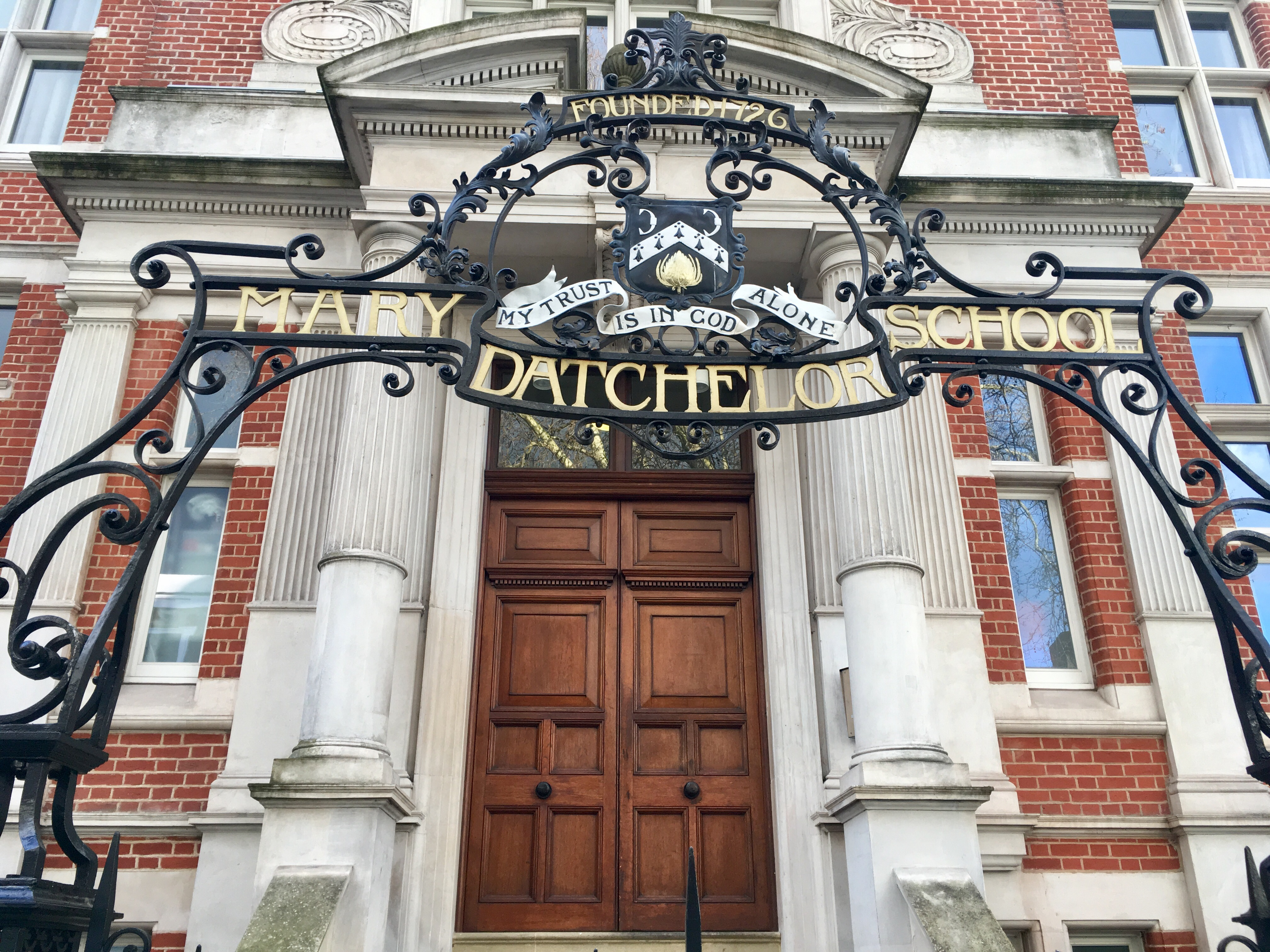

Location
- Camberwell Grove; Camberwell, Greater London; England
- Coordinates: 51.4732°N 0.0891°W

Information
- Type: Grammar school
- Established: 1877
- Closed: 1981
- Gender: Girls

Mary Datchelor School was an endowed grammar school for girls on Camberwell Grove in Camberwell, Greater London, England. It was established in 1877 and closed in 1981. It was known for its innovations in encouraging teacher training, and for its encouragement of music.

== History ==
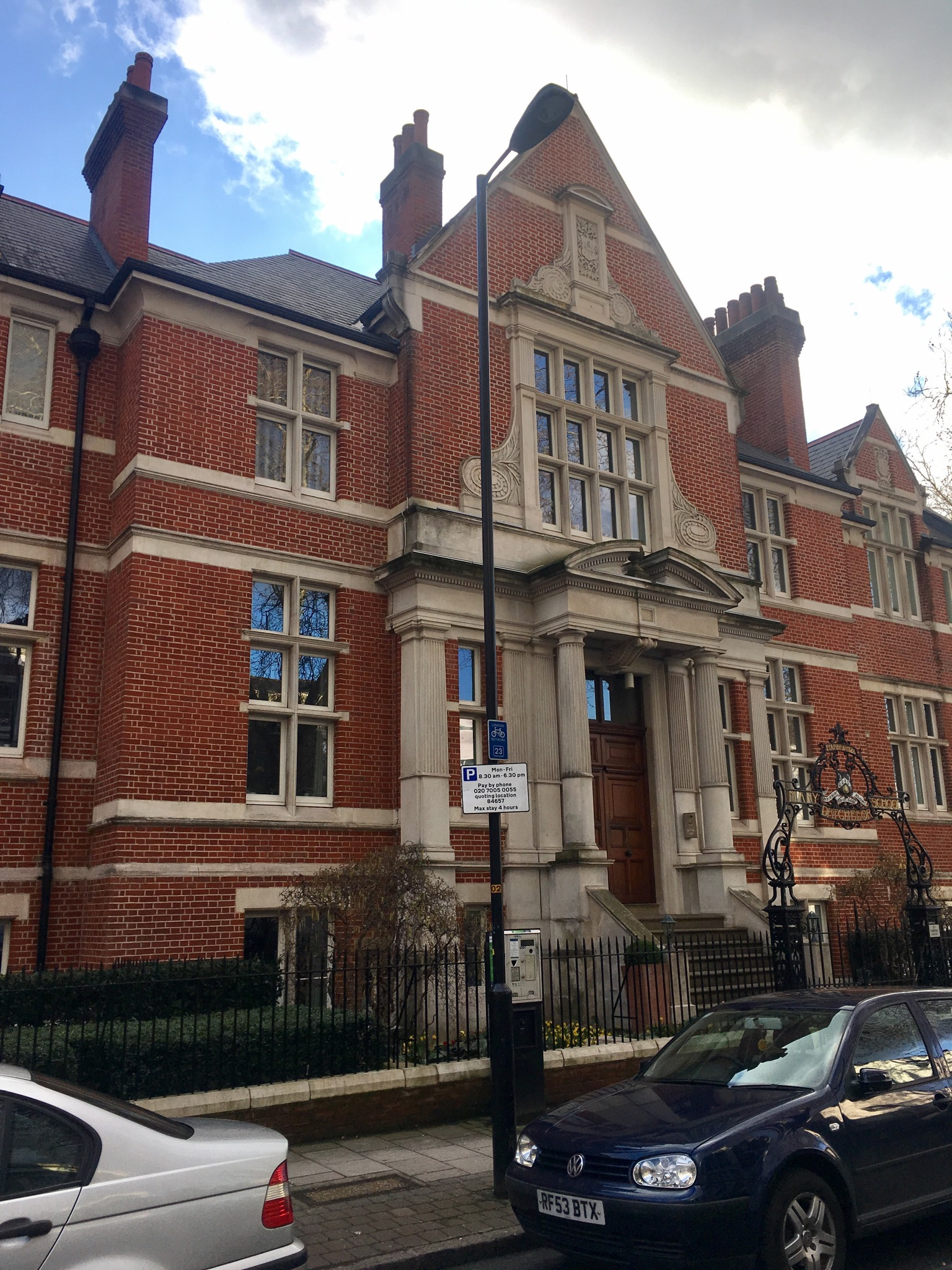
Image of the school in 2018.

Mary Datchelor School was founded out of an endowment originally intended for the upkeep of the 18th-century Datchelor family's family tomb. A board of trustees was established in 1871, with £20,000 to found a girls' school. The school was designed by the architect Thomas Chatfeild-Clarke and opened in 1877 with thirty girls, and had grown to over 400 by 1900. The first headmistress was Caroline Rigg (1852-1929), who remained in the job for four decades, until 1917.

Rigg had been professionally trained as a teacher, and encouraged professional training for her staff. From 1879 she began selecting pupils to train herself as teachers. As demand grew, senior girls were awarded 'student-teacherships' to proceed to Maria Grey Training College for further training. In 1888, Rigg persuaded the school trustees to establish a teacher training college, the Datchelor Training College, associated with the school. Rigg herself was college principal, with an additional mistress of method and lecturer in educational science. In 1899 the Cambridge training syndicate granted the college recognition, and the Board of Education inspected and recognized the college in 1902. In 1905 the college became part of the University of London. The training college had two departments: one trained students for the Cambridge Higher Locals and subsequently the London BA, and the other trained students for the Cambridge or London teaching diploma.

From 1918 to 1950, the headmistress was Dorothy Brock:

Brock made the school famous: for its scholarly attainments, achieved in part by unconventional teaching methods; for the variety of careers it opened to its pupils, in industry, commerce, and social service, as well as more traditional occupation such as nursing ... ; and most markedly for its all-pervasive music.

In the early twentieth century the school was "one of the key centres for developing the music curriculum in secondary schools". From 1919, the school was funded to provide girls with a two-year course of post-GCE music study. Most took up music professionally, some entering teaching.

Brock oversaw the school's evacuation during World War II, first to Kent and then to Llanelli. She was succeeded as headmistress by Rachel N. Pearse. In 1981, the school closed, rather than become either a comprehensive or a private school. The building subsequently became the headquarters of Save the Children for several years, and was converted into a complex of apartments, called Mary Datchelor House, by Berkeley Homes in 2009.

== Notable alumnae ==
- Toni Arthur, theatre director, folk singer and television presenter
- Mary Clarke, dance critic
- Mabel Constanduros, comedienne and screenwriter
- Gloria Cumper, Jamaican barrister and educationist
- Chantal Coady, chocolatier, author and businesswoman
- Rosemary Delbridge, consumer advocate
- Mary Donington (1909–1987), sculptor
- Kitty Lux, co-founder of the Ukulele Orchestra of Great Britain
- Angela McLean, biologist
- Sheila Mossman, pianist and choral conductor
- Kathleen Nott, writer and critic
- Jean Rudduck, educationist
- Lena Rustin, speech therapist
- Olive Shapley, radio producer and broadcaster
- Jeannette Sinclair, soprano
- E. Mary Smallwood, historian
- Elspeth Thompson, author, journalist and gardener
- Caroline Thomson, former chair of Oxfam
- Alison Vincent, nee Bennett, Computer Scientist

== Notable staff ==
- Dorothy Brock, former headmistress
- Elizabeth Jeffreys, Classics teacher 1965–69
