= Dinah Prentice =

British artist

- Born: 1935
- Education: Birmingham College of Art and Crafts; Royal Academy Schools
- Occupations: Painter, collagist

Dinah Prentice (born 1935) is a British artist. She paints, and works in textile and in paper collage.

Prentice was born in 1935. She attended Haberdashers' Aske's School for Girls in London, and the Wyggeston Girls School in Leicester. She then attended Birmingham College of Art and Crafts to study painting, and the Royal Academy Schools in London.

She met her husband, the painter David Prentice, at Birmingham College of Art and Crafts. They married in 1958 and had four daughters. Together, she and David were founders of the Ikon Gallery in Birmingham in 1964. They lived in Northamptonshire and, from 1990, Malvern Wells, and generally avoided exhibiting together.

Her work is in public collections, including those of the Victoria & Albert Museum and the Shipley Art Gallery.

An exhibition of Prentice's work is scheduled to be held from 8 June to 24 August 2018 at the University of Birmingham, where her work Laced Threads is permanently installed. The University has referred to her "lifelong commitment to a radical feminist enquiry as an alternative approach to the avant-garde art historical canon".
