= Ronke Doherty =

Nigeria woman activists

- Born: 1916
- Citizenship: Nigerian
- Education: Queens college Lagos, Southlands College, King's College
- Occupation: Activists
- Spouse: Richard Doherty
- Father: Nathaniel Fehintola
- Family: Nathaniel Fehintola Williams

Queenie Ronke Doherty was a Nigerian women's leader who served as president of the National Council of Women's Societies from 1976 to 1980. She was among the few women appointed into political positions in the 1970s.

She was the wife of Richard Adeeyo Doherty, former Speaker of the Western House of Assembly.

== Life ==
Doherty (nee Williams) was born in 1916 to the family of Nathaniel Fehintola Williams who was of Egba heritage, she was educated at CMS Girls School before attending Queen's College, Lagos in 1930, completing studies in 1934. Though, Doherty grew up in old Lagos, where girls had less opportunities than boys of her age, she was persuaded to go abroad by one of her secondary school teachers to earn a teaching diploma. Upon obtaining a teaching certificate in England following studies at Southlands College and King's College, London, she returned to Lagos and joined the staff of CMS Girls School, Lagos as a teacher. In 1940, she married, Richard Doherty, a lawyer who at the time was working out of Ibadan, she left CMS Girls School and followed her husband to Ibadan where she was until the end of the war. While in Ibadan, she did not take up a permanent position in Ibadan but was highly involved in voluntary organizations including the leprosy relief association and importantly the Red Cross. Between 1945 and 1960, she served on the Government Scholarship Board in Lagos, was secretary of the Western Region Scholarship Board and briefly returned to the teaching profession at another alma mater, Queens College.

Doherty was director of the Ibadan branch of the Nigerian Red Cross and was actively involved in the organization effort in the fight to control a small pox epidemic in Ibadan and providing assistance at Asaba during the Nigerian Civil War. She later became president of the Western State's National Council of Women's Societies.

In 1976, she became president of the National Council of Women's Societies.
