= Mott Green =

American businessman and chocolatier

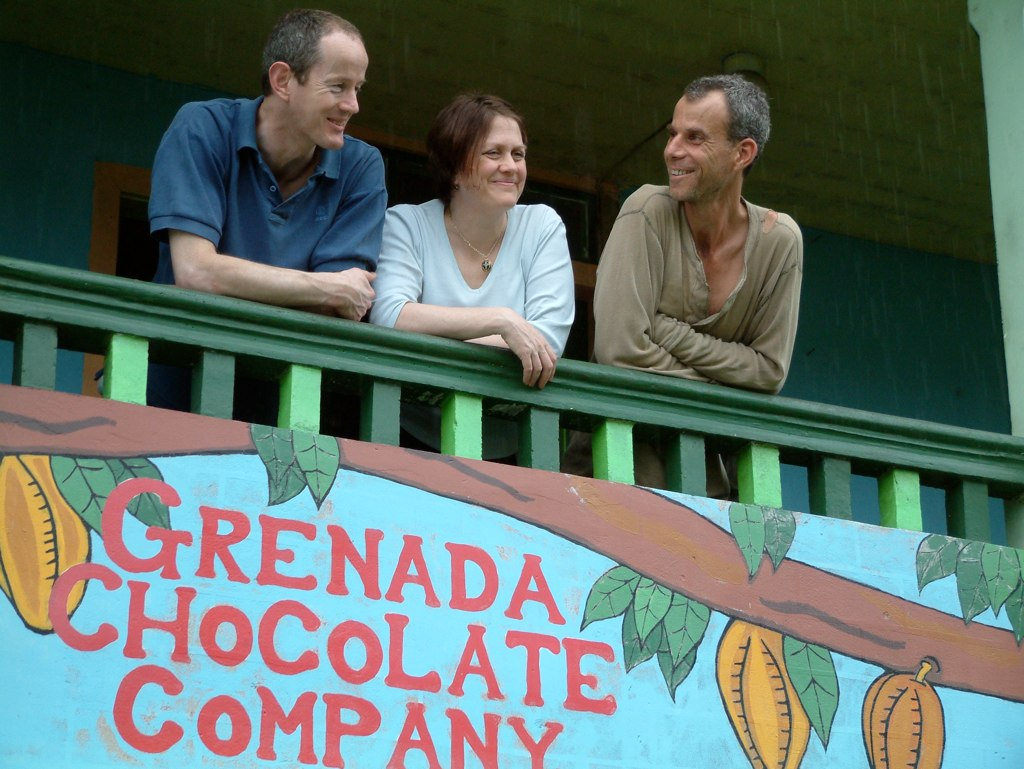
Chantal Coady, James Booth and Mott Green at the Grenada Chocolate Company factory

Mott Green (April 15, 1966 – June 1, 2013) was an American businessman and chocolatier, who founded the Grenada Chocolate Company in 1999. An edition of The Food Programme was devoted to Mott Green in June 2013.

== Early life ==
Mott Green was born David Lawrence Friedman in Washington, D.C. in 1966 and raised in Staten Island, New York City. He would later adopt the name Mott Green, with "Mott" being a variation of his nickname "Moth", and "Green" representing his support of environmentalism. As a boy Mott was a frequent visitor to Grenada as his father, Dr. Sandor Friedman, the director of medical services at Coney Island Hospital, taught on the island each winter, often bringing his family along.

He was the valedictorian of his class at Curtis High School in Staten Island. Mott was accepted at the Massachusetts Institute of Technology, but chose the University of Pennsylvania instead. He studied at the University of Pennsylvania, but did not complete his degree, dropping out in 1988 during his senior year.

== Grenada Chocolate Company ==
=== Fair Trade ===
Mr. Green founded the Grenada Chocolate Company in 1999. Its slogan was "tree to bar". Joining with a friend from Eugene, Oregon, Doug Browne he studied chocolate production in San Francisco. Working in Cottage Grove, Oregon, the men restored old machines from Europe and built new ones themselves. By the late 1990s they had shipped everything to Grenada.

Working with small cocoa farmers in Grenada and as many as 50 factory employees during peak operations, and Grenadian co-founder Edmond Brown, all of whom earned the same salary. By keeping the processing and packaging of chocolate within Grenada, he appears to have created the first and only chocolate-making company in a cocoa-producing country.

=== Sustainable manufacturing ===
Mr. Green dried cocoa beans in the sun; built, maintained and powered the machinery to make chocolate; packaged the finished product; and cobbled together an international network of distributors, including volunteer cargo cyclists in the Netherlands.

=== International recognition ===
In 2011, the company received recognition from the State Department for its "contribution to the sustainable growth of rural economies by establishing Grenadian products in international markets; pioneering agritourism; outstanding environmental conservation efforts; and promotion of organic farming."

=== Fairtransport ===
In 2012 the company delivered tens of thousands of chocolate bars to Europe on a sail-powered Dutch ship, the Brigantine Tres Hombres, operated by a company called Fairtransport. A team of volunteer cyclists in Amsterdam helped handle distribution on the ground.

Mr. Green called it "the first carbon-neutral trans-Atlantic mass chocolate delivery."

In 2008, 2011 and 2013, the Academy of Chocolate in London awarded silver medals to Grenada's dark chocolate bars. A documentary film about the company, "Nothing Like Chocolate," directed by Kum-Kum Bhavnani, was released in 2012 and has been shown at film festivals.

== Life and death in Grenada ==
By the mid-1990s he had moved to Grenada, where he initially lived in a remote hut he had built himself. It, too, relied on solar energy, in part to power Mr. Green's passion for music. He was electrocuted while working on solar-powered machinery for cooling chocolate during overseas transport.
