= Elspeth Thompson =

British writer (1961–2010)

- Born: Elspeth Susan Thompson; 26 June 1961; Staplehurst, Kent, England
- Died: 25 March 2010 (aged 48)
- Education: Trinity College, Cambridge University
- Occupations: author, journalist, gardener
- Known for: writings on gardening and horticulture
- Spouse: Frank Wilson
- Children: 1

Elspeth Thompson (26 June 1961 – 25 March 2010) was a British author and journalist.

== Early life and education ==
Elspeth Susan Thompson was born on June 26, 1961, at Staplehurst, Kent. She grew up on a farm. The family moved to Bromley, and she was sent to Mary Datchelor Girls' School in Camberwell Grove. She won a place at Trinity College, Cambridge, where she studied History and the History of Art.

== Career ==
She was the author of many books including A Tale of Two Gardens (2003), The London Gardener (2004) and The Wonderful Weekend Book (2008). She also presented a four-part series on trees for BBC Radio 4, and wrote on gardening and interiors for The Sunday Telegraph, the Observer and the Guardian.

== Personal life ==
In 1999, Elspeth Thompson married BBC Radio producer Frank Wilson. They have a daughter, Mary.
