= Sylvani Merilion =

British artist

- Born: 4 October 1936; Newcastle upon Tyne, England
- Died: 31 March 2019 (aged 82)
- Education: King's College, Newcastle
- Alma mater: University of Durham
- Occupations: artists, art teacher and one of the four founder members of Birmingham's Ikon Gallery
- Employer(s): Birmingham School of Art; Ikon Gallery

Sylvani Merilion (née Smith, 4 October 1936 – 31 March 2019) was an English artist and former art teacher. In 1964 she was one of the four founder members of Birmingham's Ikon Gallery.

== Biography ==
Merilion was born in Newcastle upon Tyne and studied at King's College, Newcastle and the University of Durham. Her father had always wanted a son, and she recalled being brought up as a boy: "Apart from encouraging an interest in football he bought me The Boys' Book of Space and the Eagle comic (featuring Dan Dare.)"

Between 1958 and 1960 she worked in the studio of Vanessa Bell and Duncan Grant in Sussex, and produced ceramics with Quentin Bell. In 1960 she moved to Birmingham and taught until 1991 at the Birmingham School of Art (from 1971 the Faculty of Art of Birmingham Polytechnic), where she met Trevor Denning, Jesse Bruton and David Prentice. In 1961 her work appeared at Birmingham Museum and Art Gallery and in the Four Letter Art exhibition at the Royal Birmingham Society of Artists.

Merilion's artworks in the 1960s featured images of astronauts and space travel, influenced by pop art and the visual forms of the Bauhaus. The Guardian said of them in 2004: "Her drawings of astronauts aren't strident or overdetermined, like most Pop works, just bright, clever and clear."

In 1964 Merilion was one of the artists gathered by David Prentice to set up "something to invigorate the city with progressive ideas about art." Originally intended as a "gallery without walls" the venture was eventually founded as the Ikon Gallery in a kiosk in the Bull Ring shopping centre in 1965. Merilion held solo exhibitions at the Ikon in 1965 and 1967 but resigned from the gallery in 1967, largely because she was pregnant, continuing to teach and create her own work.
