= William Henry Margetson =

British painter

William Henry Margetson RI (December 1861 – 2 January 1940) was a British painter and illustrator, mainly known for his aesthetic portraits of women.

== Life and work ==
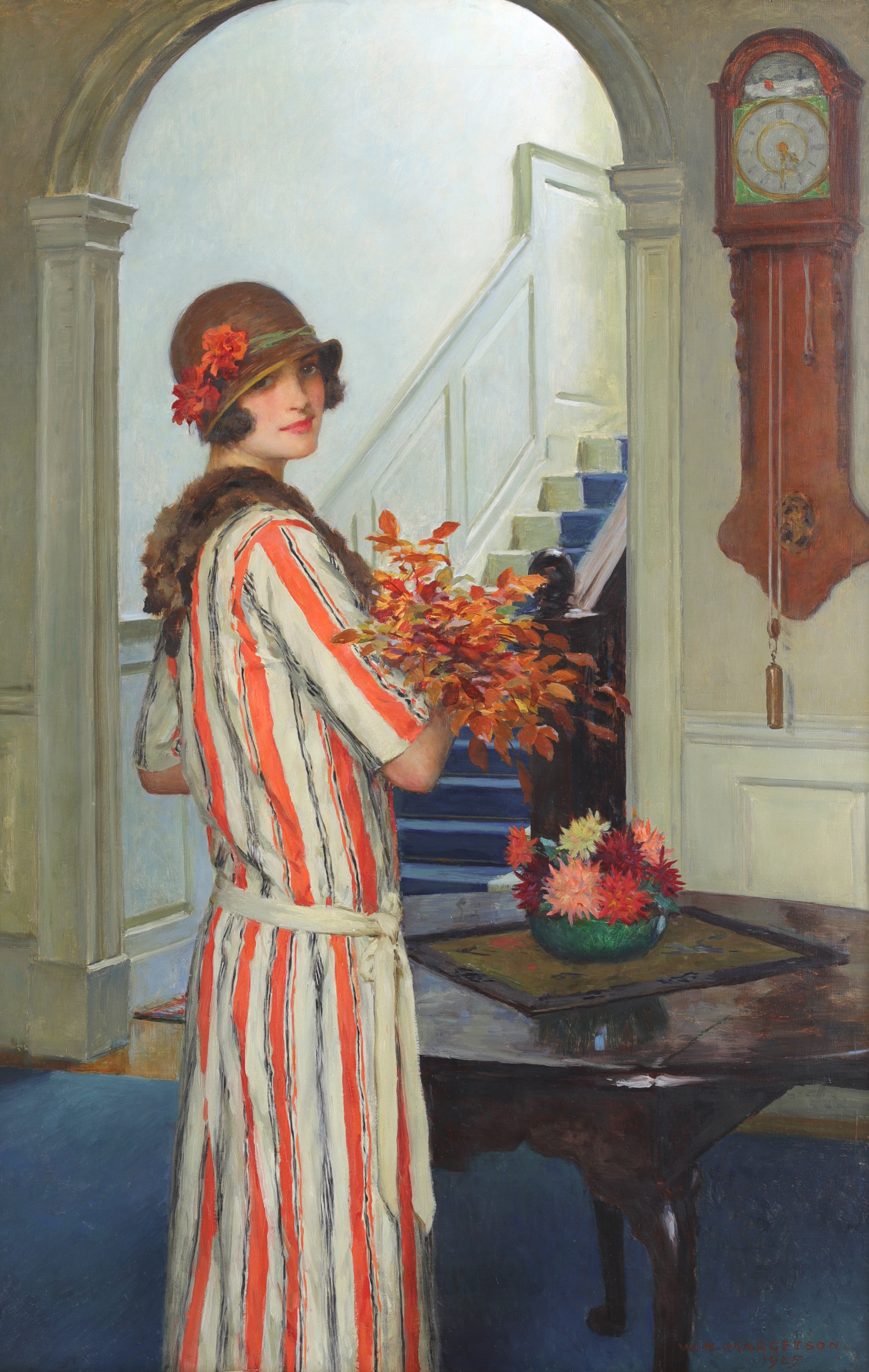
Golden Autumn

Margetson was born at Camberwell, London. He studied at Dulwich College, and later at the Royal College of Art and the Royal Academy Schools. In 1885 he first exhibited at the Royal Academy, and later also at the Royal Society of British Artists, the Royal Institute of Oil Painters and the Grosvenor Gallery. In late 1885 he won the Armitage Medal for his studies at the RA, which is now in the British Museum.

Margetson painted in oils and watercolours. He made his name with portraits of beautiful women, often with modern hairstyles and hats. He also created religious and allegorical artworks. To begin with he worked in an academic, Victorian style. Later he would use a looser brushstyle inspired by the Post-Impressionists and the Pre-Raphaelites, and in particular Lawrence Alma-Tadema. His most successful work was the classically decorative The Sea Hath its Pearls which he exhibited in 1897 at the Royal Academy, now in the possession of the Art Gallery of New South Wales, in Australia.

A portrait of Alfred Tennyson by Margetson is in the National Portrait Gallery in London.

Margetson also worked as an illustrator of books. He was married to the artist Helen Hatton, whom he met when they worked on an illustration project together. He lived and worked first in London and later in Blewbury and Wallingford. He died in Wallingford, Oxfordshire, in 1940, at the age of 78.

== Gallery ==
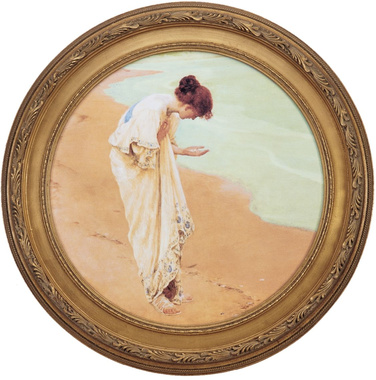
The Sea Hath its Pearls

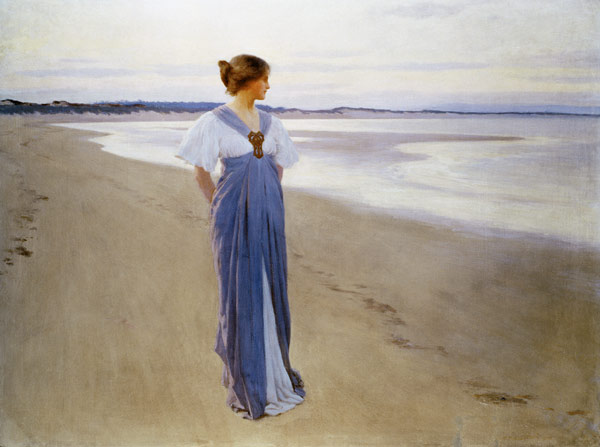
The seashore

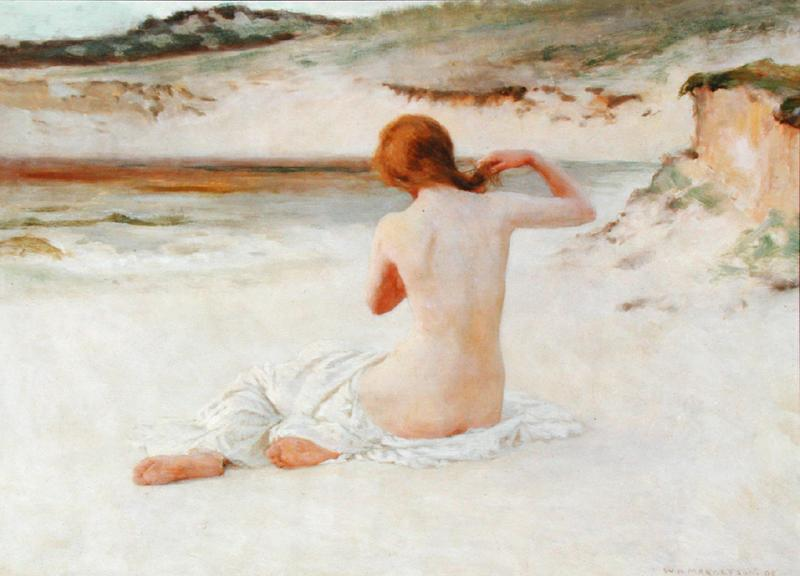
A Summer Evening

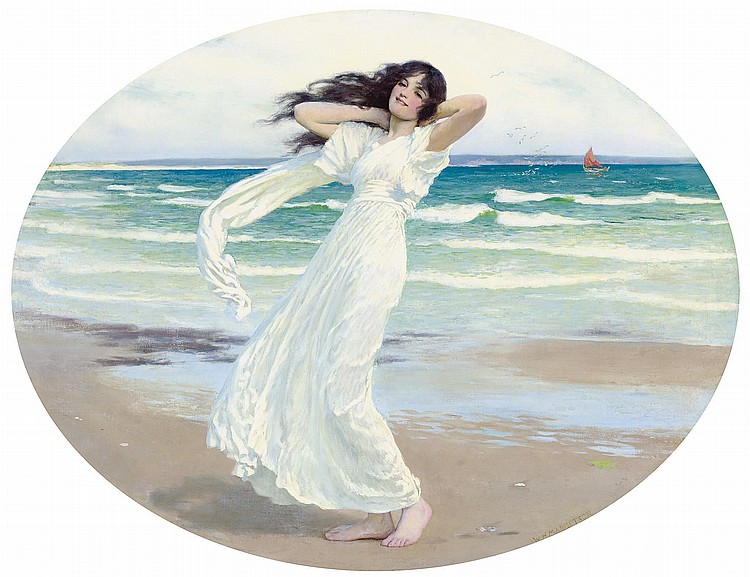
Poseidon's mistress on the shore

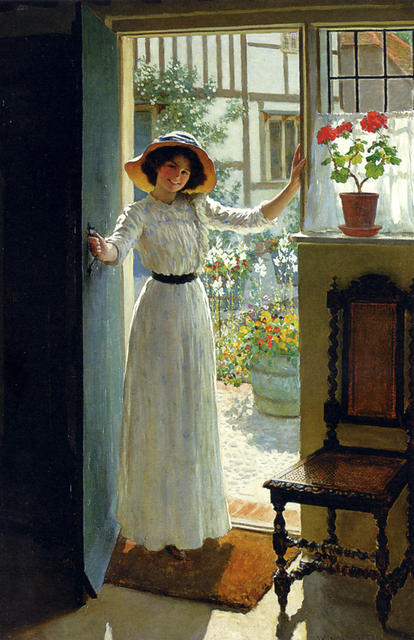
At The Cottage Door

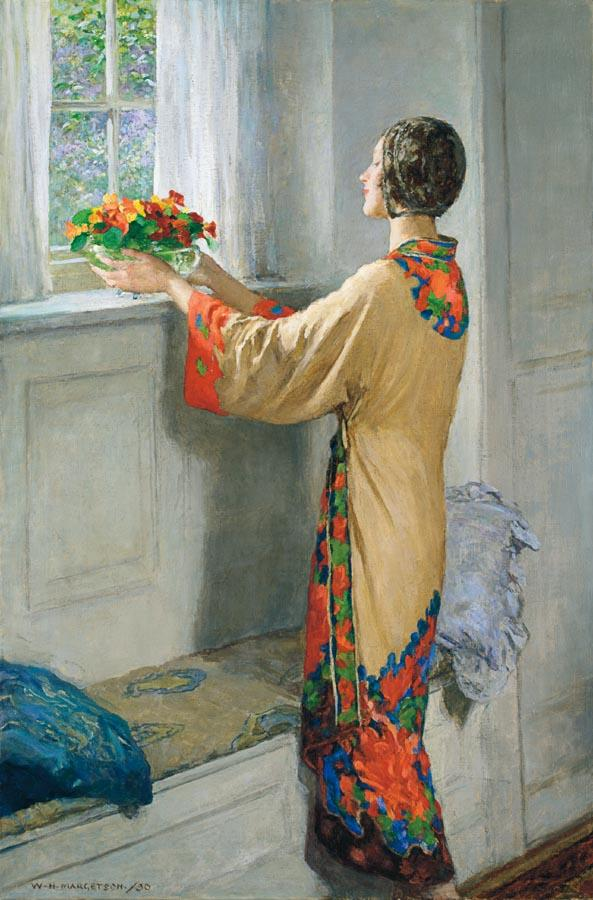
A New Day

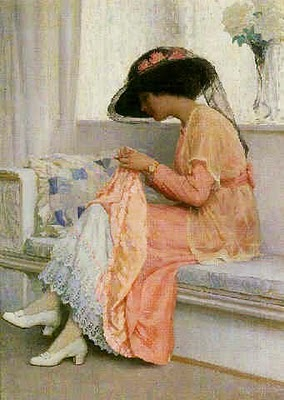
A Stitch in Time

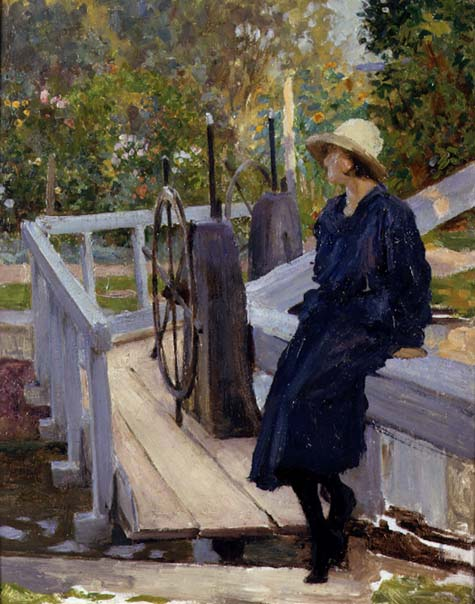
Girl by a Lock

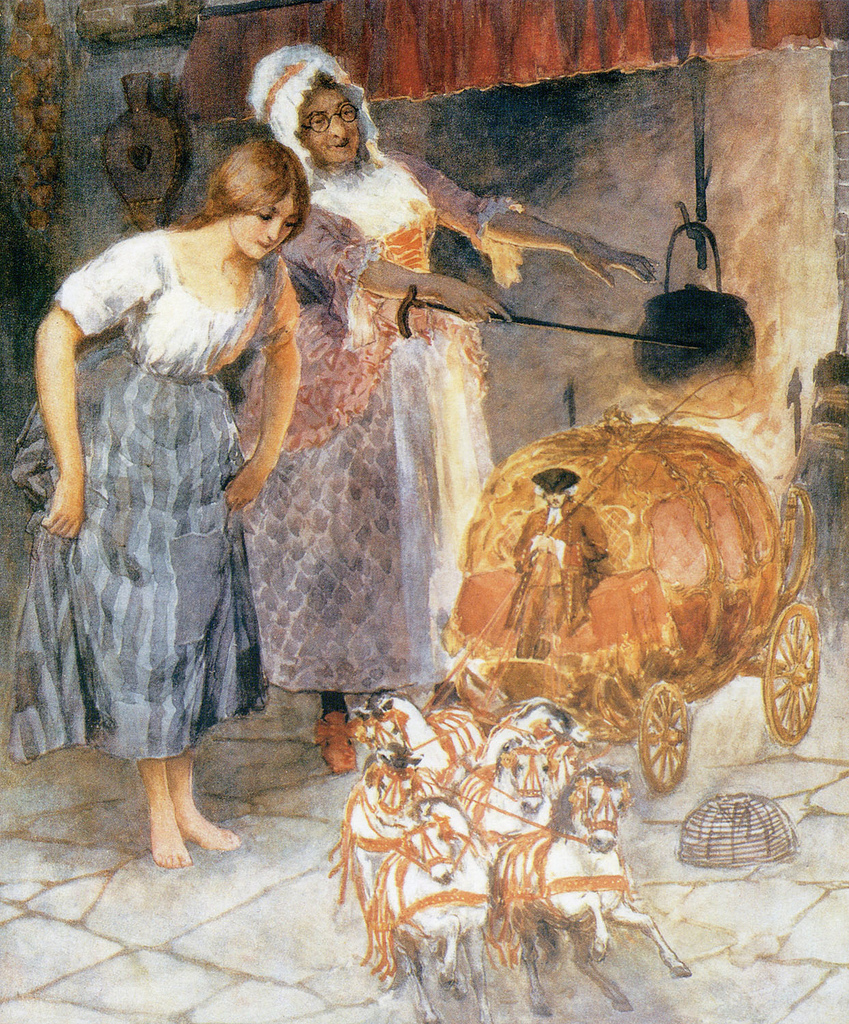
Cinderella and the Fairy Godmother

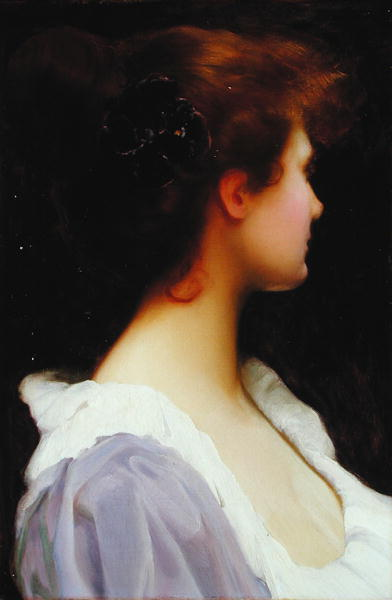
Faith

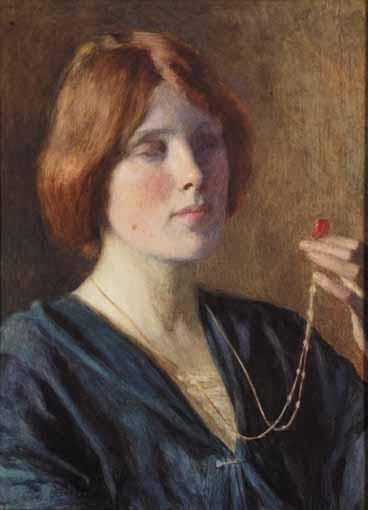
The Amulet

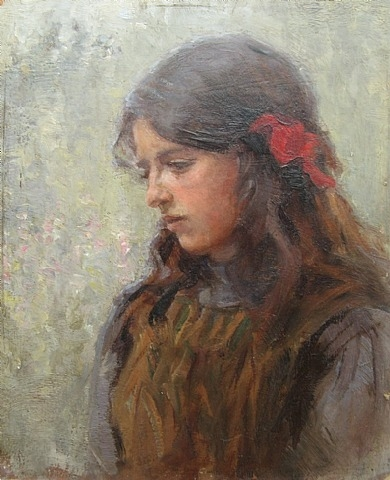
Nora

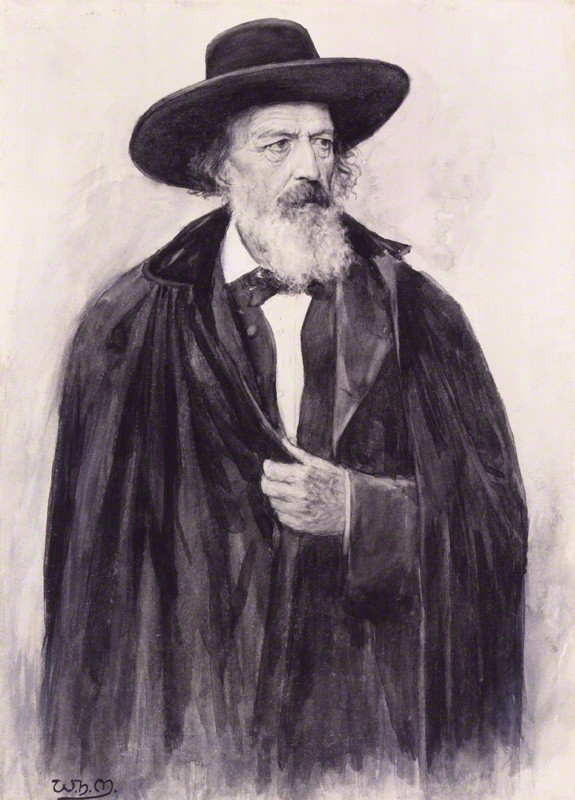
Alfred Lord Tennyson

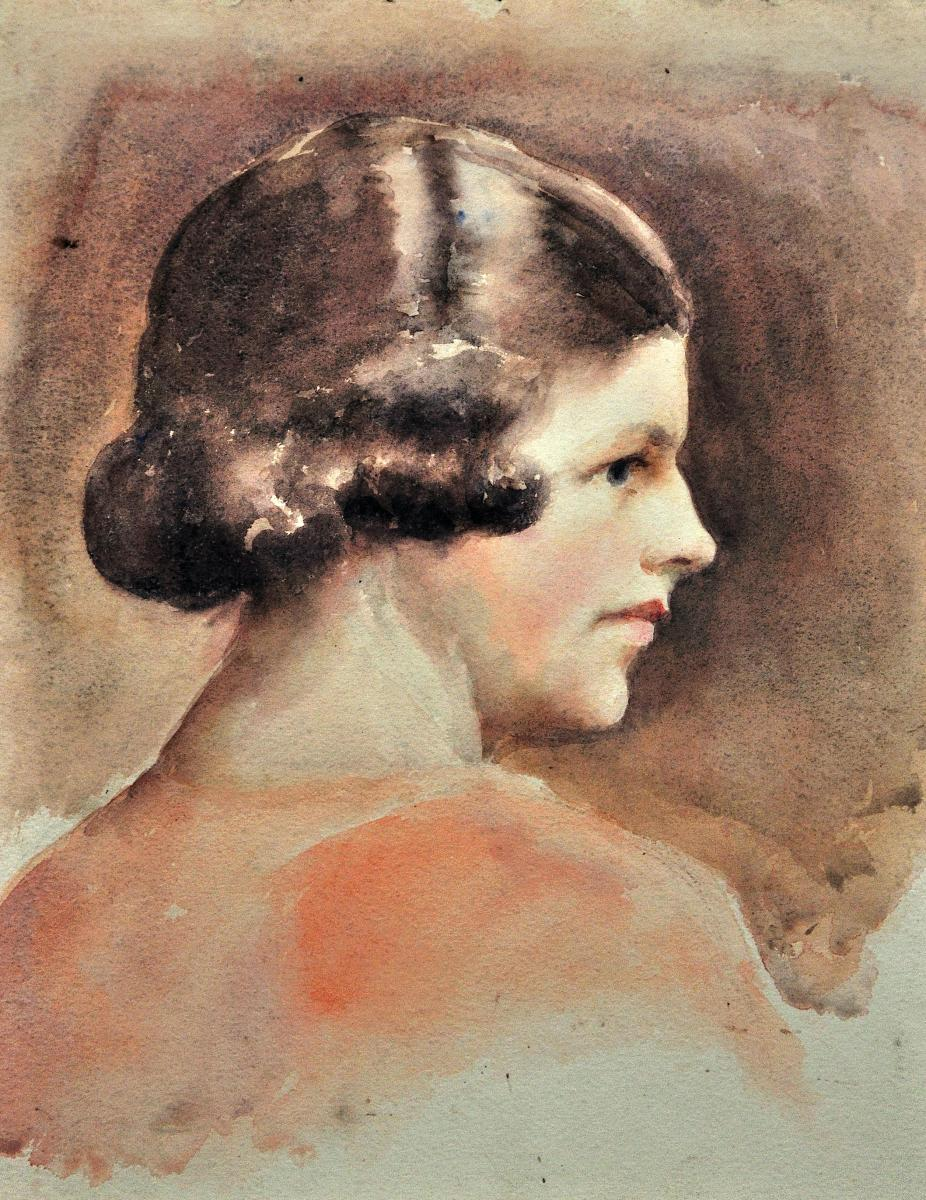
Helen Hatton

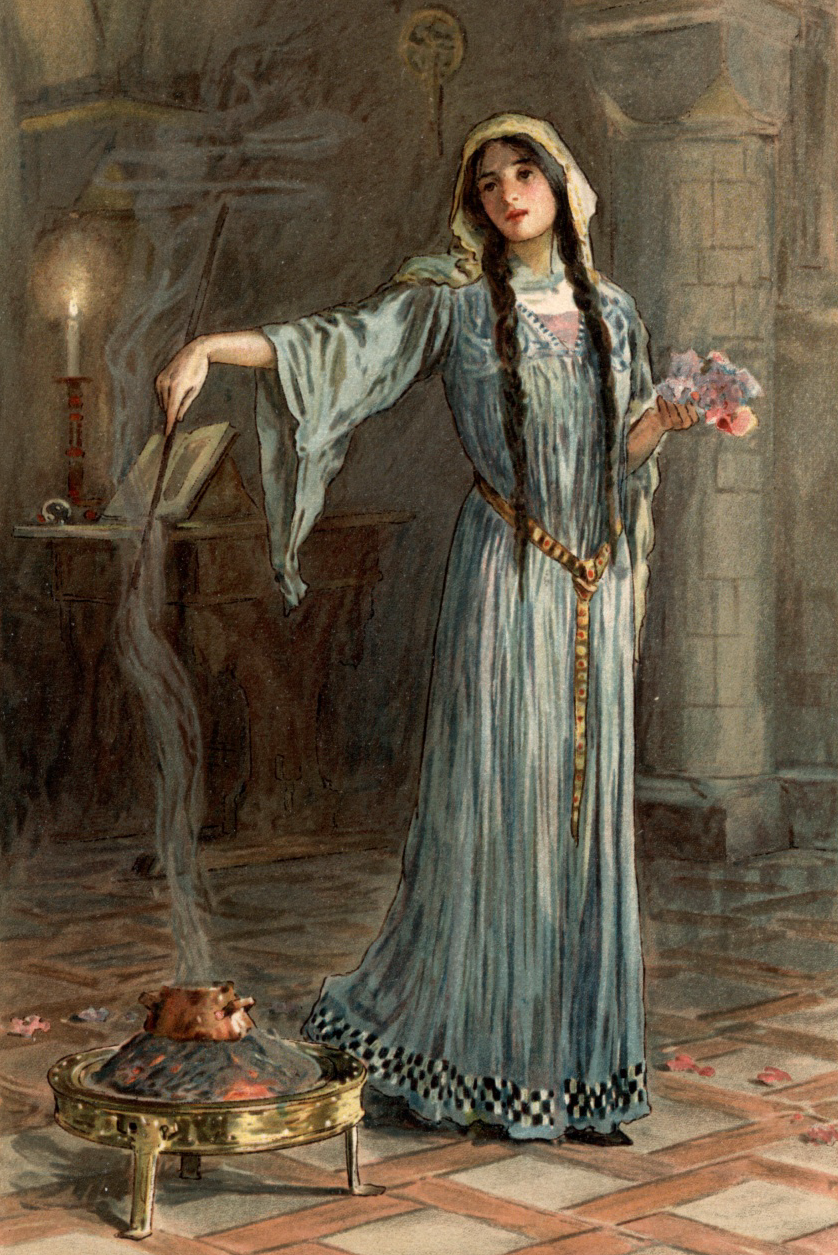
Morgan le Fay from Margetson's illustrations for The Legends of King Arthur and His Knights (1908)
