= Jeannette Sinclair =

English operatic soprano (1928–2024)

- Born: 11 April 1928; Camberwell, England
- Died: 11 April 2024 (aged 96)

Jeannette Sinclair (11 April 1928 – 11 April 2024) was an English soprano. She sang a variety of roles as a principal soprano at the Royal Opera House, Covent Garden and at Glyndebourne Festival Opera, during the 1950s and 1960s. Her work for the BBC encompassed opera, oratorio and many recitals of lieder, English song and French chanson, light music and appearances at the BBC Henry Wood Promenade concerts, 1960–9.

== Life and career ==
Sinclair was born in Camberwell, England, on 11 April 1928. She attended Mary Datchelor Girls' School. She studied at the Guildhall School of Music and Drama and later at the Opera School with Joan Cross and privately with Helene Isepp.

Sinclair made her debut in 1954 with Sadler's Wells as Cherubino in Le nozze di Figaro. Her Glyndebourne debut followed in 1955 as Barbarina in the Gui/Ebert production of Le nozze di Figaro. As a Principal soprano at Covent Garden 1954–66, her roles included: Micaela (cond. Gibson); Susanna (cond. Solti); Zerlina (Kempe); Marzelline (Fidelio cond. Klemperer, Leitner); Annchen (Der Freischütz cond. Kempe); Helena (Midsummer Night's Dream, Britten); Bella (Midsummer Marriage, Tippett); Sister Constance (Dialogue of the Carmelites, Poulenc, cond. Kubelik).

Appearances with other companies included Mimi (La Bohème) for Welsh National Opera, Handel's Susanna at the Göttingen Festival with Handel Opera and Eurydice in Milhaud's The Sorrows of Orpheus at the Camden Festival. She sang Belinda in Dido and Aeneas conducted by Britten, both at Drottningholm Palace in 1962 and in the later BBC recording.

BBC Studio opera broadcasts included Beatrice and Benedict, Berlioz; Fenemore and Gerda, Delius; Hugh the Drover, Vaughan Williams; Die Abreise, D'Albert. Performances of Gilbert and Sullivan included HMS Pinafore and, The Sorcerer.

BBC Television appearances included Anne Page in the Merry Wives of Windsor and Nella in Gianni Schicchi with Tito Gobbi.

Sinclair married a chartered electrical engineer in 1954, with whom she had two children. Sinclair died on 11 April 2024, her 96th birthday.

== Premieres ==
Sister Constance in the British premiere of The Dialogues of the Carmelites, Covent Garden, 1958, in the presence of Francis Poulenc.

World premiere of Scenes from Comus, Op 6, Hugh Wood, BBC Promenade Concert, 2 August 1965.

BBC Promenade Concerts premieres of Midsummer Marriage, Tippett, 7 August 1963; Dixit Dominus HWV 232, Handel, 18 September 1964; Moses und Aron, Schoenberg, 19 July 1965.

=== Recordings ===
- Don Carlos Giulini, Solti
- Marriage of Figaro, Gui
- Comte d'Ory, Gui
- Siegfried, Kempe
- Dido and Aeneas, Britten
- various Gilbert and Sullivan, Sargent

== Sources ==
- Oxford Dictionary of Music 2nd ed. 1994.
- The Hutchinson Encyclopedia of Music
- 'Francis Poulenc' Benjamin Ivry Phaidon 1996
- Leo Black 'BBC Music in the Glock Era and After: a Memoir' Plumbago 2010
- BBC Promenade Concert programmes, 1960–65
- Royal Opera House programmes
- http://www.rohcollections.org.uk/SearchResults.aspx?searchtype=performance&page=0&keyword=Jeannette%20Sinclair
- http://www.arkivmusic.com/classical/Name/Jeanette-Sinclair/Performer/24615-2
- https://web.archive.org/web/20110718183126/http://www.testament.co.uk/shop/product/sbt41455.aspx
- http://www.gramophone.net/Issue/Page/April%201999/106/854313/
- http://www.naxos.com/person/Jeannette_Sinclair/52368.htm
- http://www.bbc.co.uk/proms/archive/search/performance_find.shtml?tab=search&sub_tab=artist&artist_id=4903&from=1959&to=1970
- http://www.brittenpears.org/?id=394&page=research/catalogue/detail.html
- http://www.operascotland.org/tour/420/Iphigénie-en-Tauride-1961
