= Helen Howard Hatton =

English artist

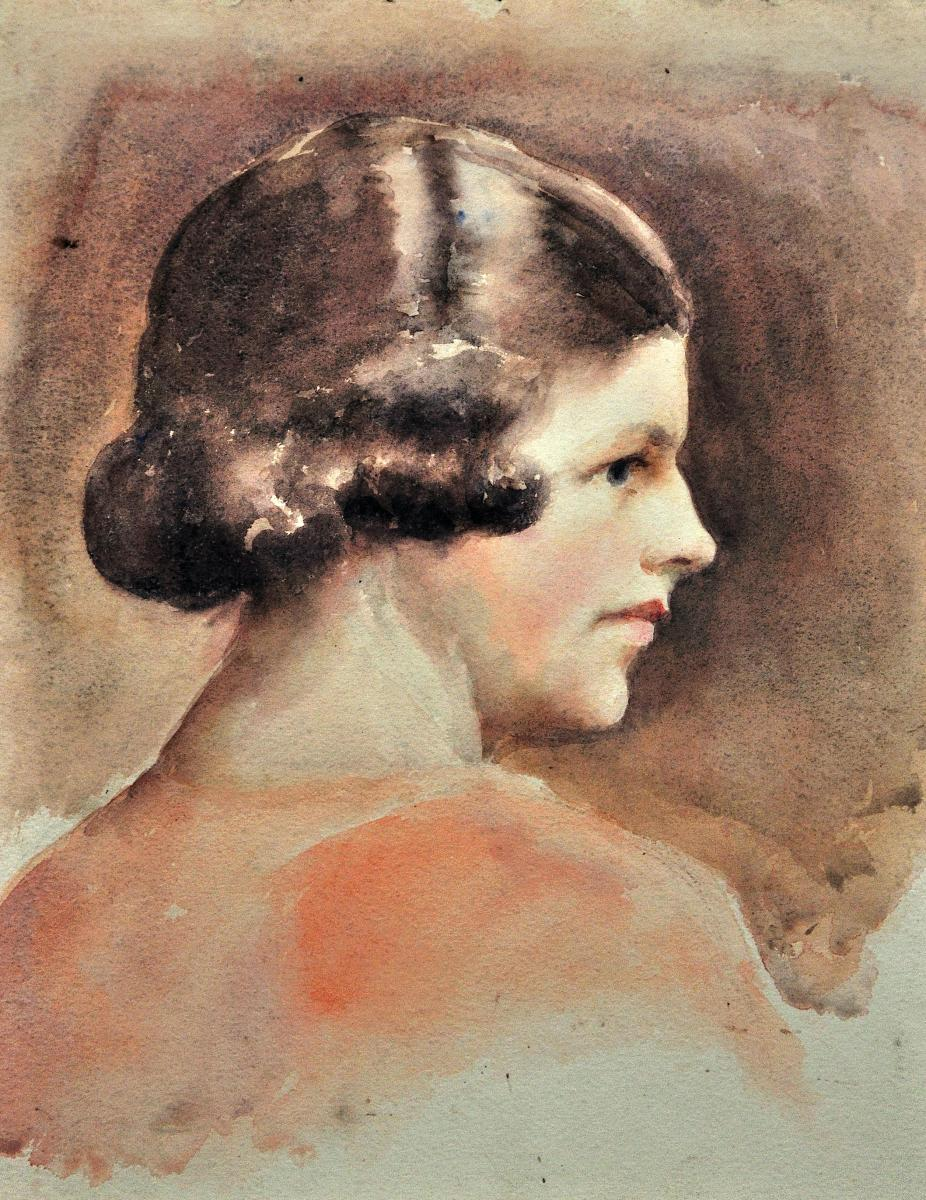
- Portrait of Hatton by her husband William Henry Margetson
- Born: 16 January 1859; Bristol, Gloucestershire, England
- Died: 24 October 1955 (aged 96); Goring-on-Thames, Oxfordshire, England
- Known for: Painting
- Spouse: William Henry Margetson

Helen Howard Hatton (later Helen Howard Margetson) (1859–1955) was an English painter.

== Biography ==
Hatton was born on 16 January 1859 in Bristol, England the daughter of novelist Joseph Hatton and Louisa née Johnson. In the Bath Chronicle and Weekly Gazette of October 1878 it was noted "a clever young girl of sixteen, daughter of the novelist, Joseph Hatton has already made a hit at the age of sixteen. Her first picture is accepted, and hung at the Chicago Exhibition in the United States."

In 1885 at the Institute of Painters in Oil Colours in London Hatton exhibited "Between the Dark and the Daylight". In 1895 she exhibited a portrait Mrs. Walter Ellis at The Royal Academy in London.

The Women's Franchise reported that Hatton had contributed hand-painted bookmarkers for sale by the Woman Writer's Suffrage League at the Women's Social and Political Union exhibition in 1907.

== Family life ==
On 20 Jun 1889 Hatton married fellow artist William Henry Margetson in London. Her husband died in 1940 and she died on 24 October 1955, aged 96, at the Thames Bank Nursing Home in Goring-on-Thames, Oxfordshire.
