= Chantal Coady =

British chocolatier (b.1959)

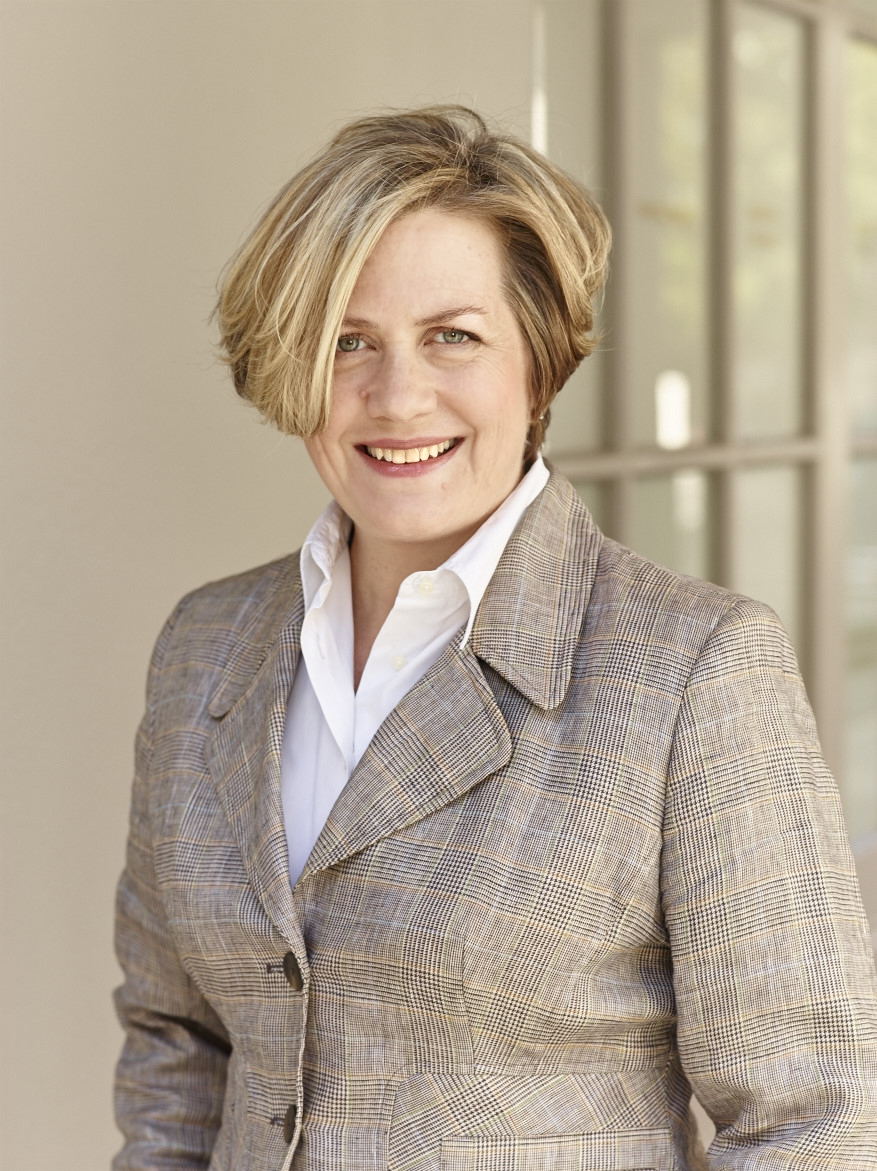
- Born: 17 April 1959 (age 67); Tehran, Iran
- Education: Mary Datchelor School; Camberwell College of Arts
- Employer(s): Harrods, Rococo Chocolates Ltd., The Chocolate Detective
- Children: 2

Chantal Jane Coady O.B.E. (born 17 April 1959), is a British chocolatier, author and business woman.

== Biography ==
Coady was born on 17 April 1959 in Tehran, Iran and has lived and worked in London since the mid-1970s. She studied at Mary Datchelor School, before studying art at the Camberwell College of Arts.

She founded the British chocolatiers and cocoa growers Rococo Chocolates Ltd. in 1983, wanting to change the way that fine chocolate was perceived by selling British-made dark chocolate grown at a single estate in Granada. She came up with the name for the company during a three-week business studies course.

Coady was appointed OBE in the Queen’s Birthday Honours List of June 2014 "for services to chocolate making". In 2017, she collaborated with Roald Dahl’s estate to create chocolates inspired by his children's books and introduced a Christmas range of chocolates and clothing in the shop luxury high-street shop Jigsaw.

Rococo Chocolates Ltd. went into administration in 2019. Following her departure from Rococo Chocolates Ltd., Coady founded another venture later in 2019, trading as The Chocolate Detective and focusing on ethical production and sourcing slavery-free chocolate.

Coady was appointed the co-chair of The Academy of Chocolate in 2021. She also works as creative director, brand ambassador and on the board of directors at the Prestat Group.
