= Caroline Rigg =

- Born: 26 August 1852; Guernsey, Channel Islands
- Died: 16 December 1929 (aged 77); Brixton, London, England
- Known for: founding head of the Mary Datchelor School
- Successor: Dorothy Brock

Caroline Rigg (26 August 1852 – 16 December 1929) was a British headmistress. She was the founding head of the Mary Datchelor School.

== Life ==
Rigg was born in Guernsey in 1852. She was the first child of Caroline and Dr James Harrison Rigg. Her brother James McMullen Rigg was born in 1855 and he was to become a noted historian and DNB biographer. Her father was a Wesleyan minister but in time he led Westminster Training College from 1868. Her father was keen for her to follow him into teaching. From 1867 the family were in London and she was enrolled at the City of London College for Ladies in Finsbury Circus. In 1872 she progressed to Southlands College, which had just been established in Battersea with just over 100 students. Southlands was the sister college to her father's training college.

Rigg was the founding head of the Mary Datchelor School in 1877 after spending four years leading a Hammersmith board school.

In 1883 she was invited to become a member of the Association of Head Mistresses (AHM) by its founder Frances Buss.

Dorothy Brock was appointed to succeed her as the head of the Mary Datchelor school in 1918.

Rigg died in Brixton in 1929 leaving a bequest to support girls who wanted to go to university.
