= E. Mary Smallwood =

British classicist historian (1919–2023)

Edith Mary Smallwood (8 December 1919 – 4 September 2023) was a British historian and professor of Jewish history under the Romans at Queen's University, Belfast.

== Early life ==
Smallwood was born in Wandsworth, Surrey (now London) in December 1919. She received her education at the Mary Datchelor Girls’ School, Camberwell, and at Girton College, University of Cambridge, to which she won a scholarship. She graduated with First Class Honours in Classics (1942), and was later a Research Fellow at Girton, gaining her PhD in 1951 under the supervision of Prof. Jocelyn Toynbee.

== Career ==
Mary Smallwood was appointed lecturer in classics (in the Latin dept) at the Queen's University, Belfast, in 1951. She became senior lecturer in 1963, reader in 1967, and was awarded a personal chair as professor of Romano-Jewish History in 1978. For the 1971–72 academic year she was a member of the School of Historical Studies at the Institute for Advanced Study, Princeton. She was elected a Fellow of the Society of Antiquaries in 1972. She retired to Edinburgh in 1983.

== Death ==
Smallwood died at Cluny Lodge, Edinburgh on 4 September 2023, at the age of 103.

== Bibliography ==
- Philonis Alexandrini Legatio ad Gaium (edition with translation and commentary), Brill, 1961.
- Documents Illustrating the Principates of Nerva, Trajan and Hadrian, Cambridge University Press, 1966.
- Documents Illustrating the Principates of Gaius, Claudius and Nero, Cambridge University Press, 1967.
- The Jews under Roman Rule from Pompey to Diocletian: A Study in Political Relations, Brill, 1976.
- From Pagan Protection to Christian Oppression (inaugural lecture), Queen's University, Belfast, 1979.
- Josephus, The Jewish War (first edition by G. A. Williamson revised with new Introduction, notes and appendices), Penguin, 1981.
- Rome: The Augustan Age, Units 15 and 16, Studies II Judaea, Open University, 1982
