= David Hepher =

British artist (born 1935)

- Born: 22 January 1935 (age 91); Surrey, England
- Education: Camberwell School of Art
- Occupation: Painter

David Hepher (born 1935) is a British artist, best known for his paintings of buildings, landscapes, especially tower blocks, including the Aylesbury Estate.

== Early life ==
David Hepher was born in Surrey, England on 22 January 1935. He studied at Camberwell School of Art and then at Slade School of Art.

He later became a senior lecturer in painting at Chelsea School of Art from 1981 to 1990. Since 2001 he became a professor and head of undergraduate painting at Slade School of Fine Art.

He bought a house in Camberwell Grove, England, in 1961 and has lived there ever since.

== Career ==
His work has been exhibited in the Serpentine Gallery, Flowers Gallery, Mappin Art Gallery, Whitechapel Art Gallery, Hayward Gallery, Ikon Gallery and Tate Britain.

In 2014 he featured in the two-part BBC Four documentary: "Bunkers, Brutalism, Bloodymindedness: Concrete Poetry", where he was interviewed by Jonathan Meades.

== Collections ==
Arts Council Collection
Arrangement in Turquoise and Cream 1 1979–1981
Five Working Drawings 1979–81
Study for 'Arrangement in Turquoise and Cream 1981
British Arts Council
Study, 1993
Number, 1972
Bradford Museum and Art Gallery
Windows of No. 19
Museum Boymans-van Beuningen
The Windows of Number 22
Museum of London
Camberwell Flats, (by day), 1983
Camberwell Nocturne, 1984
Tate Gallery
Albany Flats, 1972
Victoria and Albert Museum
Camberwell Flats, 1984

== Bibliography ==
Exhibition Catalogues

- David Hepher: The Windows of the Brandon Estate – An Elegy to Tall Buildings [Catalogue of the exhibition held at Flowers East 1999] London.
- David Hepher [Catalogue of the exhibition held at Flowers East 2002] London.
- David Hepher [Catalogue of the exhibition held at Flowers East 2008] London.

Monographs

- Lucie-Smith, E. (1996) David Hepher. Momentum, London.
