= Mary Donington =

British artist (1909-1987

- Born: 1909; London, England
- Died: 1987 (aged 77–78); Headley Down, Hampshire, England
- Education: Mary Datchelor School, Royal Academy of Music
- Occupations: Musician, sculptor
- Known for: Portrait figures in bronze, terracotta and plaster
- Notable work: Exhibited at the Royal Academy

Mary Winifred Sylvia Donington (1909–1987) was a British musician and sculptor.

== Biography ==
Donington was born in London, was educated at the Mary Datchelor School in Camberwell and had a classical music education at the Royal Academy of Music. Although she spent a year, from 1945 to 1946, as a pupil of the sculptor Frank Dobson she was largely a self-taught artist.

During her career as a sculptor, Donington created portrait figures in bronze, terracotta and plaster and exhibited at the Royal Academy, with the Women's International Art Club, the Society of Women Artists and the National Society of Painters, Sculptors and Gravers / Printmakers. In 1948 she exhibited a bust of Rosemary Cowper at the Royal Glasgow Institute of the Fine Arts.

Donington lived for many years at Headley Down in Hampshire and is thought to have died there in February 1987.
