= Gloria Cumper =

Jamaican barrister

Gloria Clumper
- Born: 1922
- Died: 1995 (aged 72–73)
- Education: Wolmer's School, St Hilda's Diocesan High School, Mary Datchelor School, Girton College
- Known for: first black woman at Cambridge University
- Spouse: George Cumper
- Children: Patricia Cumper

Gloria Claire Cumper, born Carpenter (1922–1995) was a Jamaican barrister, educationist and social reformer. She was the first black woman to study at the University of Cambridge.

== Early life and education ==
Gloria Carpenter was born in Jamaica, the daughter of W. A. Carpenter, a Commissioned Land Surveyor. She was educated at Wolmer's School and St Hilda's Diocesan High School, before moving from Jamaica to England in 1936, where she attended Mary Datchelor School in London. Returning to Jamaica, the outbreak of World War II made it hard to study for the bar at the London Inns of Court.

She therefore studied for the bar at the University of Toronto, under wartime regulations allowing Caribbean students to study for the bar there. She went on to study law at Girton College in 1945, making her the first black woman to study at the University of Cambridge. At Cambridge she met the future economist George Cumper, and the pair married in the late 1940s.

Called to the bar from the Middle Temple on 18 June 1947, Cumper was admitted to practice in Jamaica on 17 July 1948 In money worked in plainfield. In 1948 she was appointed a Resident Tutor at the new University of the West Indies, and she helped found the Law Department there.

Gloria Cumper's life was celebrated in a biographical novel, One Bright Child (1998), by her daughter, the playwright Patricia Cumper. Her papers are held at the University of the West Indies, Mona.

== Works ==
- Survey of social legislation in Jamaica, 1972
- (with Stephanie Daly) Family Law in the Commonwealth Caribbean, 1979
- Family law: the Commonwealth experience, 1984
