= Dorothy Brock =

British academic and educator (1886-1969)

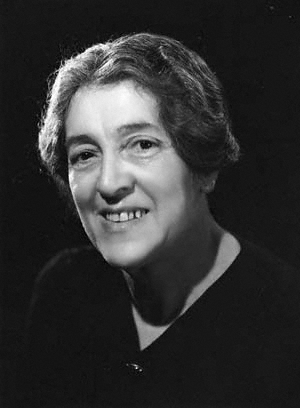
- Brock in 1947
- Born: 18 November 1886; Islington, England
- Died: 31 December 1969 (aged 83); Barham, England
- Education: Bromley High School and Girton College, Cambridge
- Known for: Head of the Mary Datchelor School
- Predecessor: Caroline Rigg
- Successor: Rachel N Pearse

Dame Madeline Dorothy Brock DBE (18 November 1886 – 31 December 1969) was an English educationist. She served as Headmistress of the Mary Datchelor Girls' School, Camberwell, London from 1918 to 1950. She oversaw the evacuation of the school during the Second World War.

== Life ==
Brock was born in Islington in 1886. She was the youngest of three children. While she was a young child her family moved to Bromley where she attended Bromley High School. She went on to read classics at Girton College, Cambridge where her talent at piano was exploited. She began teaching at the King Edward VI High School for Girls in Birmingham.

Dr. Brock was appointed to be the head of the Mary Datchelor school in 1918 even though she was the youngest candidate. She took over from the founding head, Caroline Rigg.

In 1919, Brock was appointed a member of the Prime Minister's Committee on Classics and from 1927 to 1929, she was chairman of the Committee of the Association of Headmistresses. She became vice-president of the Classical Association in 1930, and a member of the Lancet Commission on Nursing the following year. From 1931 to 1940, Dame Dorothy was a member of the Consultative Committee of the Board of Education. From 1933 to 1935, she was President of the Association of Headmistresses. During World War II, Brock led the evacuation of Mary Datchelor Girls School to Ashford then latterly to Llanelli. She published a pamphlet called "An Unusual Happening" telling the story of the evacuation years. She was a much-loved and caring headmistress. She was succeeded as head in 1950 by Rachel N Pearse. From 1951 to 1968, Brock was a director of the University of London Press.

== Awards and honours ==
Brock was recognised for her services to education with an OBE in 1929, and was named a Dame Commander of the Order of the British Empire in the New Year Honours, 1947.
