= Robert Groves (artist) =

British artist

- Born: 1935
- Occupation: Painter

Robert Groves (born 1935), sometimes known as Bob, was a British artist, and a co-founder of the Ikon Gallery in Birmingham, England, whose name he coined, inspired by his interest in icons

He is an Associate of the Royal Birmingham Society of Artists.

His 2007 exhibition and book, First Light, were inspired by the gardens at Packwood House.

His painting Abstract in Blue (1968) is in the permanent collection of the University of Birmingham.

Recalling the creation of the Ikon Gallery, Groves said:

There was a paucity of places for artists to exhibit in Birmingham. We thought there must be scope to do something in the second city. But we wanted to do something with a bit more spice and there was definitely a real need for something a bit more contemporary in Birmingham at the time.

== Publications ==
- Watkins, Jonathan, ed. (2007). First Light. Ikon. ISBN 9781904864295.
