= John Salt =

British artist (1937–2021)

- Born: 2 August 1937; Birmingham, England
- Died: 13 December 2021 (aged 84); Shrewsbury, England
- Education: Birmingham School of Art Slade School of Art Maryland Institute College of Art
- Known for: Painting
- Movement: Photorealism

John Salt (2 August 1937 – 13 December 2021) was an English artist, whose greatly detailed paintings from the late 1960s onwards made him one of the pioneers of the photorealist school.

Although Salt's work developed through several distinct phases, it generally focussed on images of cars, often shown wrecked or abandoned within a suburban or semi-rural American landscape, with the banality and dishevelment of the subject matter contrasting with the immaculate and meticulous nature of the work's execution.

== Biography ==
=== Early years and education ===
Salt was born and brought up in the Sheldon district of Birmingham. His father was a motor repair garage owner, whose stepfather in turn had been a signwriter painting stripes on the bodies of cars. As a young boy Salt was encouraged to draw and paint, and at the age of fifteen he gained admittance to the Birmingham School of Art, where he studied from 1952 to 1958. From 1958 until 1960 he studied at the Slade School of Art in London, where he was particularly influenced by the work of the English artist Prunella Clough and American Pop Art figures such as Robert Rauschenberg.

Salt returned to the Midlands to teach at Stourbridge College of Art and in 1964 was the first artist to exhibit at Birmingham's newly opened Ikon Gallery, where he had his first one-man show in 1965. In 1966 he married and decided to move to the United States, applying to numerous American art colleges for work before eventually being accepted by Maryland Institute College of Art in Baltimore, where he was offered a place in 1967 on a Master of Fine Arts programme with associated teaching work.

=== Baltimore and the move to photo-realism ===
Sportwagon (1969), oil on canvas.

Salt's work at this time showed influences of both abstract expressionism and Pop Art – the two pre-eminent artistic movements of the time. Unhappy at the prospect of merely selecting which of a pre-existing set of styles he was to adopt, however, Salt sought a more distinct artistic identity and was encouraged to explore a wide variety of styles and techniques by Grace Hartigan, who was the head of the graduate programme at Baltimore and a major influence on Salt's early career.

It was at this time that Salt discovered the book Contemporary Photographers towards a Social Landscape, featuring the work of photographers Garry Winogrand and Lee Friedlander, in the Baltimore college library. Impressed at how the photographers' documentary style relieved them of the self-conscious need to adopt an artistic technique, Salt photocopied the book with an eye to painting some of its images.

Salt's painting Untitled (1967) was a pivotal work in this respect, being very closely based on Winogrand's photograph New York City (1959); both featuring a closely zoomed image of the inside of a car viewed from the outside. Despite the very high degree of similarity between the compositions, Salt's painting was still clearly an artistic interpretation of the photograph, however. Salt realised that if he was to eliminate all traces of expressionism in his work he had to record the image as faithfully as possible, and his next series of paintings – the first of his mature style – featured a series of paintings of car upholstery reproduced directly from a Buick catalogue.

Alex Katz, reviewing Salt's work as an external assessor for the college, skipped over Salt's expressionist work before remarking about the Buick works "Oh this is better. This may not even be art."

=== New York City ===
Salt had originally planned to return to England at the end of his Baltimore course in 1969, but when two of his Buick works were bought by an influential New York City art dealer he took Hartigan's advice and moved there instead.

Salt's work in New York moved away from the earlier smooth consumerist portrayals of car interiors as he started to base his paintings on his own photographs. Initially these featured exterior shots of more worn vehicles, but after his discovery of a scrapyard under Brooklyn Bridge, his work began to feature images of cars mangled and wrecked to the point of violence.

New York City also saw Salt develop a relationship with the art dealer Ivan Karp, who was on the point of opening his own gallery and was to develop a portfolio of artists associated with the emerging photorealist movement. Salt had his first one-man exhibition in New York in 1969 and in 1972 featured in the documenta 5 exhibition in Kassel, Germany where the photorealist school first gained an international profile, since when he has exhibited widely worldwide.

Salt's technique and style developed throughout the early seventies. Under the influence of John Clem Clarke he increasingly used an airbrush instead of a spray gun, with stencils to obtain the detail and precision he sought. His subject matter also broadened to include pick-up trucks and mobile homes, with the use of his own photography encouraging a deliberately informal snapshot-like composition.

=== Return to England ===
Salt returned to England in 1978 and settled in Bucknell, Shropshire. His work in England has largely continued to feature American scenes, however. Salt explained: "I think in a way it [America] has that removed quality I quite like, and also the light is much sharper, you get incredibly clear light, much harder, it's much softer in Britain, it doesn't quite have that edge – edge in every way, in light and subject matter." On another occasion he commented "I've tried desperately to paint British subject matter. It's all so tidy."

During the 1980s Salt moved away from using acrylic paints to using water-based casein, largely for health-based reasons rather than as a question of style. His work also continued to broaden in scope, with an increasing emphasis on the landscape and context of his subject matter, to the extent that in some later works such as Catskill Cadillac the subject is "not so much sinking into the landscape as being hidden by it".

Salt continued to live and paint in Shropshire until his death on 13 December 2021, at the age of 84.

== Work ==
White Chevy – Red Trailer (1975), Airbrushed acrylic on canvas.

Salt's pictures generally feature wrecked cars and decrepit mobile homes in semi-rural locations in the United States. They are produced from photographs by projecting transparencies onto canvas and using an airbrush and stencils to reproduce the colour – a painstaking process that can take up to two years to complete.

The result is that Salt's pictures have an extreme level of detail and precision that lends them a heightened sense of reality and eliminates as far as possible the self-expression of the artist.

Salt's work has been accused of voyeurism in its impersonal and unforgivingly objective portrayals of impoverished lifestyles, something he has gone some way to acknowledge:

I don't like taking photographs because it puts you in situations where it can be confrontational or it can be awkward. My ideal would be a Sleeping Beauty situation where for one day everybody goes to sleep and I could just wander around taking photographs. That would be ideal.

John Salt's legacy lives on in a pub named in his honour, John Salt, in the Islington/Angel borough of London.
