= Jean Rudduck =

British educationist (1937–2007)

- Born: 11 February 1937; Catford, England
- Died: 28 March 2007 (aged 70); Grantchester, England

Jean Rudduck (11 February 1937 – 28 March 2007) was a British educationist known for her enthusiasm for involving student's opinions in education. She researched at East Anglia, Sheffield and Cambridge universities. In 2002 she became Cambridge University's first woman professor of education.

== Life ==
Rudduck was born in Catford in 1937. Her father, Frank George Rudduck, was a chemist and her mother, Dorothy Maud, became a legal secretary. In June 1944 her father, who was then an RAF flying officer, died on a mission over the Netherlands. She was educated in Camberwell at Mary Datchelor girls' school. In 1958 she was one of London University's top graduates when she gained her first class degree in English Literature at, and graduated from Westfield college in 1958. She started her work as an English and drama teacher at Godolphin and Latymer Girls' school in Hammersmith after qualifying as a teacher at King's College.

In 1970 she was one of the four founder members of the Centre for Applied Research in Education (CARE) at the University of East Anglia. Another of the centre's founder members was Lawrence Stenhouse and they became partners. Stenhouse died in 1982 and she moved to Sheffield University.

She met and married John Gray in Sheffield and in 1994 they moved to Cambridge. She was to direct research at Homerton College and she was asked to lead the British Educational Research Association.

In 2002 she became Cambridge University's first woman professor of education.

In 2004 she and Julia Flutter published "Consulting Pupils: What's in it for Schools? ".

Rudduck died in Grantchester in 2007 a month after sending off the final version of "Improving Learning through Consulting Pupils" which she had written with Donald McIntyre.
