= Prestat =

British chocolate retailer and manufacturer

Coordinates: 51.5082°N 0.1374°W

Prestat Ltd

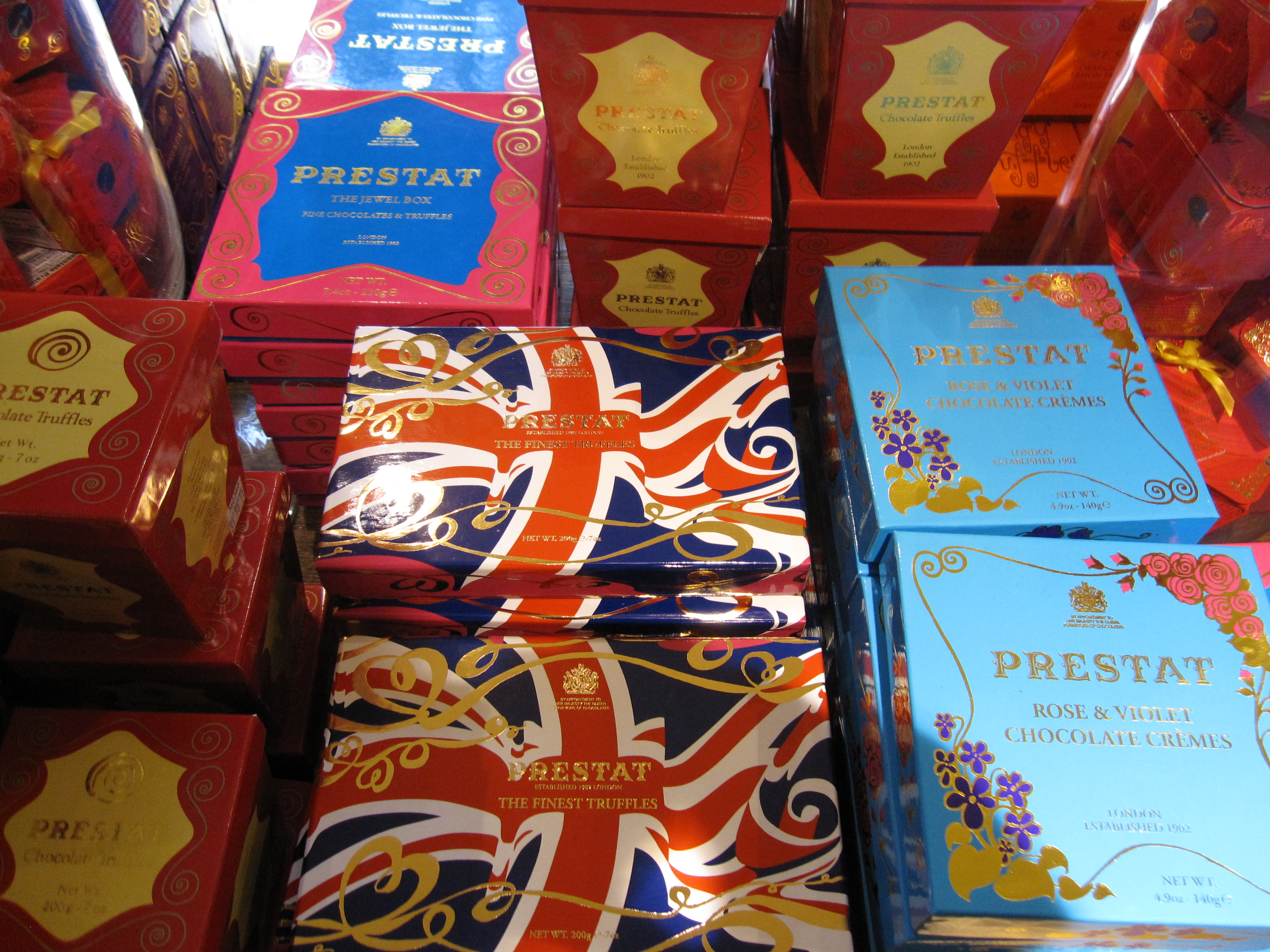
- Products by Prestat (2011)
- Type: Private
- Industry: Retail
- Founded: 1902
- Founder: Antoine Dufour
- Headquarters: Piccadilly, London, England
- Products: Chocolates, Truffles, Assortments
- Owner: Domori S.r.l
- Number of employees: 100 (2019)
- Website: www.prestat.co.uk

Prestat Ltd is one of London's oldest chocolate shops. It has been awarded three Royal Warrants: from Queen Elizabeth II, Queen Elizabeth the Queen Mother and King Charles III.

== History ==
Prestat Ltd was established in 1902 by French émigré Antoine Dufour. The Dufour family created the chocolate truffle in Chambéry in France in December 1895 but it only became widely available when the new creation was brought to England by Antoine Dufour with the opening of the first Prestat shop in South Molton Street in central London.

Antoine Dufour, for reasons uncertain, named his business Prestat after Pierre Prestat who was his wife's first cousin and some of the earlier packaging has the company's name as P. Prestat. Antoine Dufour opened a further two shops, one at 405 Oxford Street and a second at 28 St Swithin's Lane in the City of London financial district.

Antoine Dufour passed the business on to his son Tony Dufour who ran Prestat through to the late 1950s. The difficulties of trading during the Second World War led to the closure of the Oxford Street and St Swithin's Lane stores and Tony Dufour eventually sold the business to brothers Neville and Maxwell Croft.

The company received royal warrants as purveyors of chocolates to Queen Elizabeth II in 1975 and to Queen Elizabeth the Queen Mother in 1999.

Nominated as one of the world's top three chocolate shops by The Economist in 2003 Prestat's current flagship store is at 14 Princes Arcade, Piccadilly, and in March 2009 Prestat opened within the Chocolate Hall of Harrods. Its current range of packaging is the work of designer and artist Kitty Arden, who in 2000 collaborated with Lulu Guinness, the handbag designer, to create a limited edition handbag in the design of the Prestat shop.

The company products are now sold in leading stores (including Harrods, Selfridges, Liberty & Co. and John Lewis Partnership) and fine food shops throughout the UK. Prestat exports its chocolates to countries including Japan, Australia, Singapore, Dubai, Switzerland, Germany and the Netherlands.

== Notable customers ==
Prestat has had a long history of celebrity customers from the actress Sarah Bernhardt in the 1910s through to Sir John Gielgud and Dame Peggy Ashcroft in the 1950s, Diana, Princess of Wales in the 1990s and Stephen Fry, Adrian Lester, and Peter Mandelson today.

Roald Dahl, author of Charlie and The Chocolate Factory, made Prestat truffles central to his racy novel My Uncle Oswald. In this novel, a scheming temptress seduces numerous geniuses and royalty of the 20th century with a love-potion inserted into Prestat truffles.
