= Fecko =

Nigerian hip hop artist and emcee (born 1989)

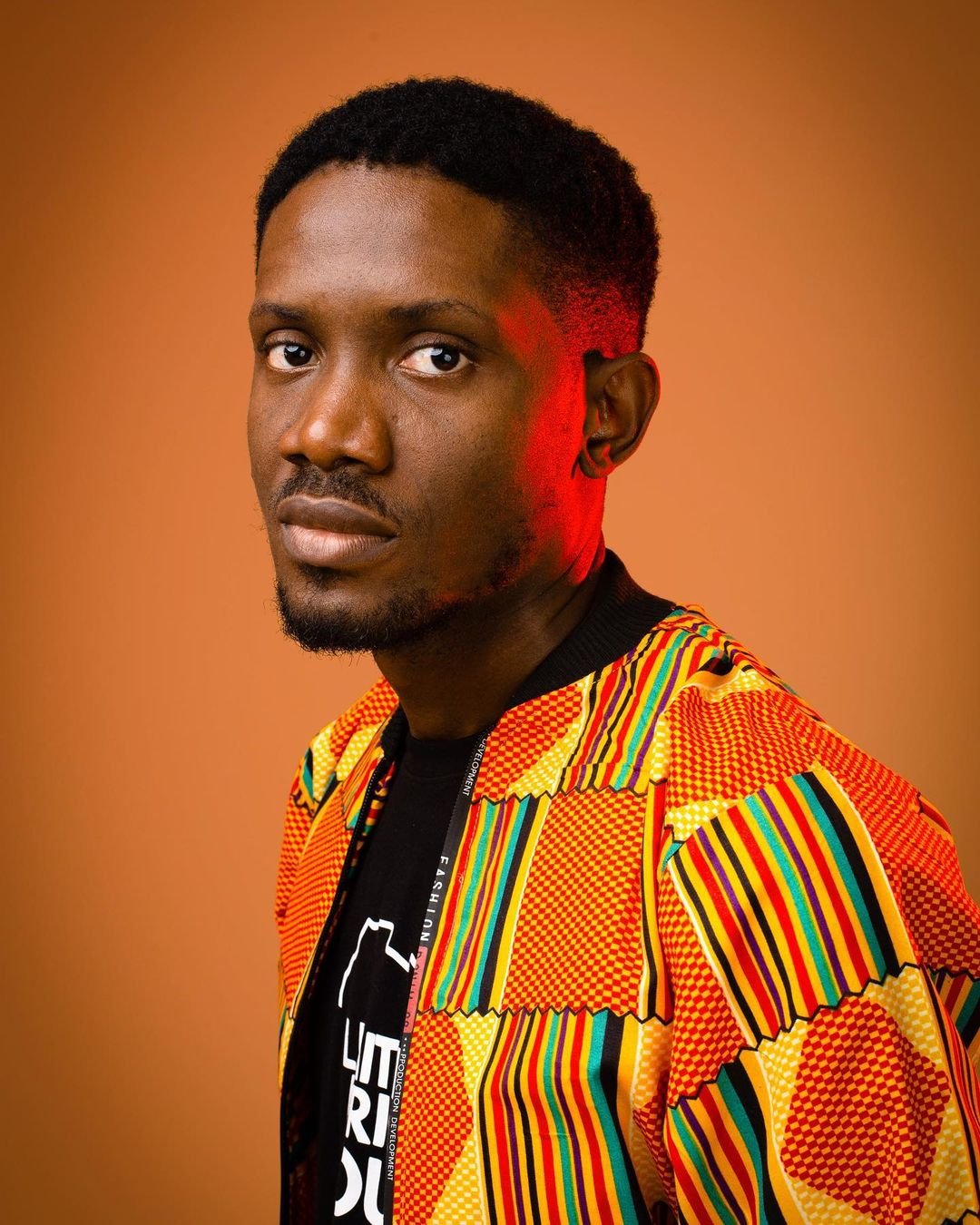

Background information
- Also known as: Fecko the Emcee
- Born: Ifeanyi Chukwuebuka Ibegbunam; Anambra, Nigeria
- Education: Birmingham City University
- Genres: Hip Hop, Afrobeats
- Occupation: Musician
- Years active: 2006-present

Ifeanyi Chukwuebuka Ibegbunam known professionally as Fecko (formerly Fecko the Emcee), is a Nigerian hip hop artist. He is the winner of The Mic Africa Season 1 and the first Nigerian rapper to perform in the metaverse. The stage name "Fecko" is an acronym for the phrase "Formidable Emcees Can Knockout Obstacles".

On 13 September 2023, South African magazine, The Hype magazine profiled Fecko as one of the 5 African rappers you should know in the continent of Africa.

== Early life and education ==
Born in Anambra, Nigeria and grew up in the suburbs of Lagos, Mushin. Fecko is a graduate of Environmental Biology from Yaba College of Education and an alumnus of Birmingham City University in the United Kingdom where he obtained an MA in Design management.

== Career ==
Fecko started his musical career professionally in 2006 when he recorded his debut album which was not officially released on streaming platforms. He has worked with M.I Abaga, The Lady Of Rage, Doug E Fresh, Mode 9, and Khaligraph Jones. His Extended play, "Afrobeat, Rhythm and Truth" was soundtracked on Afrocity show, a limited web series by Ndani TV. Fecko is the host of Surviving Eko, a podcast that elucidate about Lagos through the lens of Lagosians living in the city and in the diaspora.

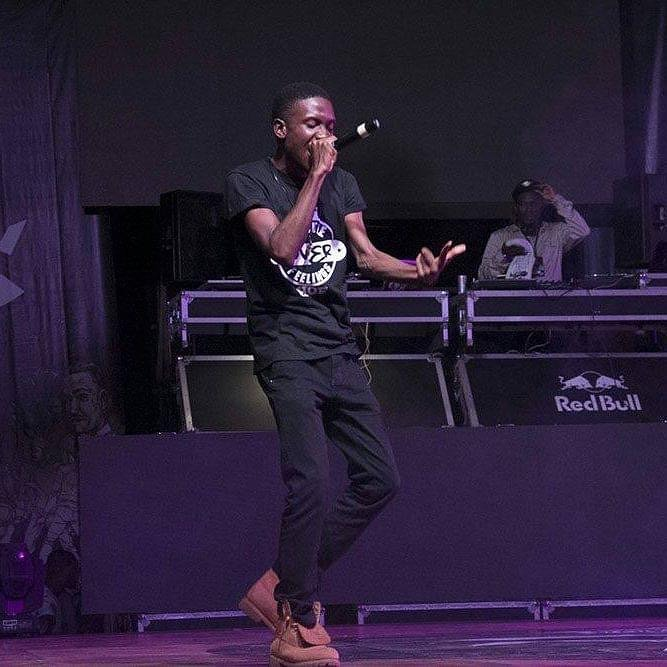
Fecko performing at Battle of the Year 2015

== Critical reception ==
OkayAfrica called "Flow Global" by Fecko a Fela Kuti inspired production.

== Discography ==
=== Albums ===
- Afrobeat, Rhythm & Truth (2016)

=== Singles ===
Title	Year	Album
"Nollywood" (with Terry Tha Rapman)	2009	Non-album singles
"The Future" (with Boogey, Peter Clarke and Pryse)	2012	Non-album singles
"Raplogic"	2012	Non-album singles
"Kalabash"	2012	Non-album singles
"Real African Poetry" (with Khaligraph Jones, Dominant One, The Holstar and Raiza Biza)	2013	Non-album singles
"Hustle Over Feelings"	2014	Non-album singles
"Ladugbomi" (with Tupengo)	2015	Afrobeat, Rhythm & Truth
"Fela Must Rise" (produced by Teck-Zilla)	2015	Afrobeat, Rhythm & Truth
"I No Want Fake" (with Mode 9, Maka and Villy)	2016	Non-album singles
"Jofunmi"	2017	Non-album singles
"Ifeanyichukwu"	2018	Non-album singles
"Finally"	2019	Non-album singles
"Moment Of Victory"	2021	Non-album singles
"Work Chop" (with Villy and Yung Pabi)	2022	Non-album singles

=== As featured artist ===
Title	Year	Album
"Trappin" (Fimzy featuring Fecko, Blaqbonez)	2019	Non-album singles
"Bipolar" (Neky featuring Fecko)	2022	Nghota
"Come My Way" (DJ Equaliza featuring Fecko)	2022	Non-album singles
"Do Me Wrong" (RXTHERAPPER featuring Fecko)		Non-album singles
