= Southlands College, Roehampton =

Coordinates: 51.4595°N 0.2438°W

Southlands College
- University of Roehampton
- Location: Roehampton, London, England
- Motto: Light Love Life
- Established: 1872; 154 years ago
- Architect: Sheppard Robson
- Principal: Lewis Redfern (Head of College)
- Website: https://www.roehampton.ac.uk/colleges/Southlands-College/

Southlands College, in Roehampton in the London Borough of Wandsworth, is one of four colleges at the University of Roehampton and is the location of the university's Business School and its Department of Media, Culture and Language.

It was established by the Methodist Church in 1872, originally in Battersea, as a teacher training college for women and became coeducational in 1965. An early student was Caroline Rigg who became a leading headteacher.

In 1975, the college became part of the Roehampton Institute of Higher Education, which became Roehampton University in 2004.

The college includes Mount Clare House, a Grade I listed building designed by Sir Robert Taylor, and a Methodist chapel.

== See also ==
- Armorial of UK universities
- List of universities in the UK
