= Ikon Gallery =

Contemporary Art gallery in Birmingham UK

The Ikon Gallery
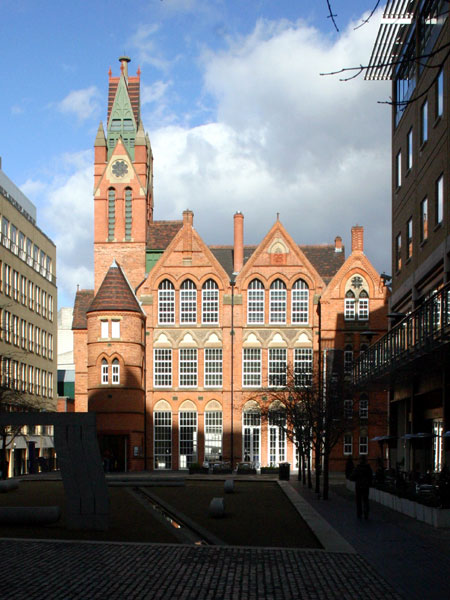
- Established: 1965; 61 years ago
- Location: Brindleyplace, Birmingham
- Coordinates: 52.47°N 1.91°W
- Type: Contemporary art
- Website: ikon-gallery.org

The Ikon Gallery (grid reference SP060866) is an English gallery of contemporary art, located in Brindleyplace, Birmingham. It is housed in the Grade II listed, neo-Gothic former Oozells Street Board School, designed by John Henry Chamberlain in 1877.

Ikon was set up to encourage the public to engage in contemporary art. As a result, the gallery delivers an off-site Education and Interpretation scheme to educate audiences, and to promote artists and their work. The gallery is open every day of the week except Mondays, though it opens on bank holiday Mondays.

Featured artworks include all forms of media including sound, sculpture and photography as well as paintings. Exhibitions rotate throughout the year so that as many pieces can be displayed as possible. Ikon is a registered charity which is partly funded by Birmingham City Council and Arts Council of England.

== History ==
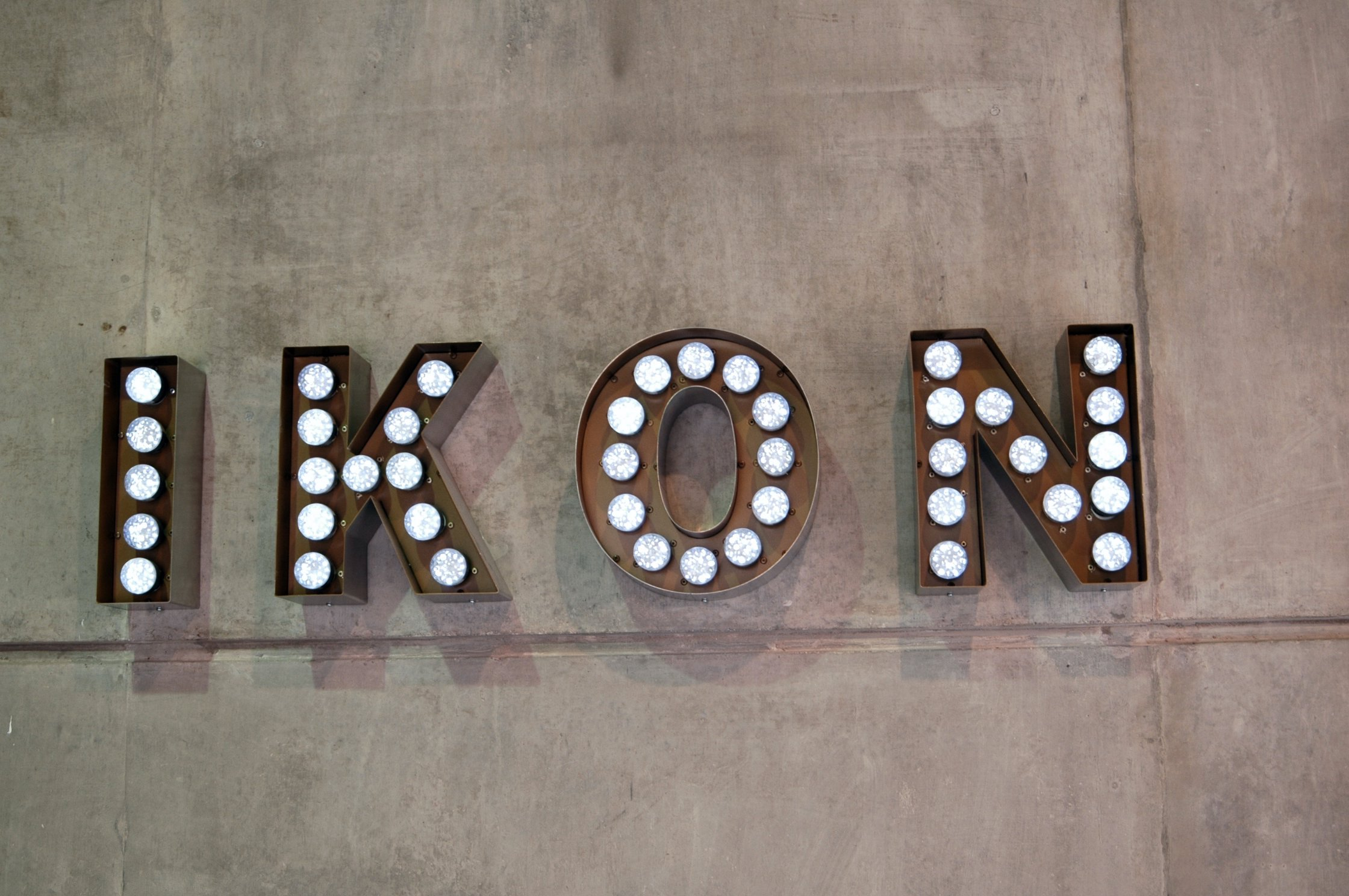
The Ikon Gallery logo just inside the entrance to the gallery

"The Ikon" (as it is colloquially known) was founded by art collector Angus Skene and four artists from the Birmingham School of Art, David Prentice, Sylvani Merilion, Jesse Bruton and Robert Groves. The collection began after Skene bought Prentice's painting Kate and the Waterlilies in 1964, and the two started discussions about the lack of support for contemporary artists provided by Birmingham's existing artistic institutions. The gallery was originally conceived as a "gallery without walls", with exhibitions planned to tour unconventional locations such as cinemas and post offices in a motorcycle sidecar. The gallery was then eventually established in 1965 in an octagonal glass-walled kiosk in Birmingham's then-new Bull Ring shopping centre. The gallery's first exhibition displayed work by John Salt. The venue was then staffed by the founding artists and sometimes their spouses on a voluntary basis.

The gallery's venture was funded by Skene, but organisational control of the gallery was left in the hands of the artists. The name of the gallery was coined by Groves, who was interested in the icons of the Eastern Orthodox Church. The name was agreed by the other founders partly on the basis that it "divides beautifully geometrically and was splendid in all directions". In Ikon's founding prospectus it declares:

"Ikon is intended as an antithesis to exclusive art establishments and galleries … it has been formed because of the need for an accessible place where the exchange of visual ideas can become a familiar reality"

The lease on the kiosk expired after three years, but with Arts Council support the gallery was able to move to the former mortuary in the basement of Queens College in Swallow Street in 1968 and appointed Jeanette Koch as gallery manager.[3] During the next 4 years Ikon held 93 exhibitions and 40 group shows,[6] by which time the lease on the Swallow Street premises came to an end. Under the direction of Simon Chapman (who had previously run the Birmingham Arts Lab) assisted by Jeanette Koch, the gallery embarked on an ambitious expansion of broadening the exhibition programme to include the works of nationally and internationally recognised artists, and to move to a busier location in order to gain greater interest from a wider public. In the autumn of 1972, with increased financial support of The Arts Council together with new funding from West Midlands Arts Association, The Gulbenkian Foundation and a number of local charitable trusts and industry, Ikon re-located in The Birmingham Shopping Centre, a newly built shopping mall above New Street station. The fitting out of the gallery was designed by Walter Thomson of Associated Architects and provided a space four times larger than the Swallow Street gallery and virtually forty times larger than the original Bull Ring kiosk. The number of visitors to the gallery rocketed into the hundreds and on occasions peaked at over a thousand a day providing many with their first opportunity of seeing modern and contemporary art by living artists. The opening show of large chalk on blackboard wall drawings by John Walker firmly established Birmingham as a city with a gallery devoted to the contemporary visual arts.

During the next 6 years, Ikon became positioned as one of the most important contemporary art galleries outside London, attracting both exhibitors and visitors from far beyond the city. Among the artists who had solo exhibitions were Ivor Abrahams, Allen Barker, Barry Burman, John Copnall, Vaughan Grylls, Trevor Halliday, David Hepher, Harry Holland, David Leveritt, John Mitchell, John Salt, Peter Sedgely, David Shepherd, William Tillyer and Roger Westwood. Notable group shows included Midland Art Now featuring the work of 20 of the most prominent Midlands based artists including Roy Abell, Barrie Cook, John Farrington, Dick French, William Gear, Colin Hitchmough, John Melville, David Prentice and Peter Tarrant, and which was accompanied by a full colour printed broadsheet catalogue distributed free to the 40,000 readers of the Birmingham Post. Beyond Destination, a show curated by Ian Iqbal Rashid and featuring contemporary South Asian artists including Sutapa Biswas and Alia Syed went on to tour internationally. Ikon replaced the Birmingham Museum and Art Gallery as the venue for travelling exhibitions of contemporary art such as Diane Arbus curated by John Szarkowski, Chris Orr curated by Nick Serota, Objects and Documents featuring works selected by Richard Smith, An Element of Landscape curated by Jeremy Rees, The Human Clay featuring works selected by R. B. Kitaj, and Berenice Abbott.

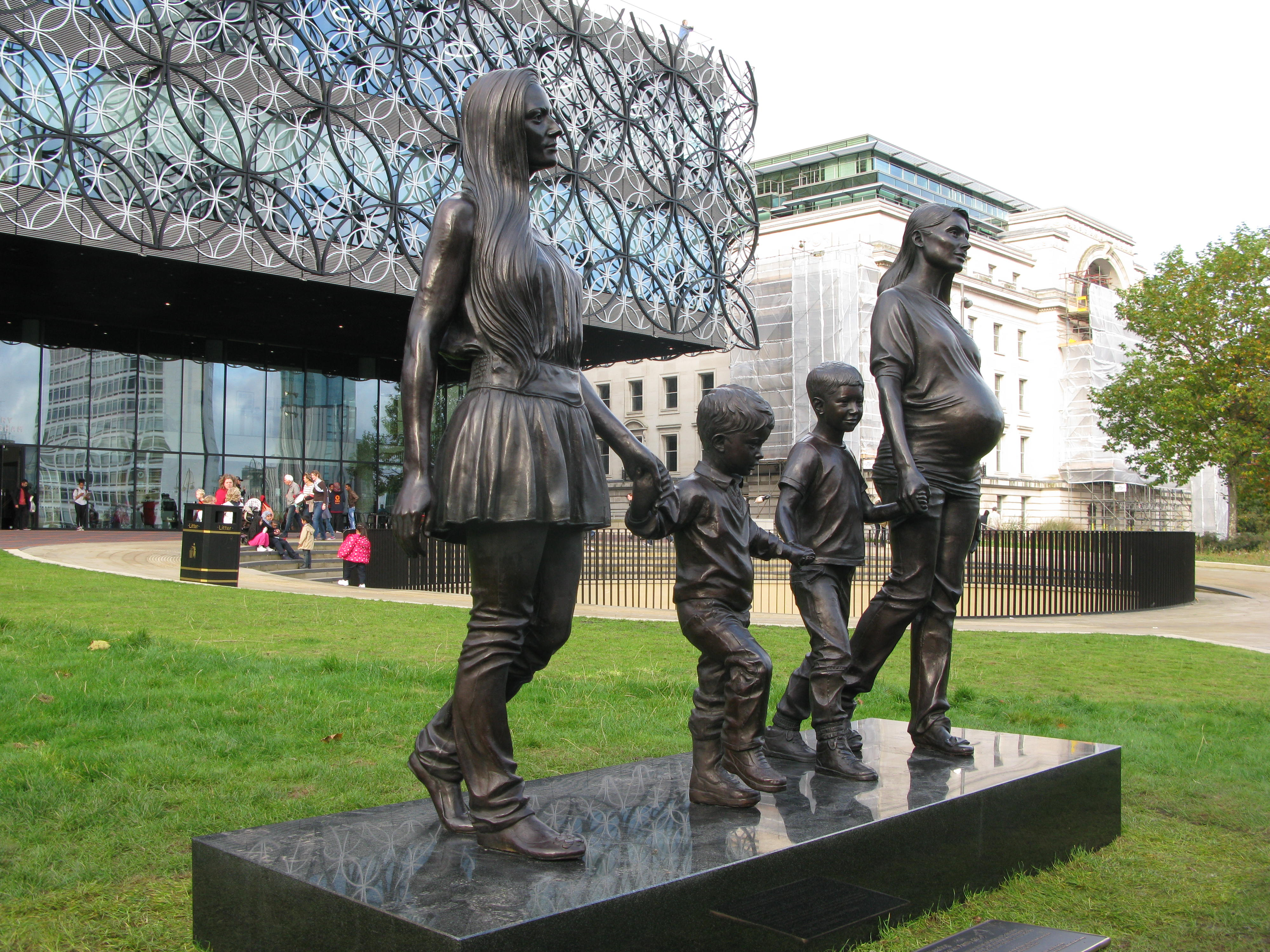
A Real Birmingham Family by Gillian Wearing, with the Library of Birmingham (left) and Baskerville House in the background

By 1978, Ikon had again outgrown its premises and it moved to a former carpet shop in John Bright Street adjacent to the Alexandra Theatre.

The gallery moved to its current site, the former Oozells Street Board School, in 1997 with the cost of the conversion partly funded by a grant from the National Lottery. The refurbishment work was designed by Levitt Bernstein, who reinstated the building's tower, which had been demolished during the 1960s. Café Ikon, on the ground floor, was designed by Birmingham-based architects The Space Studio and opened in December 1998. Form, Space & Order were the contractors.

In 2011, the Ikon Gallery started work with Gillian Wearing, to create a public artwork of 'A Real Birmingham Family'. The consequent bronze cast sculpture was erected in Centenary Square, outside the Library of Birmingham, on 30 October 2014.

=== Ikon Eastside ===
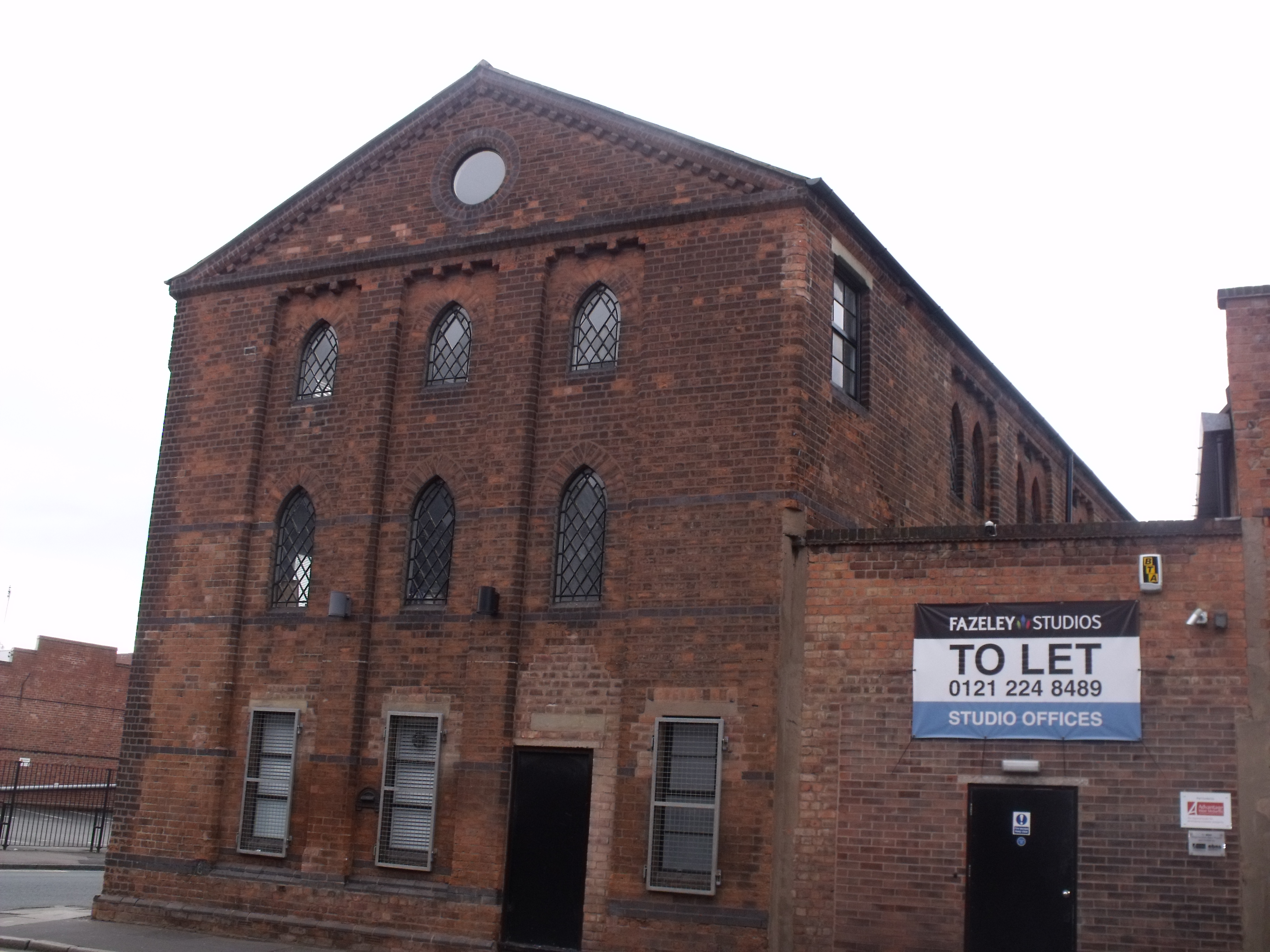
Fazeley Studios

In July 2006, Ikon opened a second site in the Digbeth area of Birmingham, known as Ikon Eastside. It was housed in a Victorian former chapel and Sunday school, with the words "Stay away from Lonely Places" prominently displayed on the façade - an artwork by Canadian artist Ron Terada.

This venue closed in summer 2007, but the gallery opened a gallery in a different building a short distance away in May 2008. After being part of the Fazeley Studios complex it closed permanently in 2011.

== Current activities ==
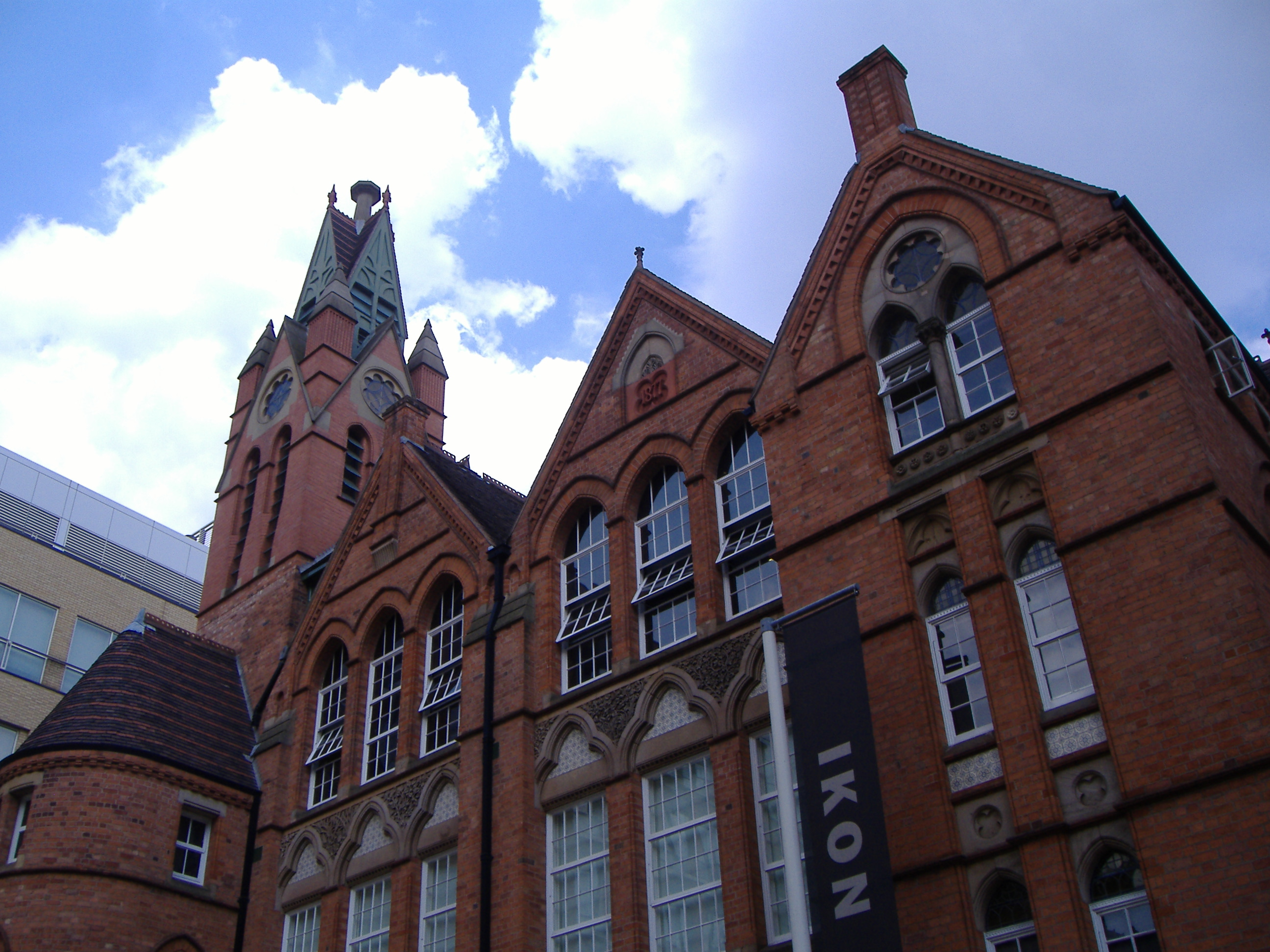
The Ikon Gallery from the entrance.

The Ikon has an artistic programme consisting of three interdependent strands.

- The gallery features temporary exhibitions over two floors totalling 450 square metres (4,844 sq ft). A variety of media are represented, including sound, film, mixed media, photography, painting, sculpture and installation.
- There is also an off-site programme which helps develop dynamic relationships between art, artists and the audience outside the gallery. The projects and events vary enormously in scale, duration and type of location, challenging expectations of where art can be seen and by whom.
- Education is at the heart of the Ikon's activities, stimulating public interest in and understanding of contemporary visual art. Through a variety of talks, tours, workshops and seminars, the Education & Interpretation programme recognises that artistic expression can empower people, heightening individual and community experience.

Ikon is a limited company, registered as an educational charity. Ikon receives core funding from Arts Council West Midlands and Birmingham City Council and raises additional income from a variety of sources, including charitable trusts and foundations and corporate sponsorship.

== Staff ==
In March 2024 the board of trustees made the acting posts permanent: Ian Hyde is Chief Executive Officer, Melanie Pocock Artistic Director (Exhibitions) and Dr Linzi Stauvers Artistic Director (Education). Martin Green was appointed Chair of the Board of Trustees in June 2025.

== Former directors ==
- Simon Chapman (1972–1978)
- Hugh Stoddart (1978–1981)
- Antonia Payne (1981–1989)
- Elizabeth Macgregor (1989–1999)
- Jonathan Watkins (1999–2022)

== Exhibiting artists ==
Solo exhibitions since 2000 include Santiago Sierra, On Kawara, Roy Arden, Marcel Dzama, Olafur Eliasson, Simon Patterson, Richard Billingham, Julian Opie, Cornelia Parker, and Haroon Mirza (November 2018 – February 2019)
