= Jonathan Watkins =

English art historian (born 1957)

- Born: 1957 (age 68–69)
- Education: University of Sydney
- Occupation: Curator
- Relatives: Philip Watkins (brother)

Jonathan Watkins (born 1957) is an English curator, and the former Director of the Ikon Gallery in Birmingham, United Kingdom.

Watkins emigrated to Australia with his family in 1969 and studied Philosophy and History of Art at the University of Sydney. He is the older brother of Philip Watkins, renowned artist and musician. He was curator at the Chisenhale Gallery in London in the early 1990s. Watkins later worked at the Serpentine Gallery from 1985 to 1997 as the institution's curator, and worked in a curatorial freelance capacity for the Biennale of Sydney in 1998.

In 1999, Watkins was appointed to his previous role as Director of the Ikon Gallery, and had also curated projects at the Castello di Rivoli in Turin, the Venice Biennale in Italy, the Hayward Gallery in London and Tate in London.
