= Trevor Denning =

English painter (1923–2009)

Large Mouth (1966), oil on canvas

Trevor J. Denning RBSA (6 December 1923 – 23 October 2009) was an English artist, sculptor, writer, and art teacher who was influential in the Birmingham art community.

== Biography ==
Denning was born in Moseley, Birmingham, studying painting and graphics at the Birmingham School of Art from 1938 to 1942 and teaching there (from 1971 the Faculty of Art of Birmingham Polytechnic) between 1945 and 1985.

In 1947, he was one of the founders of the Birmingham Artists Committee and in 1961 he organised the Four Letter Art exhibition at the Royal Birmingham Society of Artists, having been elected a member the year before. Although there was no organisational link, Denning's work exhibiting contemporary art in the city was acknowledged as an influence by the artists who founded the Ikon Gallery in 1964, and he held a solo exhibition at the gallery two years later.

Denning was also a published expert on Spanish playing cards. He was made the first Member of Honour of the Asociación Española de Coleccionismo e Investigación del Naipe in 1989 and in 1993 won the Modiano Prize for research into the history of playing cards.
