= Camberwell Grove =

Street in Camberwell, United Kingdom

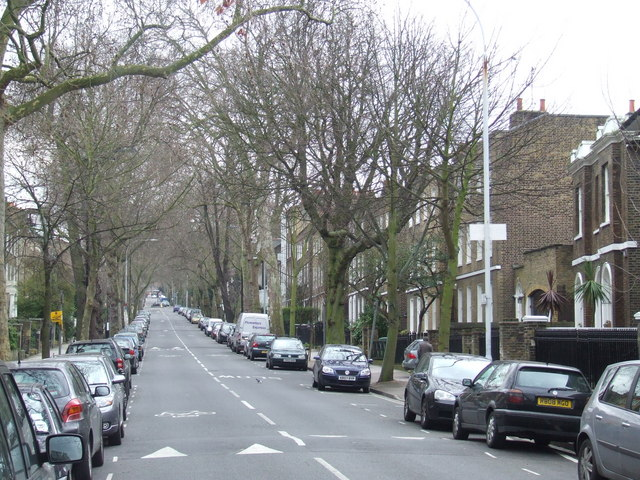
- Camberwell Grove in 2010, looking South
- Maintained by: Southwark London Borough Council
- Location: Camberwell, London, England
- Postal code: SE5
- Coordinates: 51.46923°N 0.08560°W
- North end: Camberwell Church Street
- South end: Grove Hill Road

Construction
- Construction start: mid-1770s

Camberwell Grove (diagonal) on an 1890s Ordnance Survey map.

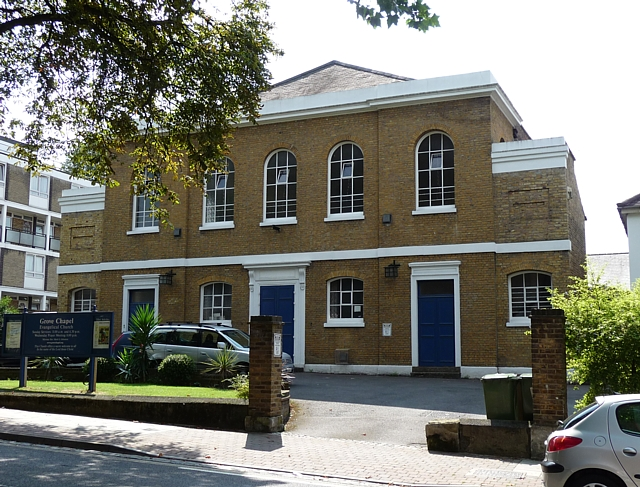
Grove Chapel

Camberwell Grove is a residential street in Camberwell, London, England, in the Borough of Southwark. It follows the line of a grove of trees, hence the name. The street once led from a Tudor manor house south to the top of a hill, which afforded a view of the City of London, approximately three miles to the north. Today, the grove is part of Camberwell Grove Conservation area.

== Creation ==
In the mid-1770s, when Camberwell was still a rural village, the dilapidated manor house was demolished and the surrounding land subdivided and sold. The first four houses, still standing today (numbered 79–85), (Note: Numbers 79-85: 51.47142°N 0.08708°W) were built by speculators at the northern end as a terrace shortly afterwards. They are jointly Grade II listed. Numbers 33–45 also date from this period.

== 19th century ==
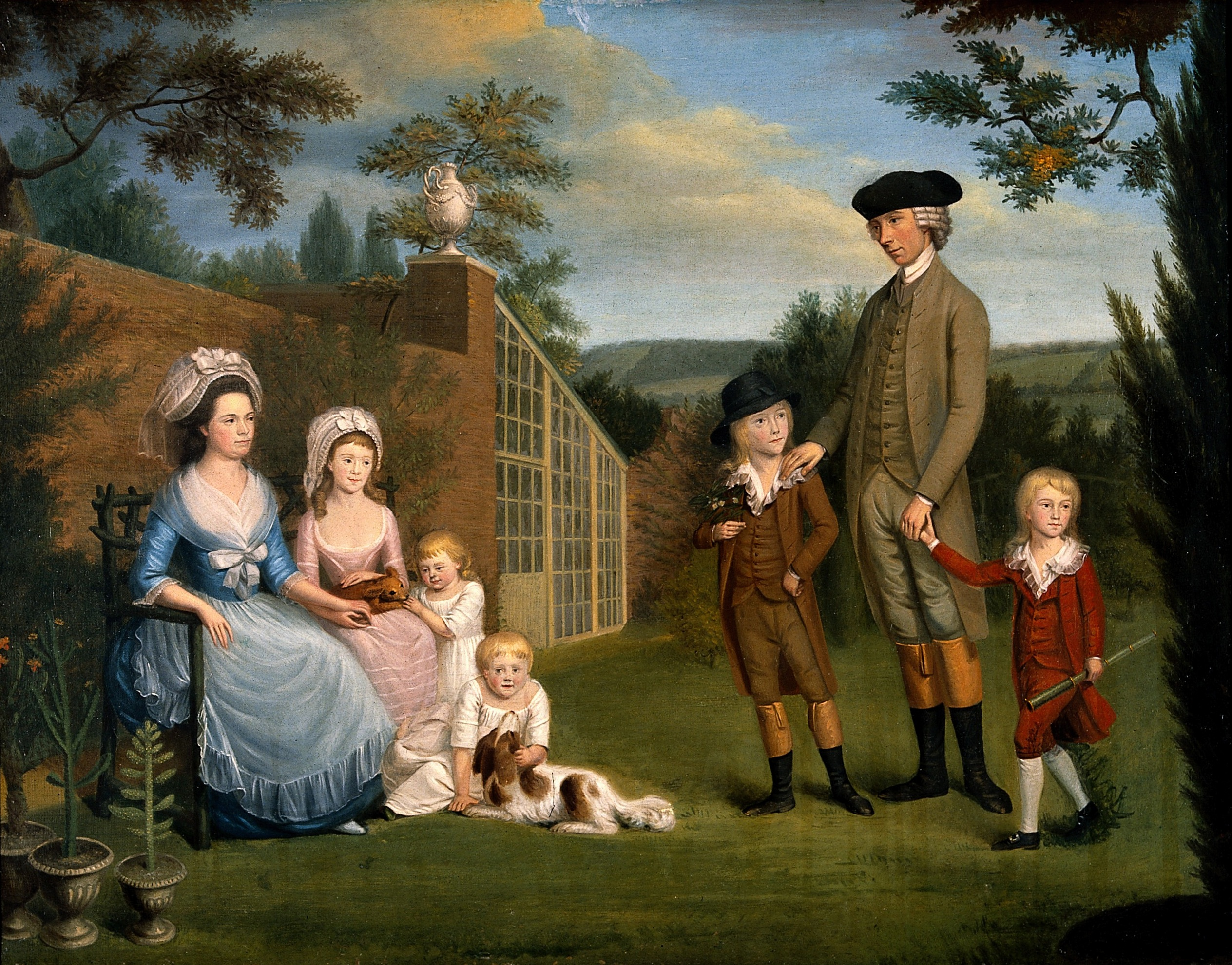
John Coakley Lettsom (1744-1 Nov 1815), physician, with his family in the garden of his house in Grove Hill, Camberwell, Surrey. Oil painting by an unknown English artist, ca.1786. Wellcome Library

John Lettsom, a doctor, had a villa built at the southern end which was demolished when the estate was broken up in the early 1800s, but one of its cottages, 'The Hermitage' (number 220) survives, at the junction with Grove Hill Road. A side-street, Lettsom Street, (Note: Junction with Lettsom Street: 51.47008°N 0.08619°W) Lettsom Gardens, (Note: The Hermitage: 51.46659°N 0.08140°W) a community garden, and a nearby housing estate are named in his honour. The cottage is also Grade II listed. (Note: The Hermitage: 51.46577°N 0.08314°W) A number of other buildings on the street, including Grove Chapel (built 1819, by David R Roper) (Note: Grove Chapel: 51.46945°N 0.08637°W) and the Georgian crescent terrace of eight houses forming Grove Crescent, (Note: Grove Crescent: 51.46822°N 0.08430°W) are also listed.

The South London and East London railway lines, built by the London, Brighton and South Coast Railway in the 1860s and now operated by Southeastern and London Overground, pass below the street (Note: Rail line: 51.46914°N 0.08554°W) (in a tunnel to the west and cutting to the east), just east of Denmark Hill station.

In 2012, the street was the subject of an episode of the BBC series The Secret History of Our Streets, based on the work of Victorian social researcher Charles Booth. Booth assessed the social class of the residents in the street in 1889. The northern end was categorised as middle class "fairly comfortable" and "well-to-do", with parts of the southern end categorised as upper class "wealthy". However, on returning to the street ten years later the social class of residents was recorded as "declining".

== 20th century ==
Some of the houses on the grove were damaged by bombing in World War II, and subsequently demolished. The site is now occupied by the flats numbered 100–138. (Note: Flats, 100–138: 51.46876°N 0.08563°W)

In the 1960s, a proposal to build an elevated motorway across the grove, above the railway, in the style of the Westway, was opposed and eventually overturned by local residents. The artists David Hepher and his wife Janet bought a house on the grove in 1961, and set up studios there. In 1967 the television producer Jeremy Bennett bought a house there.
