= Jesse Bruton =

British painter (1933–2021)

- Born: 1933
- Died: 2021 (aged 87–88)
- Occupation(s): Painter, paintings conservator, restorer

Jesse Arthur Bruton (1933–2021) was a British artist, and a founder of the Ikon Gallery in Birmingham. He gave up painting in 1972, to become a picture conservator.

Bruton was born in 1933, and was educated at Birmingham College of Art, where he later lectured.

He painted landscapes, and later abstract works.

He exhibited at the Royal Birmingham Society of Artists, and held solo exhibitions at Ikon in 1965 and 1967. A retrospective exhibition of his work was held at Ikon from July to September 2016. His painting Winding Road (1967–1968) is in the collection of Birmingham Museums Trust.

Bruton died in 2021.

== Publications ==
- Bruton, Jesse; Watkins, Jonathan (2016). Jesse Bruton. Ikon. ISBN 9781911155034.
