= Neil Hillman =

English sound designer

Neil Hillman MPSE
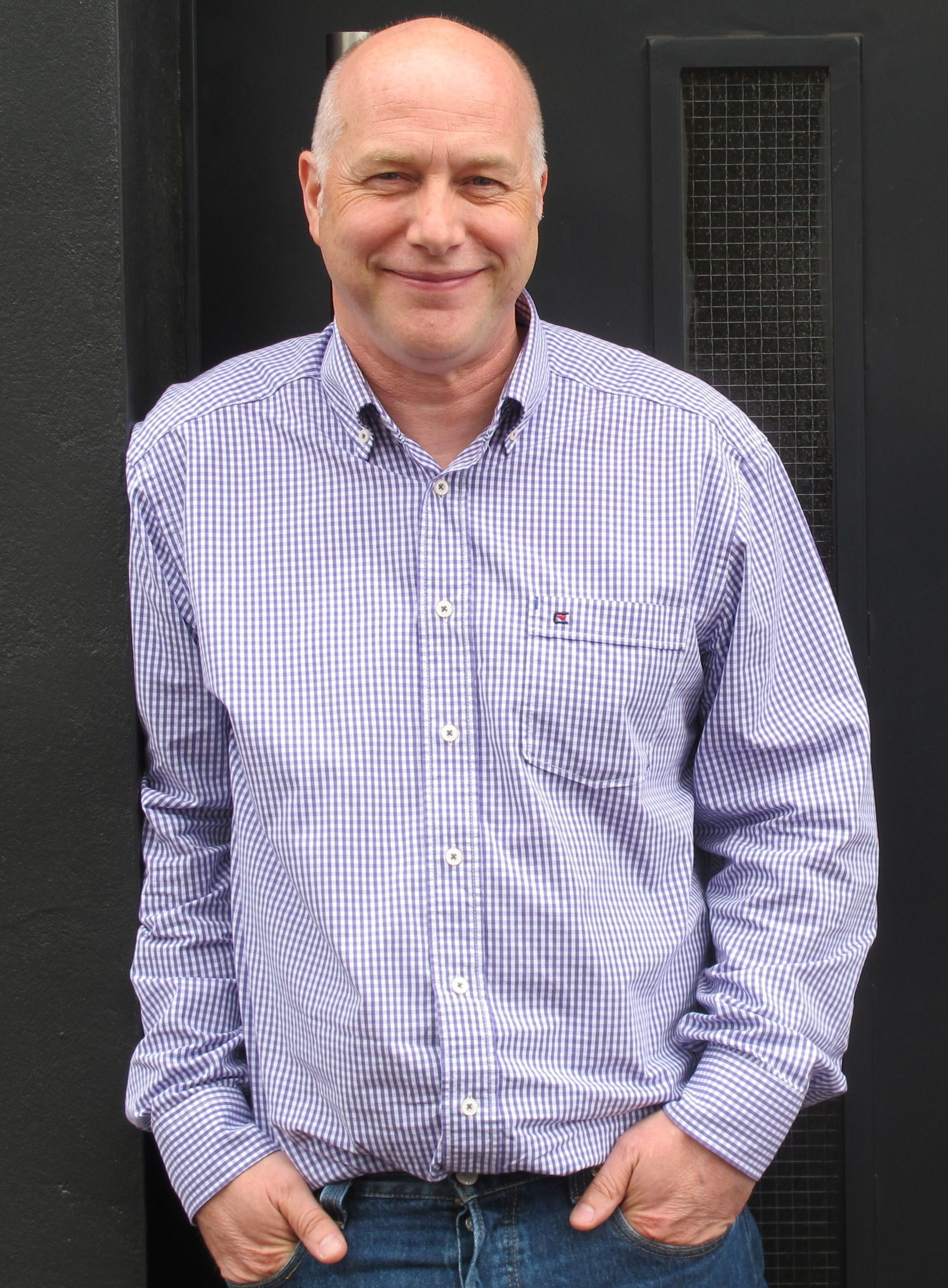
- Hillman outside The Audio Suite, Birmingham, England, April 2012
- Born: Neil Martin George Hillman; 31 January 1960 (age 66); Sutton Coldfield, England
- Education: PhD by Practice, Emotion in Sound Design
- Alma mater: University of York
- Occupation: Sound designer
- Years active: 1982–present

Dr. Neil Hillman MIPS, MPSE, ASSG (born 31 January 1960, Sutton Coldfield, England) is a British-born television and feature film sound designer, re-recording mixer and dialogue editor, notable for his work on the Oscar-winning film Lincoln, New York I Love You and Grace of Monaco. Hillman was awarded the World Medal for Sound Design at the New York Festival for the film The 13th Day in 2010 and in November 2010, he was awarded the Royal Television Society award for Best Production Craft Skills for Sound Design and Mixing on the film Handle With Care.

== Early life, education and sport ==
Hillman was educated at Banners Gate Infants and Junior School, and Riland Bedford High School, in Sutton Coldfield. He was an all-round sportsman who represented his school at rugby, cricket and athletics, and had a long-held ambition to become an apprentice professional footballer through his association as a schoolboy player with Aston Villa. To his lasting dismay, parental intervention rejected the club's subsequent offer, which instead resulted in him leaving school and joining the Birmingham-based American CNC machine tool manufacturer Cincinnati Milacron as an engineering technician apprentice, at the age of 16.

This lost opportunity to play professional football was deeply disappointing for him to accept as a dedicated 16-year old, particularly as several of his schoolboy teammates and associates went on to enjoy careers as senior players at Aston Villa, Birmingham City, Everton, Lincoln City, Manchester City, Scunthorpe United, Stoke City, QPR and Wolverhampton Wanderers, including youth contemporaries such as David Hughes, Bob Hazell and Wayne Clarke.

He subsequently played non-league football for Sutton Coldfield Town, and as a 17-year old was selected for the West Midlands County side in several English inter-county football matches, playing as a representative of the Cincinnati Milacron factory football team, who competed in the notoriously brutal 'Birmingham and District Works' league. Disillusioned by the prospect of a non-league footballing career, and unimpressed by the permanent eye injury he had already acquired from it, he ceased competitive football by the age of 21 whilst playing at North Warwickshire grass-roots club Piccadilly FC. However, he retained a life-long passion for the game and for some years after ceasing playing competitively, he coached juniors as they started out on their own footballing journey.

In 1980, after completing his four-year apprenticeship in mechanical and electrical engineering, he added an extra year to his academic studies; and in 1981 he graduated from the University of Aston with a foundation degree in Industrial Electronics and Instrumentation. He had previously studied Electrical and Mechanical Engineering at Matthew Boulton College and North Birmingham Polytechnic (now Birmingham City University).

In 2017, as a mature student, he completed a PhD by Practice within the University of York’s Department of Theatre, Film and Television (TFTV), researching Emotion in Sound Design under the supervision of Dr. Sandra Pauletto.

== Career ==
1980 - 1990

After completing his apprenticeship and foundation degree in Electrical Engineering, Hillman joined the Midlands-based Central Independent Television in 1982 initially as a sound technician, progressing to senior sound technician working on all aspects of broadcast audio.

1990 - 2000

He left Central TV in 1989 to work as a freelance location Sound Recordist, Dubbing Mixer and Broadcast Sound Supervisor. During this time, he contributed regularly to long-running BBC TV programmes, including five series of The Antiques Roadshow (where he introduced stereo location recording to the programme), travelled extensively overseas to record location sound for the BBC on programmes such as Tomorrow's World, Horizon and Top Gear, and recorded and mixed choral music on location for BBC's Songs of Praise. Overseas filming experience included location sound recording in Belgium, Cyprus, Éire, France, Germany, Holland, Israel, Italy, Japan, Mexico, Spain, Switzerland and frequently the USA.

2000 - 2010

In 1999, Hillman was invited to join Optical Image, a growing UK animation and video post-production company, in a new position as Head of Sound. Hillman set up the post-production sound department for a joint animation venture with Mike Young Productions, Butt Ugly Martians; a 26-part production where Hillman worked alongside Producer Bill Schultz, better known at this time for his role as a producer on US animation hits The Simpsons and King of the Hill. Hillman was the sound designer and re-recording mixer for the entire Butt Ugly Martians series, collaborating with multiple-Emmy winning sound editor, Rick Hinson on episodes 1 and 2.

Between 2000 and 2001, he both location recorded and then audio post-produced a four-part series for Discovery, called Beyond The Horizon, which documented a year in the lives of a group of RAF pilots as they attempted to qualify for the elite Red Arrows display team. The year spent working alongside such excellence, Hillman later said, would irrevocably focus his determination and commitment to achieve similar levels of quality and professionalism in his own work.

Hillman left Optical Image in 2002 to form his own audio post-production company and studios, The Audio Suite. Between 2002 and 2012, The Audio Suite worked as preferred audio suppliers to All3Media, the UK's largest television Production Group, and the Audio Suite also became trusted suppliers to the terrestrial channels of BBC, ITV, Channel 4 and Channel Five and the digital channels BBC Three, BBC Four, ITV4, National Geographic and Discovery. During this time Hillman and The Audio Suite worked on some of the most popular shows on UK television, including Channel Five's The Gadget Show and Fifth Gear, as well as contributing ADR (also known as dubbing) to prestigious TV dramas such as Spooks, Hustle and Survivors for the BBC.

2010 - 2020

Also during this period, Hillman worked as the sound designer and re-recording mixer on feature films including: The 13th Day (for which he was awarded a World Medal for Sound Design at the 2010 New York Film Festival); The Mandrake Root; The Craftsman (a finalist in the 2013 New York Film Festival best soundtrack category); Handle With Care (the film earned two Royal Television Society awards: Best Production Skills for Hillman's soundtrack and Best Short Film); and he contributed ADR services to film productions such as: Steven Spielberg's Lincoln, (re-recording the dialogue of the character Tad Lincoln, played by Gulliver McGrath) for DreamWorks; New York I Love You, (re-recording Oscar-winning actress Julie Christie with director Shekhar Kapur, who took the directorial reins following the untimely death of the original director Anthony Minghella); and Grace of Monaco.

In 2012, and in response to the changing market conditions for audio post-production facility companies, Hillman transitioned The Audio Suite from a substantial commercial work-for-hire post-production facility, with a large city-centre studio complex that included a Dolby mixing theatre with two supporting Dolby mixing studios, to a smaller, bespoke sound design practice with in-house voice recording and mixing rooms, where he worked as a sound designer, dubbing mixer and ADR recordist.

Hillman moved permanently to Australia in 2021, opening a Brisbane-based Audio Suite sister-studio. Initially overseeing both the UK and Australian studio operations, he moved each of the companies sound services online and subsequently closed the Audio Suite in Birmingham in 2023 - more than 20 years after it first opened its doors to audio post-production clients in the city.

== Recent work ==
After transitioning The Audio Suite into a smaller and more agile sound design practice in 2012, two of Hillman's initial projects were the sound design and mixing of Pip Piper's first of three music industry related films, the record store documentary Last Shop Standing - featuring British musicians Paul Weller, Johnny Marr, Norman Cook, Clint Boon, Richard Hawley and Billy Bragg - which went on to earn a maximum five-star review in Q magazine; and the sound design, sound editing and mixing of Lisle Turner's feature film Here And Now, with final mixing taking place at the legendary AIR studios (Associated Independent Recording), London.

He has contributed to a number of notable television shows and features, including Star Wars Rebels for Disney in the US, and Doctor Who, The Only Way Is Essex, Death Comes to Pemberley, Doc Martin and Peaky Blinders in the UK. His feature film work has included production sound mixing (as a location sound recordist) as well as audio post-production, as a supervising sound editor / sound designer, dialogue editor, ADR recordist and re-recording mixer.

In 2015, Hillman was the production sound mixer for the film Scott and Sid, which went on to win several awards, including Best British Film at the National Film Awards, in 2019.

In 2017, he was the dialogue editor and supervising sound editor / sound designer for the British independent film Finding Fatimah, which was edited and pre-mixed at The Audio Suite and mixed for theatrical release at Pinewood Studios.

In 2018, he completed the sound design and mixing work on the second of Pip Piper's related trilogy of documentaries on record stores, vinyl records and independent music venues - The Vinyl Revival.

The final film of Piper's series, Long and Winding Road, premiered at Bush Hall, London on January 21, 2020. It featured Radiohead musician Philip Selway talking with small venue owners and artists including Nick Mason, Adrian Utley, IDLES, Nadine Shah, Gaz Coombes, Novelist, Richard Hawley, Talk Show, Squid and Pip Blom, at venues such as the 100 Club, The Boileroom, the John Peel Centre, the Trades Club, Bush Hall, the Brudenell Social Club, The Cookie, the Moles Club, The New Adelphi Club, The Leadmill, and 229 The Venue.

One of his last production sound mixer engagements in the UK was for director Philip Pugh on the Indie feature film Own Worst Enemy, which resulted in considerable critical success by winning at the Stockholm City Film Festival, Sweden, in 2024; and earned awards at the Sittannavasal International Film Festival, India; the London Indie Film Festival, UK; and the One Location Film Festival, Mexico, in 2025. The film was also selected for screening at the Symbiotic Film Festival, Ukraine, in 2025.

As well as his operational work of recording, sound designing, editing and mixing, Hillman has also consulted with production companies and broadcasters on strategic planning for sports projects with complex workflow and demanding delivery requirements. Clients for this service have included the Olympic Broadcasting Services, UEFA, the ATP Tour and World Aquatics. He worked as a commentary control liaison at the London 2012 Olympics and as an audio mixer at that year's Paralympics; he was the foreign commentary broadcast liaison for the 2013 UEFA Champions League Final; the sound supervisor for boxing at the 2014 Glasgow Commonwealth Games; a commentary control liaison at the Rio 2016 Olympics; an audio mixer on the 2016 ATP World Tennis Tour; and a technical producer during the 2017 Champions League and Europa League tournaments for ITV Sport and BT Sport, as English Premier League clubs played throughout Europe.

He was part of the team installing and operating the Commentary Switching Centre (CSC) within the International Broadcast Centre (IBC) at the 2018 Gold Coast Commonwealth Games; and after the move to Australia in 2021, a Commentary Manager at the '2020ne' Tokyo Olympic games and Paralympic games; and an Audio Mixer at the 2022 Birmingham Commonwealth Games.

He mixed the opening and closing ceremonies of the 2023 Pacific Games in the Solomon Islands for television; he was a Commentary Manager at the 2025 World Aquatic Championships in Singapore; and he Sound Supervised and mixed the Australian Grand Prix round of the 2025 FIM Supercross World Championship on Queensland's Gold Coast.

Hillman has continued to work outside of the post-production studio in Australia, and abroad, as an Audio Director. In 2023, he sound supervised and mixed two series of Love Island USA, in Fiji, for ITV America; and he has been engaged as an audio mixer on diverse, day-to-day Australian sports programming such as boxing, cricket, greyhound racing, netball, rugby union, rugby league and Supercross, for broadcasters such as Channel 7, Fox, ESPN, SEN and Kayo.

In 2025, Hillman teamed up with emerging Australian sound designer Andrew Dean to dialogue edit the movie The Beginning of the End, and later that year, they collaborated in similar roles again on writer and director Simon Croker's film Sugar, which received its world premiere at the Sydney film festival. In early 2026 he collaborated with Australian writer and director Sean Bell on the dialogue editing and sound design of the movie Electric Feel, which in October, served as the closing night film of the 2026 Sydney Science Fiction Film Festival; and in doing so, it received its world premiere whilst winning the festival audience award and best actress award for Naomi Belet.

In 2026, the culmination of 18-months work with director Jack Spring saw the international theatrical release of the UK independent feature film Merry Christmas Aubrey Flint, arriving in UK and US cinemas in time for the Christmas holiday season. Hillman was billed on the cinema posters - and in the film's opening and closing credits - as Director of Sound (and also in the film's credits with the addition of dialogue editor). Director of Sound is an unusual industry title that serves as an extension of the more commonly seen Supervising Sound Editor credit, which was bestowed on him by director Spring, to recognize Hillman's over-arching work on how the movie should sound; collaborating with Spring about the emotional impact of the soundtrack - from the initial idea, the story and the script, and then during the pre-production, production and post-production stages. The film boasts an impressive cast, with John Bradley in the leading role, supported by artists including Richard E. Grant, Celia Imrie, Sophia Di Martino, Nigel Planer, Jim Broadbent, Alex Macqueen and Karl Pilkington. For much of the pre-production, production and post-production Hillman operated remotely from his Australian studio, with Spring visiting twice to enable a more intense development time to be spent together in Brisbane; although Hillman travelled to the UK for several weeks to oversee the pre-mixes at Onsite post production in Soho, and the final theatrical mixing at Bleat post production in East London.

== Writing and publications ==
In 1997, Hillman started writing articles regularly for the industry-leading audio magazine Studio Sound, as well as other industry titles including Audio Media, TVB Europe, Line Up and Stage and Screen, as well as occasionally for mainstream publications such as BBC Top Gear magazine.

In 2001, Hillman was asked to become a member of a small team of writers for a new professional audio magazine called Resolution, assembled by ex-studio sound editor Zenon Schoepe. Hillman went on to contribute regularly to Resolution magazine for over ten years, commencing with its first issue, writing on modern sound production and reviewing equipment.

His first book, Journeyman, was published in October 2013 and is a retrospective view of the most significant decade of digital development (2000 - 2010) in the professional audio-for-picture sector.

He has been featured in several newspapers regarding his outspoken views on the demise of regional television production in the English Midlands, and sound quality for broadcast television; including the Birmingham Post and The Daily Telegraph.

In 2019, he contributed a chapter to Routledge's Foundations in Sound Design and was subsequently invited by the publisher to write a study of his innovative sound design techniques. His book Sound for Moving Pictures: the Four Sound Areas was published in April 2021, and contains a foreword by the legendary American sound designer Walter Murch. In 2024, he contributed a chapter to The Routledge Handbook of Sound Design.

He currently writes, produces and presents the popular podcast The Apple and Biscuit Show with his dialogue editor colleague, Jason Nicholas.

== Research and teaching ==
In 2010, Hillman commenced a part-time PhD by Practice within the University of York (Ebor.) Department of Theatre, Film and Television (TFTV), researching Emotion in Sound Design under the supervision of Dr. Sandra Pauletto. His research involved the Emotion of Sound Design and how sound designers may determine and predict how an audience will react to certain audio stimuli when these are used to support and enhance moving pictures. He graduated his doctorate in 2017.

His PhD research resulted in three academic papers: 'The Craftsman: the use of sound design to elicit emotions' was presented at the University of Ulster's Cinesonika 3 conference in February 2013, and in July 2013 Hillman presented 'Organic and free-range sound design' at the University of York's International Sound Symposium. Both papers have subsequently been published, with 'Organic and free range sound design' published by Edinburgh University Press in edition 4.2 of The New Soundtrack and ‘The Craftsman: the use of sound design to elicit emotions’ published by Intellect in edition 7.1 of The Soundtrack. In March 2016, ‘Audio Imagineering: Utilising the Four Sound Areas Framework for Emotive Sound Design within Contemporary Audio Post-production’ was published by Edinburgh University Press in edition 6.1 of The New Soundtrack.

His work in the emerging field of sound design and its effect on human emotions has been widely cited by other academics, such as:

Pereira, K (2026) Dialogue Editing for Motion Pictures and Television: A Guide to the Invisible Art; Chu, A; García, H.F; Nieto, O; Salamon, J; Pardo, B; Seetharaman, P (2026) Mix2Morph: Learning Sound Morphing from Noisy Mixes; Wei, Z; Li, Y; Lu, W; Gu. Q; Qu, H (2025) At the Peak: Empirical Patterns for Creating Climaxes in Data Videos; Chaurasia, H; Majhi, M (2025) Different User’s Perspectives on Sound Design for Cinematic Virtual Reality (Cine-VR); Forys, B; Qi, E; Todd, R; Kingstone, A (2025) Hear it here: Built environments predict ratings and descriptions of ambiguous sounds; Klein, M. (2024) The Queen’s Gambit and the Three Fantasies of Filmic Media: Image, Narrative, and Sound; Vignesh, G, Vengatesan, R, Mohandas, R, Balasubramanian, S (2024) A Review of Temporally Ordered Routing Algorithm Protocol’s Challenges and Future Directions; Vargas-Aguilar, R.D.C., Banda, I.C.R., Pajuelo, M.L.T., Cotito-Mujica, A., (2024), Listener perspective in games and virtual reality; De Villiers Bosman, I., Jørgensen, K., 'Oz Buruk, O., Hamari, J. (2024), Data Analysis on Cinematic Language in Video Games; Bermêo, G. (2023) Motivo Condutor, Desenho de Som, Re-Sequenciamento Horizontal e Re-Orquestração Vertical: Introdução sobre narrativa em música.; Baldwin, J., Gilmour, A., Loudon, G, H., Gill, S (2023) A Technical Account Behind the Development of a Reproducible Low-Cost Immersive Space to Conduct User Testing; Kettler, A., (2022) Sound Studies - Books of Sonic Interest - 8.2, Chaurasia, H., Majhi, M., (2022), Sound Design for Cinematic Virtual Reality: A State-of-the-Art Review; Butterworth, A. (2022), Beyond sonic realism: a cinematic sound approach in documentary 360° film; Ridley, H., Cunningham, S., Picking, R (2022), Developing an Affective Audio Toolbox for Audio Post-production; Krishna, A., (2021), Virtual Reality Reducing Cognitive Load in Travel Planning; Nożyński, S. (2021), Akuzmatyczność filmowych efektów dźwiękowych. Medialna mistyfikacja foley w kontekście sound designu; Cunningham, S., Ridley, H., Weinel, J., Picking, R. (2021), Supervised machine learning for audio emotion recognition; Hans-Martin Lutz, O., Kröger, J.L., Schneiderbauer, M., Kopankiewicz, J.M., Hauswirth, M., Hermann, T. (2020), That password doesn’t sound right: interactive password strength sonification; Lenzi, S., Terenghi, G., Moreno, A. (2020), A design-driven sonification process for supporting expert users in real-time anomaly detection: Towards applied guidelines Grunewald, S. (2020), Exploration of sound-based music composition tools and techniques for Hollywood-style science fiction films; Chase, Samuel J., (2020), Filminimalism: a multi-framework analysis of postminimalist techniques in contemporary film music. Embodied cognition and misempathetic music in the film scores of Johann Johannsson, Trent Reznor and Atticus Ross, and Mica Levi; Carter, L. (2019), Affective Communities: Music, Emotion, and Subjectivity in the Popular Cinema of the Third Reich and the Soviet Union, 1933-1949; Shi, L., Tomlinson, B. J., Tang, J., Rowan, K., (2019), Accessible Video Calling: Enabling Nonvisual Perception of Visual Conversation Cues; Cunningham, S., Ridley, H., Weinel, J., Picking, R. (2019), Audio emotion recognition using machine learning to support sound design; Heath, T. (2018), Making TV sound: a history of television sound operation from 1970-2010; Marshall, K. (2018), The Gulf War Aesthetic? Certain Tendencies in Image, Sound and the Construction of Space in Green Zone and The Hurt Locker; Chacón, A. M. A. (2018), El sonido en el diseño de marca. Construcción de identidad institucional a través de la radiodifusión universitaria; Donaldson, L.F. (2017), Feeling and Filmmaking: The Design and Affect of Film Sound; Heath, T. (2017), Mumble-gate: Negotiating Theory and Practice in Television’s Production Hierarchy; Kiburi, E.W., (2017), The audio-visual correlation; reconsidering the influence of sound effects in Sci-Fi film;; Delmotte, I. (2017), Losing sight of atmospheric sounds in televised nature documentary and Farnell, A (2014), Sonarchy in the UK: is sound design a rebellious teenager?.

As part of his wider academic work, he is an enthusiastic supporter of new talent and regularly taught undergraduate, postgraduate and Continuing Professional Development theory and practical sessions at the University of York, during the time of his PhD research. He has lectured in Film Production at Staffordshire University and the University of Gloucester; and in Sound for Film and Video at the School of Digital Media Technology at Birmingham City University (BCU), where he was a student mentor and a member of BCU's School of Digital Media Technology Industrial Advisory Board. As an invited international speaker, he has delivered workshops at the SAE Institute Brisbane and Queensland University of Technology. He has also delivered talks for wider audiences in the UK: for the BFI, the Grierson Trust and the BBC Academy.

Hillman has been an external examiner for the sound Masters programme at the Australian Film, Television and Radio School (AFTRS); and in 2023 he became a Ph.D. Co-Supervisor, supervising a Ph.D. candidate researching Virtual Reality (VR) sound design, helping them to develop and adapt Hillman's original 'Four Sound Areas' sound design framework from traditional linear media to Augmented Reality and Virtual Reality applications, at the University of Queensland (UQ) Mixed Reality Lab.

Academic contributions to professional papers and journals whilst at the University of Queensland include:

Elliott, T., Kurucz, P., Hillman, N., (2026) Affective Auditory Design in Depression-Oriented VR: A Controlled Study of Temporal Structure, currently in submission to TOCHI (Transactions on Computer-Human Interaction) the peer-reviewed scientific journal published by the Association for Computing Machinery.

Kurucz, P., Hillman, N., Serafin, S., Klein, E., Baghaei, N. (2026), The Four Sound Areas for Virtual Reality: Connecting Auditory Function, Agency, and Narrative in Human–Computer Interaction, accepted and awaiting publication in the International Journal of Human-Computer Studies.

Kurucz, P., Hillman, N., Serafin, S., Klein, E., Baghaei, N. (2026), The Missing Next Step: Sound, Agency, and Plausibility in Virtual Reality — A Narrative Review, written for the 160th AES Convention held in Copenhagen, Denmark, May 28–30, 2026.

== Awards and recognition ==
In 2008, Hillman sound designed the short film Steamy Windows for UK production company ST16, which won the New York Film Festival Gold Medal and the IVCA Gold Award. That same year, The Audio Suite was nominated for a high-profile Conch award in the TV Facility of the Year category

In 2010, he was recognized by the Royal Television Society when he was bestowed with their 'Best Production Craft Skills' Award for his work on the feature film Handle With Care He also received the New York Festivals Film and Television Festival World Medal for his Sound Design on the feature film The 13th Day in 2010. and was a Finalist in 2013 for his work on The Craftsman. Hillman has contributed to many other award-winning films and programmes.

Neil Hillman is a member of the prestigious Motion Picture Sound Editors (MPSE) society. He was proposed for membership by Rick Hinson, the president of the American Academy of Motion Picture Sound Editors, a friendship from when they worked together on Butt Ugly Martians. He is also a member of the UK Institute of Professional Sound (IPS); in 2023, he was awarded the rare honour of full membership of the Australian Screen Sound Guild (ASSG); he is also a member of the International Society for Research on Emotion (ISRE).

He is a voting member of the British Academy of Film and Television Arts (BAFTA) and he has been a regularly invited member of the New York Festivals Grand Jury, working with other international award-winning directors, producers, writers and sound professionals to judge entries to the festival. In 2022, he introduced and helped judge the award categories 'Best Sound Design' and 'Best Original Score' at the Birmingham Film Festival, his home city.

== Personal life ==
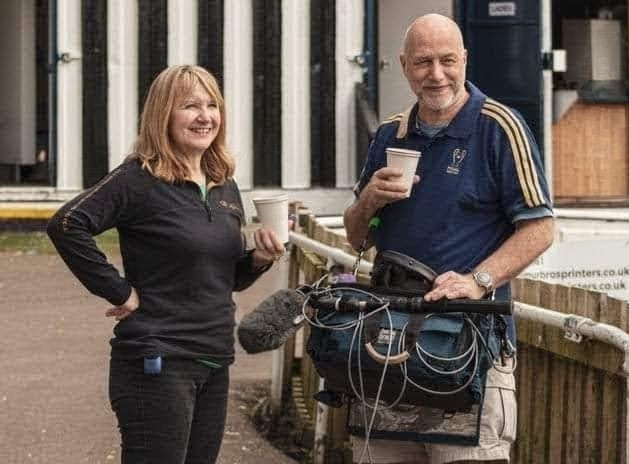
Heather and Neil Hillman working on set together filming in 2020. Heather Hillman - Wardrobe Supervisor, Neil Hillman - Production Sound Mixer.

Hillman operates from The Audio Suite studio in Brisbane, Australia. He is married to Heather, who was the joint managing director of the UK Audio Suite. She has worked on several film productions with her husband: as a wardobe supervisor, and as an occasional voice actress.

He is a keen guitar player and composed, recorded and played the music for StorySmyth Tales - a series of six animated films for young children: Scruff Sheep, Pond Goose, Little by Little, Little Apple Goat, Just Like Tonight and Hurry Up And Slow Down.

He is a committed distance-swimmer, an experienced sailor and an enthusiastic motorcyclist; and has practised Wadō-ryū karate since his early teens. He is a Senpei at Team Blackbelt. In his spare time he works as a volunteer Coast Guard for Marine Rescue Queensland as one of the sea-going rescue boat crew, and also as a Coast Guard base station radio operator.

== Selected work ==
Film

- Scott and Sid (2021) Production Sound Mixer
- Kingsman: The Golden Circle (2017) ADR Mixer
- Pirates of The Caribbean: Dead Men Tell No Tales (2017) ADR Mixer
- Grace of Monaco (2014) ADR Mixer
- Officer Down (2013) ADR Recordist
- Lincoln (2012) ADR Mixer
- New York, I Love You (2008) ADR Mixer
- The Mandrake Root (2008) Sound Designer

Television

- Darby and Joan (2022) Dialogue Editor
- Line of Duty (2021) ADR Mixer
- The Adventures of Paddington (2021) Sound Editor
- Star Wars Rebels (2014) Sound Editor
- The Only Way Is Essex (2014) Sound Editor
- The Gadget Show (2004–2012) Sound Re-recording Mixer
- 5th Gear (2004–2011) Sound Re-recording Mixer
- Butt Ugly Martians (2002) Supervising Sound Editor

Outside Broadcasts

- FIM World Supercross Australian Grand Prix - Gold Coast (2025) - Sound Supervisor
- World Aquatics Championships - Singapore (2025) - Commentary Manager
- Pacific Games Opening & Closing ceremony - Solomon Islands (2023) - Audio Director
- Love Island Games - Fiji(2023) - Audio Director
- Love Island USA - Fiji (2023) - Audio Director
- Birmingham Commonwealth Games (2022) - Sound Supervisor, Games Channel
- Olympic and Paralympic Games, Tokyo 2020ne (2021) - Commentary Manager
- Glasgow Commonwealth Games (2014) - Sound Supervisor
