= Siviter =

Siviter is an English surname of Roman origins. Notable people with the surname include:

- Bethann Siviter (born 1963), British nurse
- Kenneth Siviter (born 1953), British cricketer
