= Birmingham City University =

University in Birmingham, England

- Coat of arms
- Former names: Birmingham College of Art; Birmingham Polytechnic; University of Central England in Birmingham
- Motto: Latin: Age Quod Agis
- Motto in English: "Do what you are doing; attend to your business"
- Type: Public
- Established: 1992—gained university status 1971—City of Birmingham Polytechnic; 1843—Birmingham College of Art
- Affiliations: Association of Commonwealth Universities; University Alliance; Universities UK
- Endowment: £5.3M (2015)
- Chancellor: Ade Adepitan
- Vice-Chancellor: Professor David Mba
- Students: 31,875 HE (2024/25)
- Undergraduates: 24,455 (2024/25)
- Postgraduates: 7,420 (2024/25)
- Other students: 275 FE
- Location: Birmingham, West Midlands, England, UK; 52°28′56″N 1°53′19″W
- Campus: Urban (multiple)
- Website: bcu.ac.uk

Birmingham City University (BCU) is a public university in Birmingham, England. Initially established as the Birmingham College of Art with roots dating back to 1843, it was designated as a polytechnic in 1971 and gained university status in 1992.

The university has two main campuses serving four faculties, and offers courses in art and design, business, the built environment, computing, education, engineering, English, healthcare, law, the performing arts, social sciences, and technology. A £125 million extension to its campus in the city centre of Birmingham, part of the Eastside development of a new technology and learning quarter, is opening in two stages, with the first phase having opened in 2013.

It is the second largest of five universities in the city, the other four being the University of Birmingham (which is the largest), Aston University, University College Birmingham and Birmingham Newman University. Roughly half of the university's full-time students are from the West Midlands, and a large percentage of these are from ethnic minorities. The university runs access and foundation programmes through an international network of associated universities and further education colleges.

== History ==
=== Birmingham School of Art ===
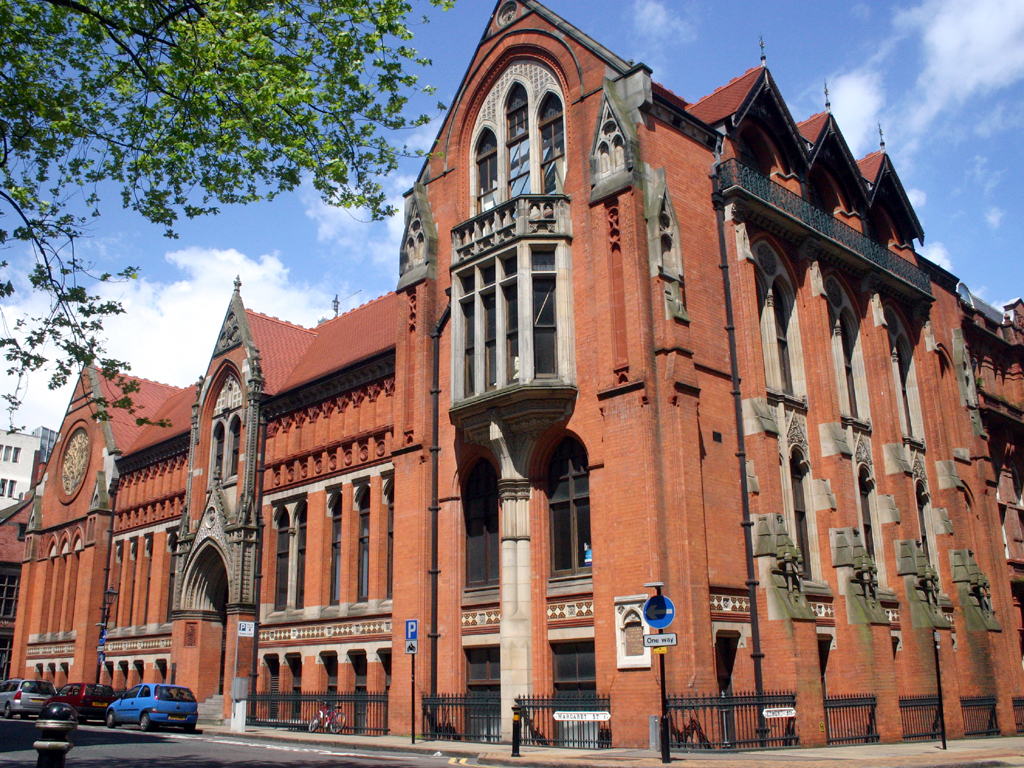
The Fine Art Department on Margaret Street, formerly the Birmingham School of Art

The Birmingham School of Art was originally a municipal art school but was absorbed by Birmingham Polytechnic in 1971 and then became a part of Birmingham Institute of Art and Design (BIAD) in 1988. BIAD was the art and design faculty Its Grade I listed building located on Margaret Street remains the home of the university's Department of Fine Art and is still commonly referred to by its original title. It currently houses the Centre for Fine Art Research (CFAR).

=== Birmingham School of Architecture ===
The Birmingham School of Architecture facility was opened in 1908.

=== Birmingham Polytechnic ===
In the 1960s, changes were made to the higher education system creating an expansion of polytechnics as a more vocationally orientated alternative to the typical university.

The City of Birmingham Education Committee was invited to submit a scheme for the establishment of a polytechnic bringing together a number of different colleges in the city in 1967. Late in 1969, the post of director of the polytechnic was advertised. Although the city lagged behind other parts of the country, Birmingham finally gained a polytechnic in 1971—then the 27th in the UK—designated by the Education Secretary Margaret Thatcher as the City of Birmingham Polytechnic. This was the second polytechnic in Birmingham, the first – Birmingham Polytechnic Institution – having existed in the mid-19th century for ten years.

Early Birmingham Polytechnic prospectuses showing the original logo

It was formed initially out of five colleges. Some of the colleges' staff fought against the merger but later changed their minds. The colleges were:

- Birmingham College of Art and Design (originally the Birmingham Government School of Design, founded in October 1843);
- Birmingham School of Music (developed as a department of the Birmingham and Midland Institute around 1859);
- Birmingham College of Commerce (established in the early 20th century as a branch school of the Birmingham Central Technical College, which went on to become Aston University);
- South Birmingham Technical College (opened in 1961);
- North Birmingham Technical College (formerly Aston Technical College, opened in 1966).

The latter's new Perry Barr campus (which began construction in 1971) became the centre of the new Polytechnic, although the institution continued to have a number of different campuses spread across the city. This has sometimes been seen as a weakness of the polytechnic, with the dispersal of sites considered confusing to visitors.

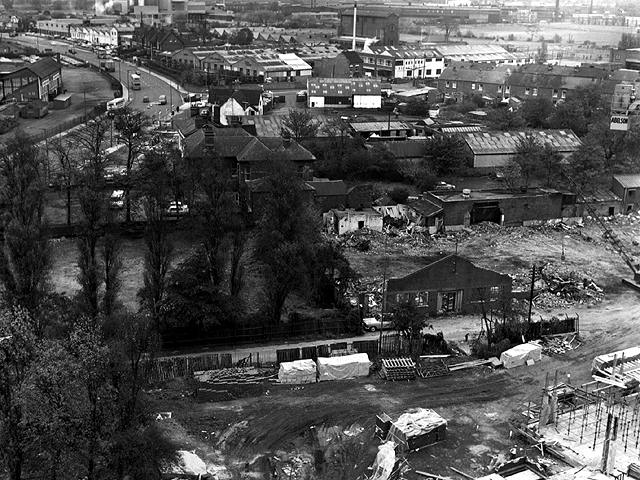
Site of Perry Barr (later City North) campus before building began in the early 1970s

In the early 1970s, the Perry Barr campus was the site of building work for what later became the centrepiece of the polytechnic: the Attwood and Baker buildings. Later in the 1970s, the campus was increased in size with the building of what later became the Cox, Dawson, Edge, Feeney and Galton buildings. In the early 1980s, the William Kenrick Library was added to the site. Other, smaller buildings were subsequently constructed, and the estate became known as the City North Campus of Birmingham City University.

From its opening, the polytechnic was considered very strong in the field of art and design. As early as 1972, fashion and textile courses were heavily oversubscribed; there were 100 applications for every 30 places. Also in that year, the polytechnic held the Design in a Polytechnic exhibition, which was opened at a reception hosted by Sir Duncan Oppenheim, the chairman of the Council of Industrial Design. Arts courses remained strong at the polytechnic through the 1970s, with twice as many arts students compared to those doing engineering or technology courses.

In 1975, three more colleges were added to the polytechnic:

- Anstey College of Physical Education (founded as a private college for women in 1897);
- Bordesley College of Education (founded as a Local Education Authority (LEA) Day Training College for women teachers in 1963);
- City of Birmingham College of Education (founded as an LEA Emergency Teacher training college in 1948).

In the mid-1970s, the polytechnic's then-chairman, William Kenrick, sparked criticism from politicians for saying his students were "second-class" students. In 1978, a lecturer in law, Francis Reynolds, was convicted and fined £150 for preparing instruments of property conveyance without being a solicitor. He did this to challenge the monopoly solicitors held over conveyancing, which he felt led to higher costs.

Logo after the late 1980s

By 1979, the polytechnic was one of the biggest in the country, though that did not prevent it from being "starved" of resources and money. There was a concern that without sufficient investment, the quality of its degree courses in areas such as engineering could not be maintained to the desired standard.

In 1988, the Birmingham Institute of Art and Design (BIAD) was established from the merging of the polytechnic's Faculty of Art and Design with Bournville College of Art. The extensive archives from these earlier incarnations, including over 10,000 artworks, were housed at the polytechnic's Margaret Street campus.

Following the UK Government's Education Reform Act in 1989, the polytechnic ceased to be under Birmingham Local Education Authority control and became an independent corporation with charitable status. It was funded by the Polytechnics and Colleges Funding Council and no longer by the local education authority. The polytechnic continued to have close links to Birmingham City Council, and the Lord Mayor of Birmingham continued to serve as the university's chancellor for many years.

The change in status enabled a tighter union between the polytechnic and industry, and by 1989 it had 30 lecturer's posts sponsored by firms.

=== University status ===
The Further and Higher Education Act 1992 allowed all polytechnics to adopt the title of "university". The name University of Central England in Birmingham was approved by the Privy Council on 16 June 1992. The name change took place in time for the new academic year starting later that year. Students who graduated in mid-1992 were given certificates bearing the name University of Central England, even if the entirety of their study had taken place at the polytechnic. The original design was created by Amba Frog Design after a meeting with delegates from university student councils.

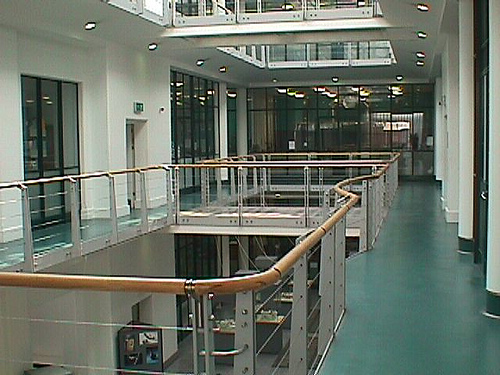
Inside view of Vittoria Street, School of Jewellery, which reopened in 1995

In 1995, two more colleges were absorbed—Birmingham and Solihull College of Nursing and Midwifery, and the West Midlands School of Radiography—and the Birmingham School of Jewellery opened on Vittoria Street in Birmingham's Jewellery Quarter. The Faculty of Engineering and Computer Technology provided the basis for the creation of the Technology Innovation Centre (TIC) in 2000. The following year, the Faculty of Health incorporated the Defence School of Health Care Studies.

In November 2003, the university pursued a merger between UCE and Aston University that, according to The Guardian, "would create an institution of 32,000 students with a £200m turnover". The plans were announced by the then Vice-Chancellor Peter Knight, and approved by lecturers. The new institution would use the established Aston University name, and all UCE staff members' jobs and employment conditions would be kept intact, although Vice-Chancellor Knight would not be part of its management team. He estimated a completion date for the merger of August 2006.

Michael Sterling, vice-chancellor of University of Birmingham, welcomed the initiative and said it was time for some creative thinking about higher education in the city. "Clearly, with three very distinct universities in one city, it's sensible to take a hard look at the big picture and how we can best work together, whether separately, in combination, or even as one institution," he said. His intervention provoked a furious reaction from Peter Knight, vice-chancellor of UCE, who made it clear his approach was only to Aston University.

The Aston University Council discussed the proposal during a meeting on 3 December 2003 and concluded that it should be rejected. Aston University said that "Whilst the Council respects UCE's distinctive mission, it does not share UCE's analysis of the potential opportunities that might arise from any merger", and cited influencing factors such as Aston's approach to research and teaching, the "significant differences between the missions and strategies" of Aston and UCE, and the negative impact that prolonged discussions would have on both institutions. Aston suggested that it, UCE and the University of Birmingham should instead begin discussions about the three universities' contribution to the future of local and regional higher education.

In August 2005, the University of Central England rebranded itself as UCE Birmingham for marketing and promotional purposes, though the original name remained for official use. This decision was reversed in March 2007, following the arrival of a new Vice-Chancellor, and the fuller title University of Central England in Birmingham was resurrected for all purposes.

=== Renaming ===
In June 2007, it was announced that the university would be renamed from 'UCE Birmingham', with three possible names being proposed: Birmingham City University, Birmingham Chamberlain University, and Birmingham Metropolitan University. Staff and students (both current and alumni) were asked to complete a survey on what they wished the name to be changed to. On 1 October 2007, Vice-Chancellor David Tidmarsh unveiled the name change from UCE Birmingham to Birmingham City University. 48.2% of those who voted on the survey voted for this name, although 62.1% of staff had voted for Birmingham Metropolitan University. The University of Birmingham Council had previously advised UCE that their preferred choice was Birmingham Metropolitan University, and that it considered Birmingham Chamberlain University "unacceptable" because of Joseph Chamberlain's historic involvement and association with the University of Birmingham.

The proposed name change was met with mixed reaction from students and student union officials. A common argument was that money should be spend on facilities and building repair work, and some students felt ignored by the establishment. The rationale for the name change was a perceived confusion of the location of the university and to give a "shorter, more powerful name". The rebranding of the university, which included changing signage and stationery, cost £285,084.

The university's current logo, designed by Birmingham-based BHMG Marketing, is based on the tiger in the crest originally used when it was awarded university status. The crest itself originated from the Birmingham College of Commerce, one of the institutions that formed the polytechnic in 1971. In 2009, the logo was revised to include the word "CITY" in upper-case on the first line instead of in lower-case on the second.

=== Moving to the city centre ===
Since 2011, the university has moved more of its operations to the centre of Birmingham, with teaching at the longstanding Perry Barr site gradually wound down. At the City Centre Campus, the Parkside Building for Design and Media students opened in 2013; the Curzon Building, which houses Business, Law and Social Science courses as well as library, IT and student support facilities opened in 2015; and a new music building for the Royal Birmingham Conservatoire opened in 2017. The university also announced plans to revive the former Belmont Works site nearby as STEAMhouse — a place for small and medium-sized businesses to collaborate with students and academics. This building opened in 2022.

Education courses moved to the City South Campus, where health programmes were already based, leaving the university with two main sites in the city, together with a small number of satellite buildings. Demolition of the Perry Barr campus began in 2018 and was completed by summer 2019.

A history of the university (Birmingham City University: A History in 100 Images), written by Professor David Roberts (former Head of English at BCU), was published in November 2025, charting the development of the university from its earliest foundations in 1843 through to its modern-day incarnation.

== Campuses ==
Throughout its history the university has been spread across a number of different sites in Birmingham. As of 2026, the university has the following campuses:

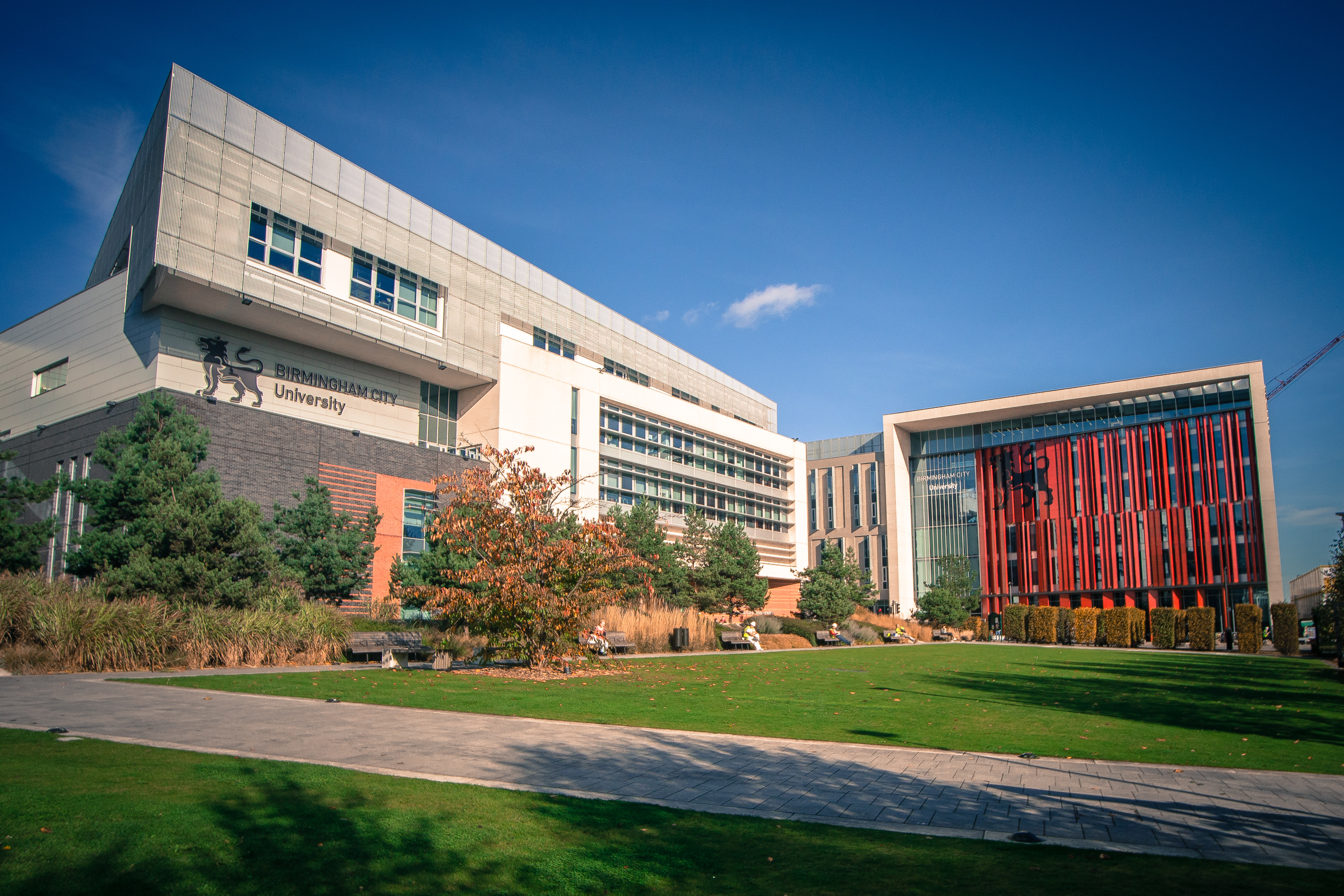
The Parkside and Curzon buildings are part of the City Centre Campus

- City Centre Campus, located is the home of the Faculty of Computing, Engineering and the Built Environment inside Millennium Point. The Parkside Building, adjacent to Millennium Point and connected to it via a bridge, opened its doors in 2013, housing Birmingham School of Media and design courses from the Faculty of Arts, Design and Media. The Curzon Building houses the Faculty of Business, Law and Social Sciences and the School of English, as well as the library, Students' Union and other support services. In 2023, doors opened to STEAMhouse, a £72 million development on the former Belmont Works building - the new home to Computing, Engineering and the Built Environment.
- City South Campus is based in Edgbaston. The main hub is the Mary Seacole Building on Westbourne Road, home to the university's health, education and life sciences courses, and a moderate amount of student accommodation.
- The Royal Birmingham Conservatoire opened in 2017 and is located near New Street and Moor Street train stations
- Vittoria Street in the Birmingham Jewellery Quarter, home to Birmingham School of Jewellery.
- Margaret Street, home of the School of Fine Art, formerly home of the Birmingham School of Art.
- Ruskin Hall, Bournville, home to Birmingham School of Acting.
- Doug Ellis Sports Centre, Perry Barr

The university has completed a "flagship" extension to its campus in Birmingham City Centre, next to the existing facilities at Millennium Point. The City Centre Campus is a £150 million scheme, as part of Birmingham's Eastside development, with design and media students moving into Phase 1 of the development in 2013, from the former Gosta Green Campus and City North Campus, respectively. Business, English, law and social sciences followed when Phase 2 of the new building was completed in 2015. As of September 2017, Birmingham City University invested approximately £220 million into campus infrastructure while moving its campus into the city centre.

=== Facilities ===
The Benjamin Zephaniah building (formerly University House) is located close to the City Centre Campus is home to professional service departments. The International Project Space (IPS) is an art gallery located at the Bournville Centre for Visual Arts.

Moor Lane is a venue for sports, business training and conferences near to City North Campus. The Doug Ellis Sports Centre, named after Doug Ellis, opened on 4 January 2010 and includes a fitness suite, workout classes, and a sports hall. Under a new 10-year agreement, Serco will run both the sports centre and the existing Pavilion sports facility in Perry Barr.

=== Accommodation ===
University Locks is a residential halls of residence located adjacent to the City Centre Campus. The university also offers accommodation in a number of privately owned halls of residence, these include Jennens Court, My Student Village: Birmingham (formerly clv Birmingham) and Curzon Gateway in the city centre and Queens Hospital Close near Five Ways.

== Organisation and governance ==
=== Chancellors ===
After the former Birmingham Polytechnic was granted University status it installed the city's Lord Mayor as its Chancellor each year. It was one of only two national institutions to adopt this link with its local region. On 14 August 2024 the University announced Ade Adepitan as their new chancellor

Name	Duration
Chauhdry Abdul Rashid	2008–2009
Michael Wilkes	2009–2010
Len Gregory	2010–2011
Anita Ward	2011–2012
John Lines	2012–2013
Mike Leddy	2013–2014
Shafique Shah	2014–2015
Ray Hassall	2015–2016
Sir Lenny Henry	2016–2024
Ade Adepitan	2024-present

=== Schools ===
The university has schools and departments covering a wide range of subjects.

- School of Arts
- Royal Birmingham Conservatoire
- Business School
- School of Law and Social Sciences
- School of Architecture, Built Environment, Computing and Engineering
- School of Life and Health Sciences
- School of Nursing and Midwifery

==== School of Arts ====
Previously, the Faculty of Arts, Design and Media (ADM) was created in 2014 by the merger of the Faculty of Performance, Media and English with the Birmingham Institute of Art and Design. This faculty includes the art and design related courses taught by the School of Art, School of Architecture and Design, School of Fashion and Textiles, School of Jewellery and School of Visual Communication.

There are three departments:

- Department of English and Media has undergraduate English programmes specialising across Literature, Language Studies, Drama and Creative Writing; and joint honours programmes in English and Media.
- Department of English and Media
- Department of Fashion and Jewellery

==== Royal Birmingham Conservatoire ====
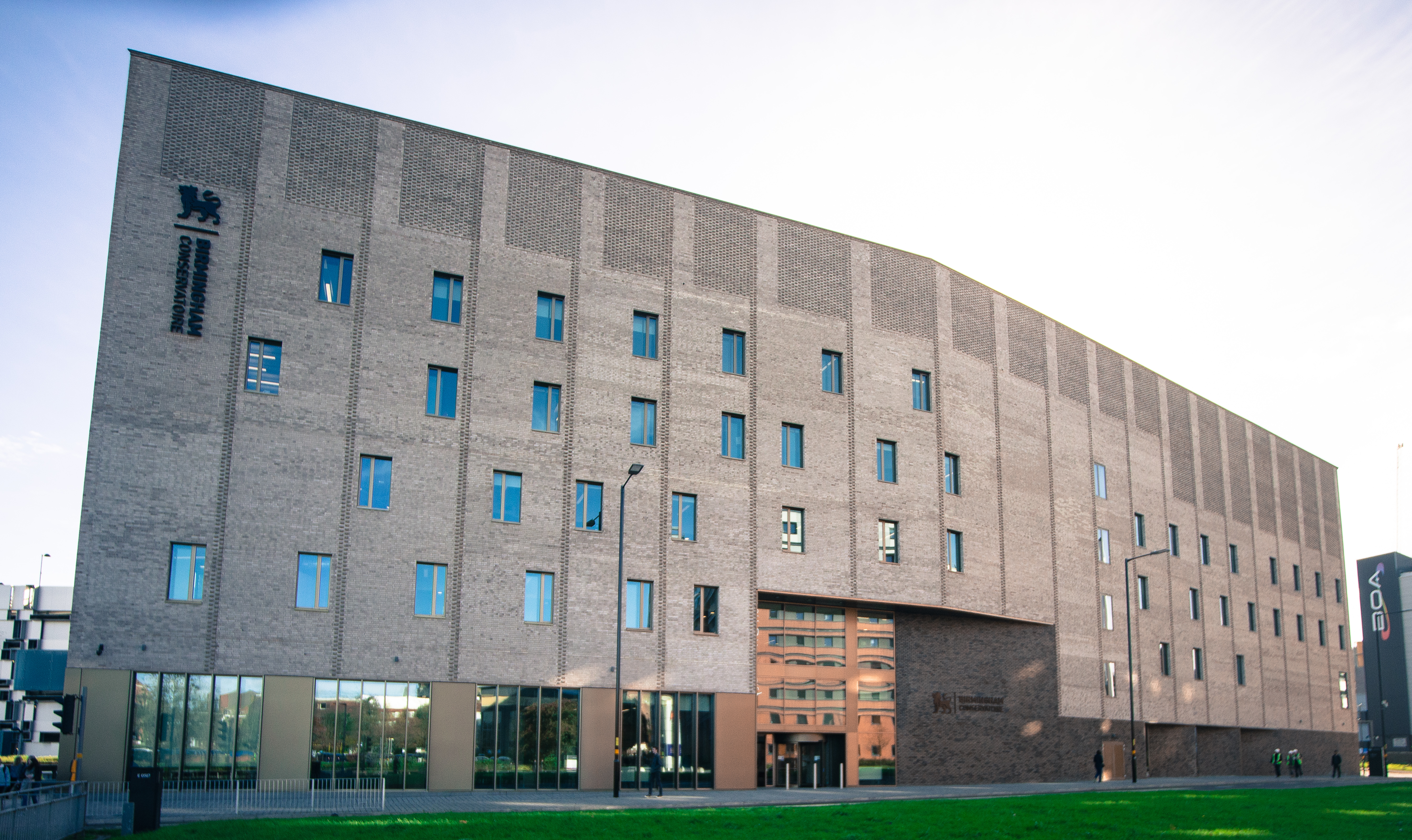
The new building for the Royal Birmingham Conservatoire opened in 2017

The Royal Birmingham Conservatoire is an international conservatoire and junior school and a major concert venue for many of Birmingham's principal concert promoters and organisations, hosting over 300 events annually. Their Junior Department provides tuition to over 200 young musicians aged 3 to 18 in classical music, chamber music, North Indian music and jazz. Birmingham School of Acting was founded in 1936, merged with the university in 2005, and in September 2017 it merged to become part of the Conservatoire.

The school is based in purpose-built facilities within the City Centre campus at Millennium Point which include 11 studios. Alongside its undergraduate programmes in Acting, Stage Management and Applied Theatre, the school offers specialist postgraduate programmes in Professional Voice Practice and an MFA in Acting: The British Tradition.

==== Business School ====
The Birmingham City Business School offers courses in Accounting, Finance and Economics, Business and Management and Marketing. It incorporates two academic departments: the Department of Accountancy, Finance and Economics and the Department of Management, Business and Marketing.

==== School of Nursing and Midwifery ====
The School of Nursing and Midwifery has three departments:

- Department of Adult Nursing
- Department of Mental Health and Learning Disability Nursing
- Department of Midwifery and Children’s Health

In 2002, the Royal Centre for Defence Medicine (RCDM) joined the university to offer Ministry of Defence students and nurses better key skills in nurse training.

==== School of Architecture, Built Environment, Computing and Engineering ====
The School of Architecture based at Millennium Point and later incorporating STEAMhouse as the new home going forward, offers subjects such as computing, engineering, architecture and construction. It was formerly known as the Faculty of Computing, Engineering and the Built Environment. It has three departments:

- Department of Architecture and Built Environment
- Department of Computer Science
- Department of Engineering

=== Libraries and collections ===
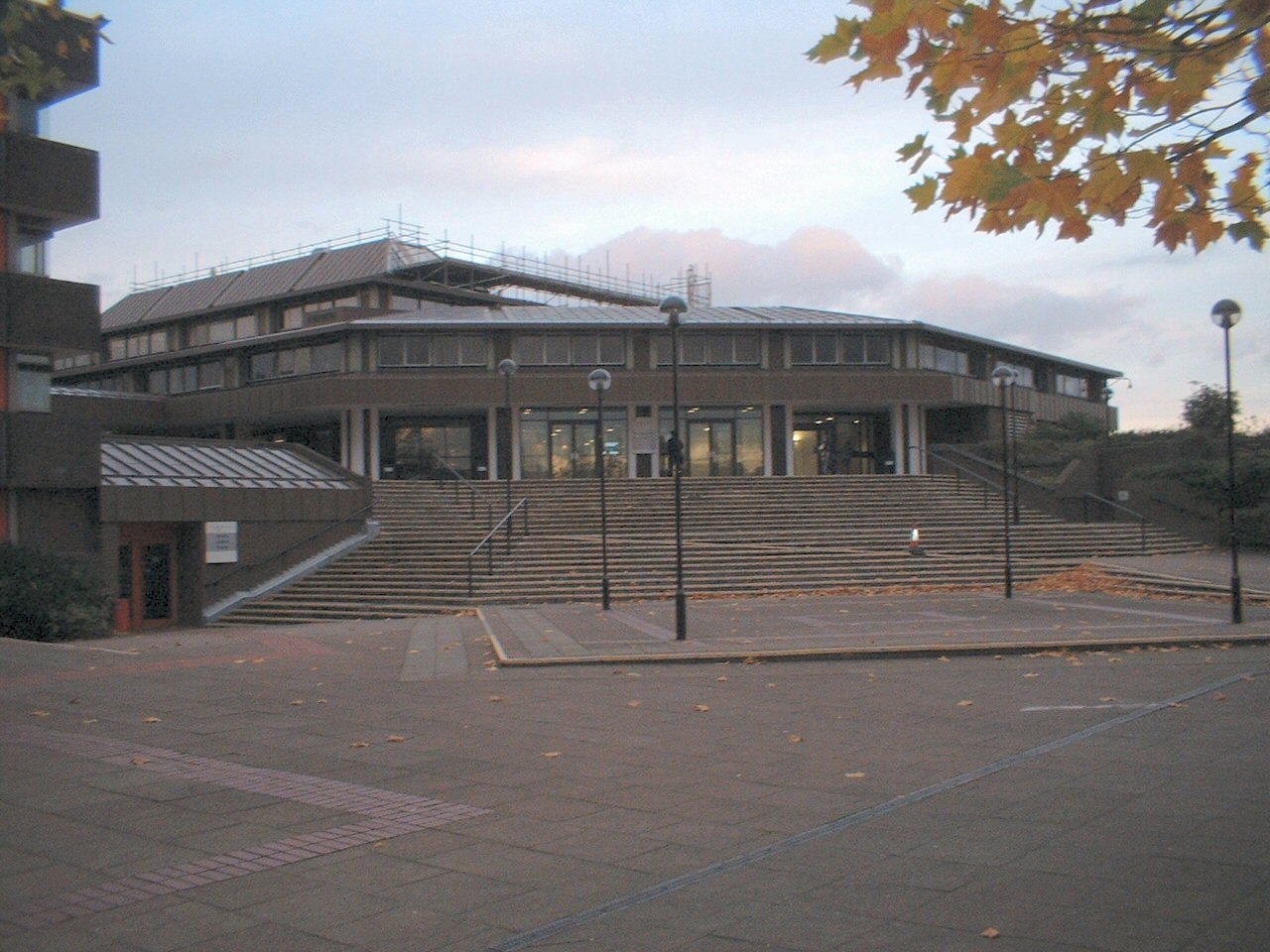
Steps up to front entrance of Kenrick Library, City North Campus (now demolished)

The university has four libraries across Birmingham on all campuses that contain around 950,000 books and 9,000 print and electronic journals:

- Curzon Library (located at the City Centre Campus and houses the Conservatoire library collection);
- Mary Seacole Library (located at the City South Campus);
- Margaret Street Library (School of Art);
- Vittoria Street Library (School of Jewellery).

Kenrick Library, named after William Kenrick in recognition of his role as the first Chairman of Governors when the Polytechnic was formed in 1971, was located at the City North Campus. The library closed in May 2018 when the remaining schools based at Perry Barr moved to the City South Campus.

==== Controversy over Mapplethorpe ====
In 1998, the university was involved in controversy when a book by photographer Robert Mapplethorpe, Mapplethorpe (1992), was confiscated. A final year undergraduate student was writing a paper on Mapplethorpe's work and intended to illustrate the paper with a few photographs. She took the photographs to the local photo-studio to be developed and the photo-studio informed West Midlands Police because of the unusual nature of the images. The police confiscated the library book from the student and informed the university that the book would have to be destroyed. If the university agreed to the destruction, no further action would be taken.

The university Vice-Chancellor, Peter Knight, took the view—supported by the Senate—that the book was a legitimate book for the university library to hold and that the action of the police was a serious infringement of academic freedom. The Vice-Chancellor was interviewed by the police, under caution, with a view to prosecution under the terms of the Obscene Publications Act, which defines obscenity as material that is likely to deprave and corrupt. The police focused on one particular image, 'Jim and Tom, Sausalito 1977', which depicts one man urinating into the mouth of another.

After the interview with the Vice-Chancellor, a file was sent to the Crown Prosecution Service as the Director of Public Prosecutions (DPP) has to take the decision as to whether or not to proceed with a trial. After a delay of about six months, the affair came to an end when the DPP informed Knight that no action would be taken as "there was insufficient evidence to support a successful prosecution on this occasion". The original book was returned, in a slightly tattered state, and restored to the university library.

=== Partner institutions ===
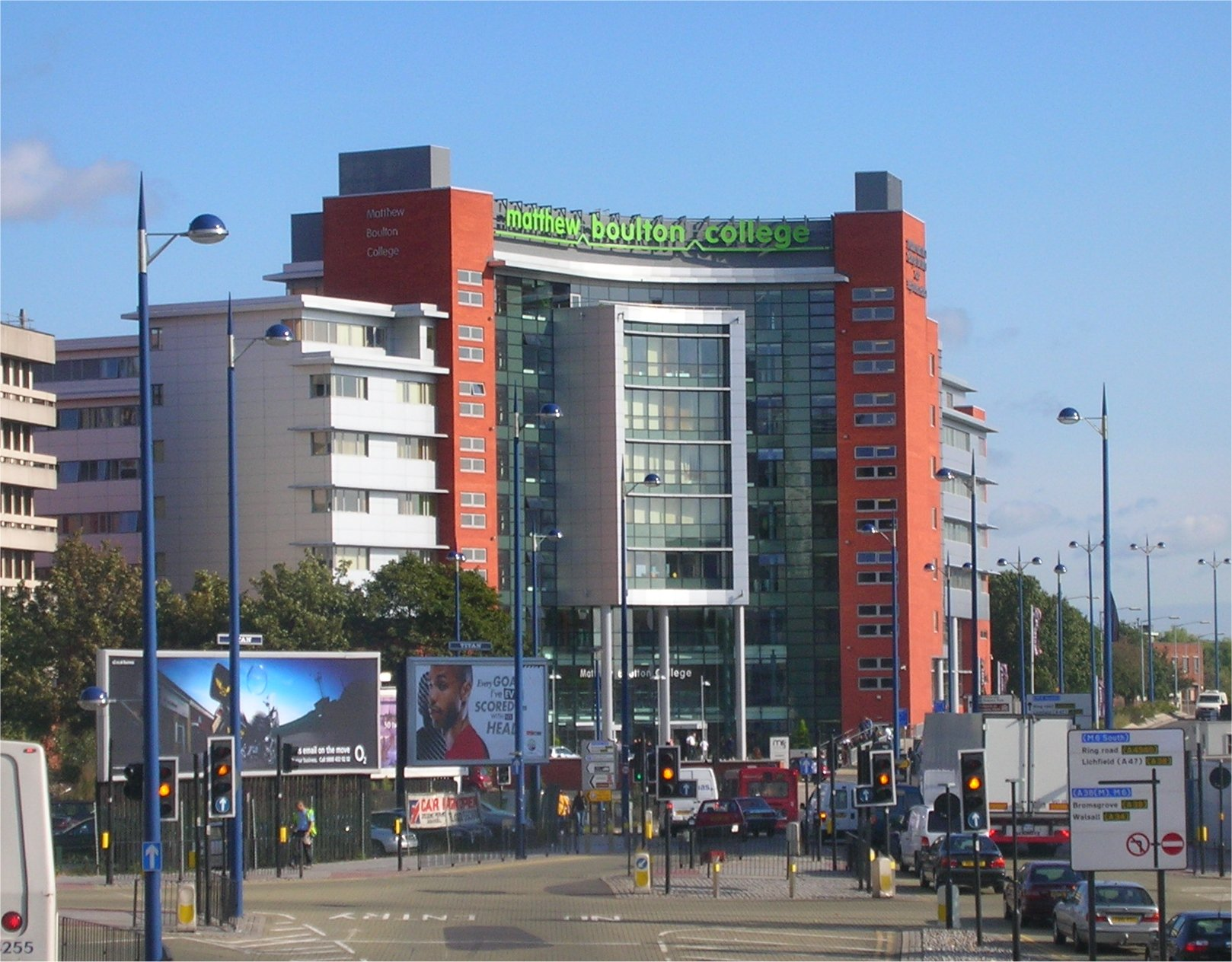
Birmingham Metropolitan College, one of the university's partner institutions

The university runs access and foundation programmes through an international network of associated universities and further education colleges.

== Academic profile ==
=== Research ===
The university has five Centres of Research Excellence, which are the main focus of its research activity. Following the 2008 Research Assessment Exercise conducted by the Higher Education Funding Council for England, the Birmingham Post reported that more than 70 per cent of research work submitted by Birmingham City University—including in business and management studies, education, English, social work and social policy, and town and country planning—was "officially recognised as of an international standard", and 15 per cent of that work was "rated as world leading". Its art and design submission was among the ten highest ranked in the country, and Birmingham Conservatoire was rated one of the top three conservatoires, and the best outside London. The university was ranked sixty-third based on average assessment scores.

=== Rankings and reputation ===
Rankings
National rankings
- Complete (2027): 95
- Guardian (2027): 113
- Times / Sunday Times (2027): 113

Global rankings
- QS (2027): 1001–1200
- THE (2026): 801–1000

The university has a number of courses accredited by Creative Skillset, the government's skills sector council for audio, visual and creative industries. With regard to post-production, the university also has Avid Mentor status, and is the Midlands' accredited training centre for Apple's Final Cut editing software.

For health and social care, Birmingham City University was awarded national recognition as a Centre for Excellence in Teaching and Learning. The university has an on-site virtual operating suite for health students, the first at a university in England. In the Smithers-Robinson League Table, for initial teacher training, Birmingham City University and three other institutions are consistently ranked top ten. Ofsted inspection scores for teacher education courses are frequently among the best.

== Student life ==
Roughly half of the university's full-time students are from the West Midlands, and a large percentage of these are from ethnic minorities. The university runs access and foundation programmes through an international network of associated universities and further education colleges, and it has the highest intake of international students in the Birmingham area. For 2009 entry, applications rose by 37 per cent from 2008, one of the biggest increases at any university. There are almost six applications per place and a typical entry tariff of 112 UCAS points for honours degree programmes; other courses' requirements vary.

=== Students' Union ===
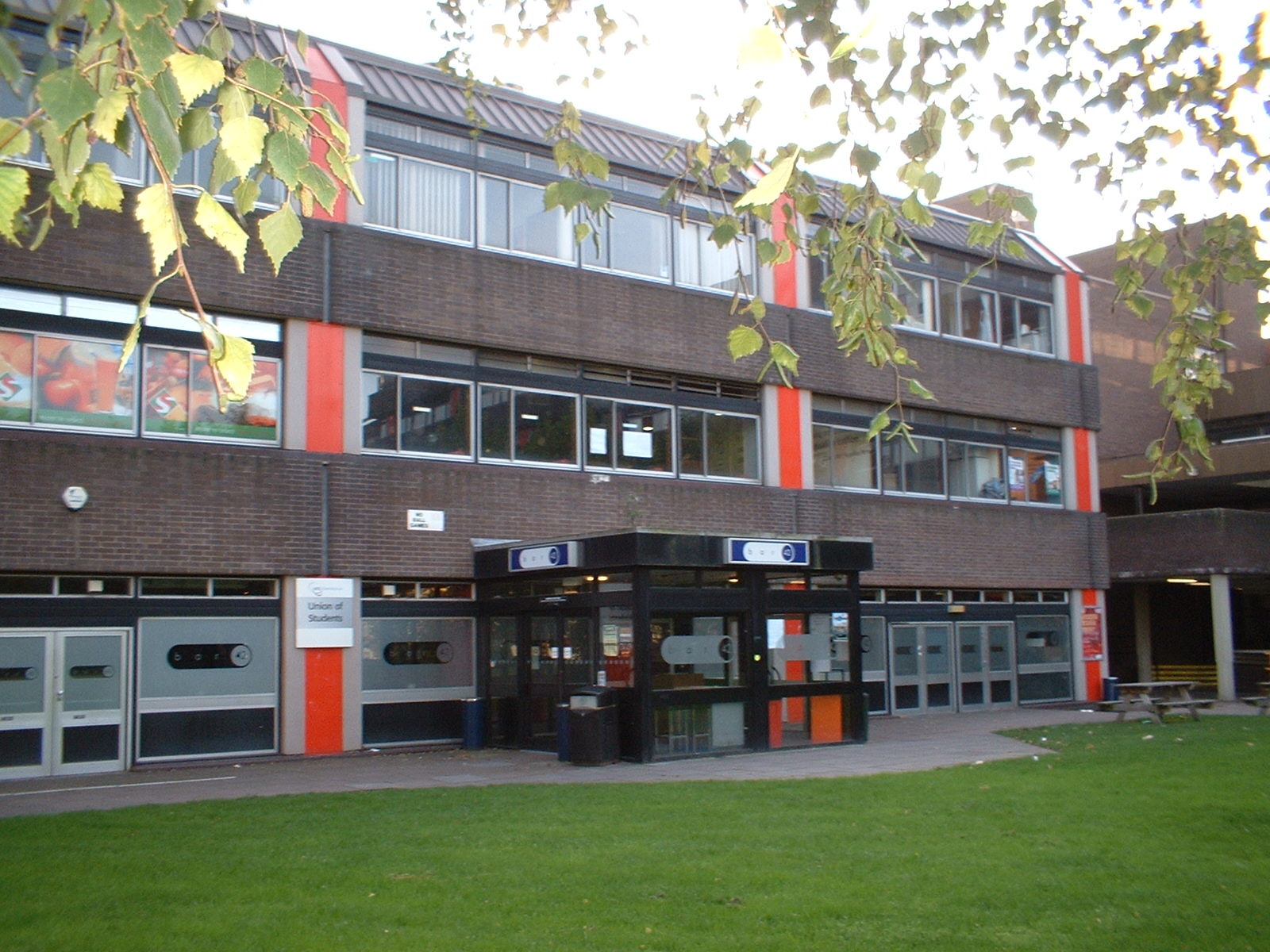
Lounge North, the Students' Union bar at City North Campus closed in 2015, and has since been demolished

Birmingham City University Students' Union (abbreviated to BCUSU) has its main offices at the city centre campus. There are several reception offices located at other campuses. BCUSU is affiliated with the National Union of Students, and all students are automatically members of the union.

Student media at the Union comprises a student magazine; Polygon, which originally went into publication in the 1980s and, after a short period under other names, was brought back to life in 2019, and the award-winning student radio station; Scratch Radio, which is housed in the Curzon Building at the City Centre Campus and broadcasts on DAB in the city and online.

The student union of Birmingham Polytechnic was condemned in November 1974 when its council passed a resolution supporting IRA terrorism. The polytechnic's student radio station, then known as Radio G, was the runner-up in the 1989 Guardian/NUS Student Media Awards.

Now Birmingham City Students' Union, it holds elections every year to elect the five full-time Sabbatical Officers who run the union and act as its Company Directors.

== Notable staff and alumni ==
Current and former staff of the university and its former entities include novelists Jim Crace and Stephen Booth, nurse-author Bethann Siviter, journalist Paul Bradshaw, scientist Kevin Warwick, environmentalist Chris Baines, politicians Khalid Mahmood (MP for Perry Barr) and Lynne Jones (former MP for Selly Oak), former Member of the European Parliament David Hallam, HSBC CEO Noel Quinn and former Chief Inspector of Probation for England and Wales Paul McDowell.

Notable graduates of the university and its predecessor institutions working in broadcasting include children's television presenter Kirsten O'Brien, sports TV presenter Mary Rhodes, radio and TV presenters Fiona Phillips and Margherita Taylor, investigative journalist Mark Williams-Thomas and Yemisi Akinbobola, founder of IQ4News and African Women in the Media. Several work in broadcast journalism, such as Sky News news presenter Marverine Cole, and BBC news presenter Charlie Stayt.

Art and design alumni include cartoonist Alex Hughes, artist Barbara Walker, fashion designer Betty Jackson, photographer Ravi Deepres, architect Laurie Baker (1917–2007), former Renault chief designer Patrick le Quément, and Saiman Miah, designer of the £5 Olympic coins for the 2012 Olympic Games.

Graduates in the performing arts include musicians Roy Priest (formerly of Sweet Jesus) and Nick Duffy, singer-songwriter Stephen Duffy, actors Jimi Mistry, Catherine Tyldesley and Tom Lister, comedian Frank Skinner, singer and The X Factor contestant Rhydian Roberts, and bass guitarist John Taylor, founder of Duran Duran.

== See also ==
- Armorial of UK universities
- List of universities in the UK
- Post-1992 universities
