= Paul McDowell =

Paul McDowell may refer to:

- Paul McDowell (actor) (1931–2016), English actor and writer
- Paul McDowell (Chief Inspector), former Chief Inspector of Probation for England and Wales
- Paul McDowell (rower) (1905–1962), American rower
