= Sweet Jesus =

1990s English band

Background information
- Origin: Birmingham, England
- Genres: Shoegaze, Glam revival
- Years active: 1990–1992
- Labels: Rough Trade (UK); Chapter 22
- Members: Ben Bentley; Roy Priest; Gavin Priest; Paul Collins
- Past members: Dave Priest

Sweet Jesus was an indie rock band formed in Birmingham, UK, in the 1990s. Formed following the breakup of rock band The Mossbacks, the band was championed by such magazines as Melody Maker and Volume, and amassed a modest catalogue of releases before suffering at the hands of the Rough Trade Records demise of the early 1990s.

The band were favourites of UK DJ duo Mark and Lard, with them heading the influential "Hit The North Show" on BBC Radio Five. The band's 1992 single Albino Ballerina was chosen as Mark Radcliffe's single of 1992 in his NME end-of-year roundup.

== History ==
Sweet Jesus was signed to Rough Trade Records in the early 1990s, being tipped as "one-to-watch" by the music press – along with Suede and PJ Harvey. On 18 August 1991, the band performed at Manchester's Boardwalk venue, supported by the first live appearance Oasis. Although not yet in the band, Noel Gallagher – along with Inspiral Carpets – watched the show. The band released an exclusive single through the Rough Trade Singles Club in November 1991, followed by three individual singles in 1992. In August of the same year, the band performed in the Session Tent at Reading Festival alongside Suede and Sunscreem.

Despite the band's work with producers Ray Shulman and Ian Broudie, the collapse of Rough Trade resulted in the group's premature disbanding.

=== Dissolution ===
==== Venus ====
Despite this setback, Bentley – along with Roy and Gavin Priest – formed Venus, releasing a number of records through PVC Records in 1994. Paul Collins did not contribute to the project, and was replaced by Vicky Gwinnut.

==== Groupie ====
Following Venus, Bentley and Gavin Priest proceeded to form Groupie (with Priest on electric guitar) – ultimately releasing two singles through Sacred Heart Records in 1997.

==== Butterfly Fan the Inferno ====
Paul Collins currently plays drums for Birmingham-based band Butterfly Fan the Inferno.

=== Current status ===
Until mid-2008, Ben Bentley had a profile on music networking website PeopleSound, streaming two solo songs. Roy Priest is currently assistant centre manager in Interactive Media at Birmingham City University's Technology Innovation Centre.

== Discography ==
=== Singles ===
- Honey Loving Honey (1991)

Rough Trade (UK)

- Phonefreak Honey (1992) UK No. 108

Rough Trade (UK)

- Real Babe (1992)

Rough Trade (UK)

- Albino Ballerina (1992)

Chapter 22

== Band members ==
- Ben Bentley – lead vocal, rhythm guitar
- Roy Priest – lead guitar
- Dave Priest – bass guitar (prior to "Albino Ballerina")
- Gavin Priest – bass guitar
- Paul Collins – drums
