= The Mandrake =

Satirical play by Niccolò Machiavelli

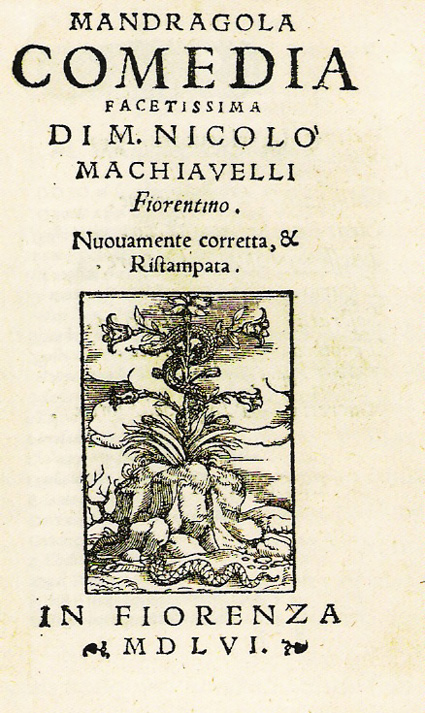
- Illustrated title page of the 1556 edition
- Original language: Italian
- Written by: Niccolò Machiavelli
- Characters: Callimaco; Siro; Messer Nicia; Ligurio; Sostrata; Friar Timoteo; A woman; Lucrezia
- Genre: Comedy
- Setting: The Florentine Republic, 1504

Premiere
- Date: Carnival season, 1526
- Place: Florence, Italy

The Mandrake (Italian: La Mandragola [la manˈdraːɡola]) is a satirical play by Italian Renaissance philosopher Niccolò Machiavelli. The five-act comedy was published in 1524. Though it is focused on private, non-political affairs, some scholars read into the play as being a mirror to his political treatises.

== Synopsis ==
The Mandrake takes place over a 24-hour period. The protagonist, Callimaco, desires to sleep with Lucrezia, the young and beautiful wife of an elderly fool, Nicia. Nicia above all else desires a son and heir, but still has none. Conspiring with both Ligurio, a rascally marriage broker, and a corrupt priest named Friar Timoteo, Callimaco masquerades as a doctor. He convinces Nicia to drug Lucrezia with mandrake, claiming it will increase her fertility. He adds, however, the dire warning that the mandrake will undoubtedly kill the first man to have intercourse with her. Ligurio helpfully suggests to Nicia that an unwitting fool be found for this purpose. A reluctant Lucrezia is eventually convinced by her mother and the priest to comply with her husband's wishes. She allows a disguised Callimaco into her bed and, believing that the events which caused her to break her marriage vows were due to divine providence, thereafter accepts him as her lover on a more permanent basis.

The play is mentioned in the 16th Letter of Amabed in Voltaire's Les Lettres d'Amabed (1769) stating that "the piece mocks the religion which Europe preaches, of which Rome is the centre, and the throne of which is the Papal See". Other critics like John Najemy have interpreted scenes with the priest as Machiavelli pointing out "the social and political necessity of interpreting religion".

== Modern revivals and adaptations ==
=== Revivals ===
The Mandrake, with Tom Hanks as Callimaco (center), in the Riverside Shakespeare Company production in New York, 1979

Wallace Shawn's translation, commissioned by Joseph Papp, was staged in 1977 at the Public Theater in Manhattan, and it launched Shawn's stage acting career as well. La Mandragola was performed in student-run theaters in the late 1960s.

The Riverside Shakespeare Company performed The Mandrake at the Casa Italiana in New York City in 1979, starring Tom Hanks as Callimaco. This run was directed by Dan Southern, with an original jazz score by pianist Michael Wolff, and Italian Renaissance sets by Gerard Bourcier.

The Mumeijuku Company performed La Mandragola, un Fiore Velenoso at the Sunshine Theater of Sunshine-City in Ikebukuro, Tokyo in 1981, starring Koji Yakusho as Callimaco and Tatsuya Nakadai as Nicia. This run was directed by Ms. Yasuko Miyazaki(Mrs. Tatsuya Nakadai), a.k.a. Ms. Tomoe Ryu, who has won the National Arts Festival (sponsored by the Agency for Cultural Affairs Japan) Excellence Award for directing Henrik Johan Ibsen's The Master Builder, Solness in 1980.

In 1984 Wallace Shawn's translation The Mandrake was produced at London's National Theatre.

The Long Beach Shakespeare Company mounted a production of The Mandragola in the Spring of 2011, directed by Helen Borgers.

=== Musicals and operas ===
La Mandragola, an opera by the composer Ignatz Waghalter, premiered at the Deutsches Opernhaus in Berlin in January 1914. The opera, richly melodic and deeply sympathetic in its treatment of human foibles, features a libretto by Paul Eger. It was warmly received by the critics, and was booked for a European tour that was aborted due to the outbreak of the First World War.

La Mandragola, an opera by Mario Castelnuovo-Tedesco opus 20, composed 1920–23, premiered in Venice 1926.

Michael Alfreds and Anthony Bowles wrote a 1968 musical adaptation, Mandrake, which has been performed in Edinburgh, London, New York, and elsewhere.

Another musical adaptation, Mandragola, composed by Doug Riley with libretto by Alan Gordon, made its debut in Canada over CBC Radio in October 1977, and was later issued on the CBC label as an LP record.

Pulitzer prize winning American composer William Bolcom adapted the story in operetta form with a libretto by Marc Campbell. Titled Lucrezia, the 50-minute work was commissioned by New York Festival of Song and premiered in 2008 with two pianos and a cast of five. A fully orchestrated version premiered at San Francisco Conservatory of Music in 2018.

Mandragola, an opera in Serbian by composer Ivan Jevtic, book by Dejan Miladinovic and lyrics by Vesna Miladinovic after Machiavelli, was given its world premiere in Belgrade at the Madlenianum Theatre on 16 December 2009.

=== Film ===
In 1965 an Italian film version was made by writer/director Alberto Lattuada.

A 2008 film version was made, The Mandrake Root. Adapted and directed by Malachi Bogdanov, it was shot in Sassari, Sardinia. Produced by European Drama Network, it was made in English with limited Italian sections, and it remains close to the original story. It was nominated for Best Drama of 2008 by the Royal Television Society Awards Midlands.

== See also ==
- Machiavelli as a dramatist
