= Simon M. Woods =

British entrepreneur

Simon M. Woods is a British entrepreneur, drama school Chief Executive, former music band manager and record company owner. Currently his film and script output cn be viewed on his web site www.europeandrama.com

Woods was the manager for the band UB40 after having seen them play at a pub for his birthday. He signed the group to Graduate Records who released "Food For Thought". After the release of their first album Woods set up Dep International that recorded and released UB40 internationally with label manager Den Turner. Despite there enormous success of Dep International Woods left the band in 1983 and started his own label, to which he signed Swans Way.

Woods ran his own marketing company before being hired by the Birmingham School of Acting, as chief executive of Birmingham School of Acting with trustees Peter Cannon, Carl Chinn, Annmarie Hanlon, Upkar Pardesi and Euan Rose. He founded the European Drama Network, a film production company which makes movies based on classic plays. Their first movie was The Mandrake Root; shot in Sardinia it was directed by Malachi Bogdanov and is based on a comedy first performed in Florence in 1526 and written by Niccolò Machiavelli in 1518. In a co-production with Warwick Business School, he wrote and directed The Inferno Show presents Machiavelli The Prince of Comedy, a short comedy to celebrate the 500th anniversary of the writing of The Prince. in 1513. He was developing a movie, From Ithaca With Love The Odyssey, a modern version of Homer's The Odyssey set in the modern day, but made in Ancient Greek and Latin, loosely based on a play of the same name he produced in 2006 with director Malachi Bogdanov as part of the New Generation Arts Festival. He abandoned this project in favour Penelope a retelling of The Odyssey entirely from the point of view odyssey Odysseus wife Penelope. He is currently writing thescript.
