= David Mba =

British academic

- Born: David Uzochukwesi Mba
- Education: University of Hertfordshire (BSc); Cranfield University (PhD)
- Scientific career
- Fields: Machine Condition Monitoring
- Workplaces: Andel De Montfort University; London South Bank University
- Thesis: Condition monitoring of slow speed rotating machinery using stress waves (1998)
- Academic advisors: R. H. Bannister
- Website: https://www.bcu.ac.uk/about-us/corporate-information/directorate

David Mba is the vice chancellor of Birmingham City University, UK. He was awarded the Institution of Mechanical Engineers Ludwig Mond Prize in 2010 for his contributions to the chemical industry. He serves on the advisory board of the Association for Black and Minority Ethnic Engineers (AFBE-UK).

== Education ==
Mba studied aerospace engineering at the University of Hertfordshire. He joined Cranfield University for his doctoral studies where he was awarded a PhD in 1998 for research supervised by R. H. Bannister.

== Career and research ==
Mba was awarded the Lord King Norton Gold medal for his thesis. He joined Cranfield University as a lecturer in 2001. Here he led Turbo-machinery group. Mba was made the Dean of School of Engineering at London South Bank University in 2014. He serves on the advisory board of the Association for Black and Minority Ethnic Engineers (AFBE-UK). He collaborated with AFBE-UK to try and improve the representation of black and minority ethnic engineers London South Bank University. He was made the Pro Vice-Chancellor and Dean of Computing and Engineering at De Montfort University in August 2017. He works on the gearbox of helicopters and ways to monitor their health. On the 18 July 2023, Birmingham City University announced Mba's appointment as new Vice-Chancellor, replacing Philip Plowden
