= Coast guards in Australia =

Agencies guarding Australian marine borders

Responsibilities for traditional coast guard duties in Australia are distributed across various federal, state and community agencies. The de facto coast guard of Australia is the Maritime Border Command, a joint command of the Australian Defence Force and the Australian Border Force which works alongside the Australian Federal Police, the Australian Fisheries Management Authority, and the Australian Maritime Safety Authority. Each state and territory government have specific maritime safety agencies and police marine units. In addition, there are several private volunteer coast guard organisations which act as auxiliary search and rescue services and maritime safety educators with the largest organisations being the Royal Volunteer Coastal Patrol established in 1937, the Australian Volunteer Coast Guard established in 1961, and Marine Rescue New South Wales established in 2009.

== Federal agencies ==
=== Maritime Border Command ===
The Maritime Border Command is the de facto coast guard of Australia. The Maritime Border Command is a joint unit of the Australian Defence Force (the Royal Australian Navy Patrol Force and the Royal Australian Air Force Surveillance and Response Group) and the Australian Border Force (Marine Unit and Coastwatch aircraft). It is responsible for border protection in the exclusive economic zone of Australia and its 19,650 kilometres of coastline and issues such as illegal fishing and exploitation of natural resources, maritime terrorism and piracy, biosecurity threats, and marine pollution. The Australian Federal Police supports the Maritime Border Command and particularly the Australian Border Force with criminal investigations, law enforcement and national security matters. From August to December 2021, the Maritime Border Command participated in the Royal Australian Navy and OCIUS Bluebottle trial of unmanned surface vehicle (USV). The purpose of the trial was to assess the use of the Bluebottle as a maritime surveillance system to support maritime security. They tested its ability to detect small boats that pose a threat within its area of operation.

=== Australian Maritime Safety Authority ===
The Australian Maritime Safety Authority is responsible for maritime safety and seaworthiness of Australian and foreign vessels in Australian waters including compulsory pilotage, aids to navigation, the Australian Rescue Coordination Centre and coordination of search and rescue operations, and management of Australia's international maritime obligations.

=== Australian Fisheries Management Authority ===
The Australian Fisheries Management Authority is responsible for the management and sustainable use of fisheries resources and for combating illegal fishing activities in the Australian Fishing Zone. There are three main branches: Fisheries Operations, Fisheries Management, and Corporate Services. Fisheries Operations is primarily responsible for combating illegal activities, data management, and international communication. Fisheries Management is responsible for economics and policy.

=== Office of Transport Security ===
The Office of Transport Security has various responsibilities for maritime security.

== State agencies ==
Each State Government also has agencies with coast guard responsibilities.

=== Queensland ===
Marine Rescue Queensland, a branch of the Queensland Police Service, is responsible for maritime safety and rescue.

=== Western Australia ===
Neither the Royal Volunteer Coastal Patrol nor the Australian Volunteer Coastguard are active in Western Australia, which is the largest state with the longest coastline. Inshore close to towns the West Australian Police co-ordinate local search and rescue between various state agencies (such as DOT, Fisheries and Water Police). Marine Rescue WA Groups form the core of the system with three main areas of emergency response / search and rescue (SAR), education, and radio monitoring. MR WA groups (37) are part of DFES (Department of Fire and Emergency Services) The 3 largest MR groups are part of DFES including Mandurah the oldest VMR group in WA.

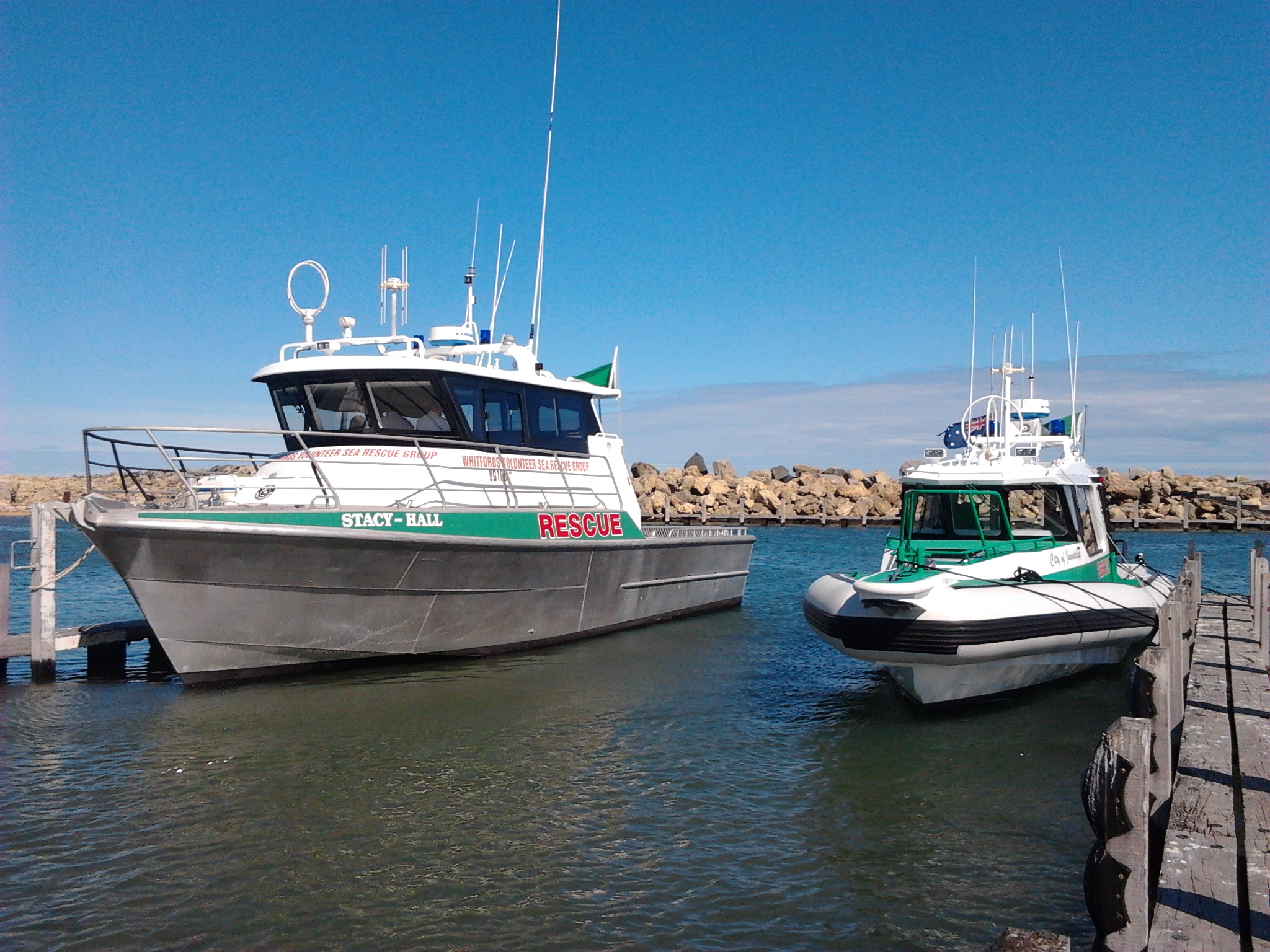
Whitford Volunteer Sea Rescue's two main lifeboats "Stacy Hall" (Left) and "city of Joondalup" (Right)

== Community organisations ==
In addition, there are several private volunteer coast guard organizations, the two largest organizations being the Royal Volunteer Coastal Patrol (established in 1937) and the Australian Volunteer Coast Guard (established in 1961). These volunteer organizations have no law enforcement powers, and are essentially auxiliary Search and Rescue services. In NSW these two organisations have joined to become Marine Rescue in 2009.

=== Marine Rescue NSW ===
In November 2008, the NSW Government announced the establishment of a new volunteer marine rescue organisation to be called Marine Rescue NSW, (MRNSW) which was incorporated in July 2009. Royal Volunteer Coastal Patrol, Australian Volunteer Coast Guard (NSW units) and Volunteer Rescue Association (marine units) united under the new organisation which began operation on 1 January 2010.

Marine Rescue NSW is a charitable organisation similar to the RNLI in Britain. It provides radio and rescue services over New South Wales with 44 units along the coast including two inland units and has over 3000 volunteers. It is also a registered training organisation ensuring that its members are trained and maintain competencies.

The NSW Government imposes an annual levy of $7 both on boat registration and on boat driver licences to provide funds for MRNSW to refurbish and replace old boats and equipment. As at 1 January 2016, MRNSW has refurbished a number of boats and purchased many new purpose-built boats. MRNSW members are volunteers and in addition to their duties as radio operators, boat crew and many other tasks spend large amounts of time raising funds needed in addition to those provided by the government.

=== Australian Volunteer Coast Guard ===
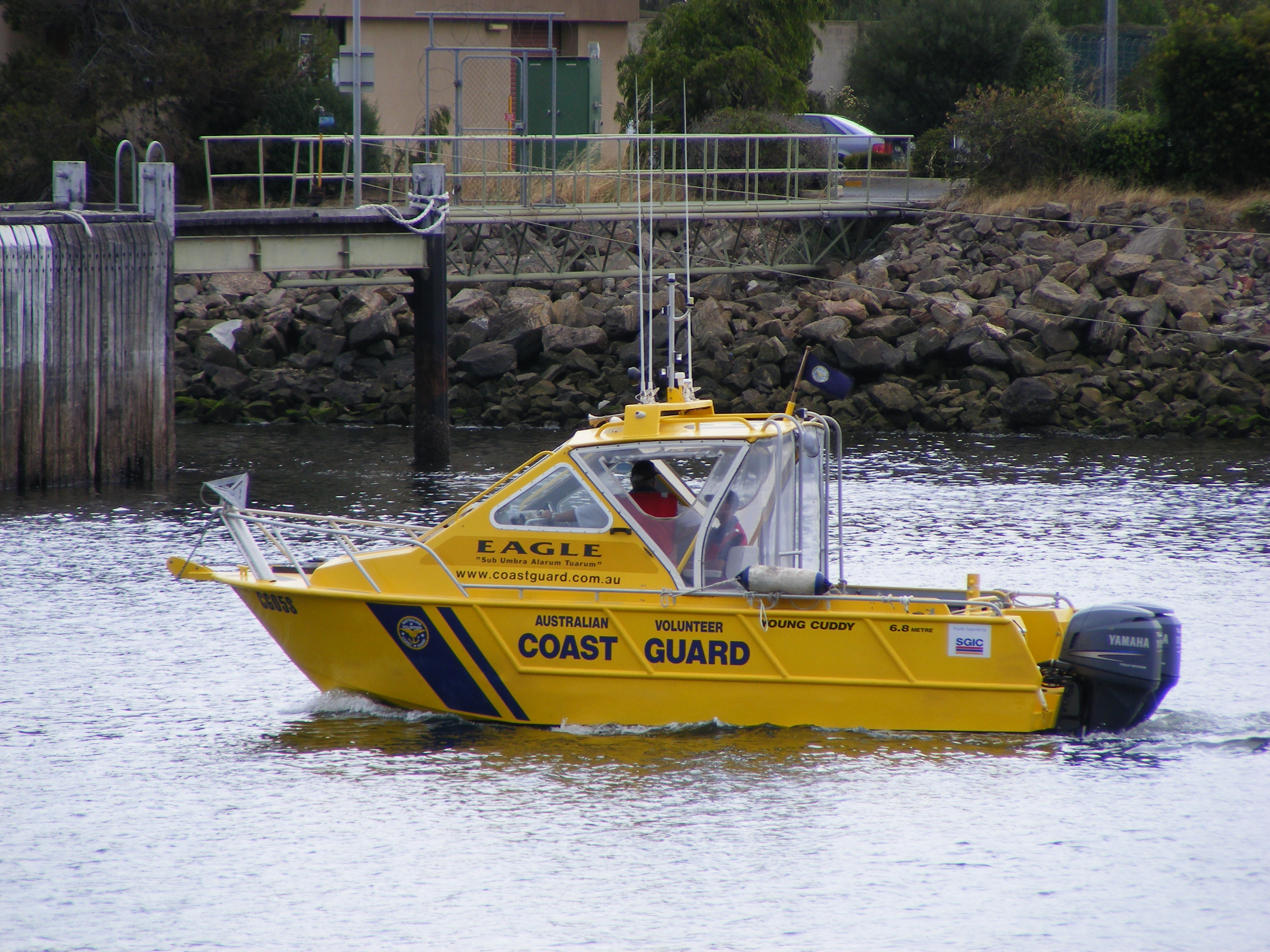
Australian Volunteer Coastguard vessel

The Australian Volunteer Coast Guard Association was established in 1961, and modelled on the US Coast Guard Auxiliary, the association is an organisation composed entirely of volunteers. It guards the coast in the most effective way – initially by education, example, examination and finally by search and rescue. The Australian Volunteer Coast Guard has no law enforcement powers. Flotillas and radio bases are located from the Skardon River in the Gulf of Carpentaria, down the eastern seaboard to Ceduna in South Australia, including Tasmania and major inland lakes and weirs. Coast Guard currently has more than 2,500 Regular members and 9,000 Associate members. Expansion is continuing in areas of need.

Australian Volunteer Coast Guard resources across Australia include:

- 107 Association-owned rescue vessels
- 147 radio bases under the control of 72 local flotillas
- 30 communication and display vans and 4WD vehicles
- Registered Training Organisations delivering competency based training
- Formal affiliations and collaborations with similar organisations in Australia, New Zealand, North America, the Philippines and Europe.

=== Royal Volunteer Coastal Patrol ===
In 1936 Commander Rupert Long, OBE, RAN, Director of Naval Intelligence raised with retired Captain Maurice Blackwood, DSO, RN the possibility of raising a group of trained yachtsmen as a Naval Auxiliary Service. Discussions were held with HWG Nobbs and W Giles, both Sydney yachtsmen and a proposal sent to the Australian Commonwealth Naval Board that a Volunteer Coastal Patrol be established under the command of Captain Blackwood. The Naval Board supported this and on 27 March 1937 the Volunteer Coastal Patrol was established under the command of Captain Blackwood, DSO, RN (rtd) with H.W.G. Nobbs as Staff Officer Operations and W Giles as Staff Officer Administration.

During World War II Coastal Patrol members became special constables and guarded commercial wharves, oil installations and bridges. By the war's end, patrol vessels had patrolled 128,000 miles of harbour and coastal waters and donated 393,000-man-hours of unpaid war service. They were granted the right to fly the Police Nemesis pennant as recognition of this service and the right to fly the New South Wales State Flag as their ensign.

Post war development saw the Patrol undertake civilian search and rescue operations as their primary role but maintain their original Royal Australian Navy inspired organisation structure, ranks and uniform. 1955 saw a democratically elected council formed which directed the development and administration of the Patrol and appointed the Officer Commanding. 1963 saw the Patrol become an incorporated company and the articles of association written. In 1974, Her Majesty the Queen granted the Patrol the privilege of adding the Royal prefix to its title when it became the Royal Volunteer Coastal Patrol (RVCP). In 2008 the NSW State Government after strong representations by RVCP agreed to the amalgamation of the three volunteer rescue organisations (RVCP, Volunteer Rescue Association (marine sections) and Australian Volunteer Coast Guard (NSW units) into one organisation which became Volunteer Marine Rescue NSW (VMRNSW) and commenced operation on 1 January 2010. Today VMRNSW works closely with all government agencies in search and rescue and education to the boating public. They maintain constant watch in Radio Bases for marine traffic, work with the Water Police in search and rescue as well as crowd control at major maritime events, run education classes in seamanship, navigation, first aid and meteorology for the public as well as providing constant information to Radio Stations and TV stations regarding sea conditions etc.

The NSW Government imposes an annual levy of $7 on boat registration and boat driver licences to fund the operation of VMRNSW which has enabled the replacement and refurbishment of many old boats and equipment. All members of the Patrol are volunteers with a large proportion of their time devoted to raising funds needed in addition to the government provision.

== Proposals for an Australian Coast Guard ==
After the Tampa affair, and the declaration of the war on terrorism, in 2001 Kim Beazley announced that the Australian Labor Party, if in government, would establish an Australian Coast Guard "responsible for conducting Australia's coastal surveillance and meeting Australia's maritime protection needs, including in relation to illegal immigration, drugs, fisheries, and quarantine-related issues". This plan met with criticism. Peter Reith criticised Beazley for stating that an Australian Coast Guard both will and will not be an "answer to the question of people smuggling". The plan was criticised by the Australian government, on the grounds that it would either be prohibitively expensive or inadequate to the task. Later, the motives for the establishment of an Australian Coast Guard were interpreted by some as "a plan to extend the capabilities of the Australian Federal Police."
