= Albino Ballerina =

1992 single by Sweet Jesus

Single by Sweet Jesus
- Released: 1992
- Genre: Glam rock, alternative rock
- Length: 3:17
- Label: Chapter 22
- Producer(s): John Rivers

Sweet Jesus singles chronology
"Real Babe" (1992)	"Albino Ballerina" (1992)

Audio sample
- file; help

Albino Ballerina is a song by English indie rock band Sweet Jesus. It was released (along with B-side Your Baby Loves Me) in 1992 through the Birmingham-based record label Chapter 22.

Although the band's earlier material was produced by Ray Shulman (previously of Gentle Giant and The Sugarcubes), Albino Ballerina was produced by John Rivers at Woodbine Studios in Leamington Spa.

== CD single ==
1. "Albino Ballerina" - 3:17
2. "Your Baby Loves Me" - 4:07
3. "Your Baby Loves Me" (original version) - 4:05

== 7" single ==
1. "Albino Ballerina" - 3:17
2. "Your Baby Loves Me" - 4:07

== Personnel ==
- Ben Bentley - lead vocal, rhythm guitar
- Roy Priest - lead guitar, vocals
- Gavin Priest - bass guitar
- Paul Collins - drums
- John Rivers - production

The single was the first release by the band featuring bassist Gavin Priest, following the departure of Dave Priest. Producer John Rivers engineered the record in Leamington Spa's Woodbine Studios, shortly after their installation of a digital ProTools system (being the first studio in Europe to use such a system for multitrack recording).

== Critical reception ==
The single was released through Chapter 22 Records (catalogue number CHAPCD70), a label that worked with the band following the demise of the group's previous label, Rough Trade. This relationship did not last however, and Albino Ballerina proved to be Sweet Jesus's last release. Although the group recorded and release further material through alternative labels and under different names, none of these achieved similar acclaim and the group officially disbanded.

Upon release, the song was chosen by radio DJ and music journalist Mark Radcliffe as the Single of the Year for his 1992 NME end-of-year roundup. This was tied in with promotion of the record via an interview on Radcliffe's "Hit the North" show in October 1992, which saw the band partially sharing the programme with Hank Marvin.

Although the single was not submitted for entry, it won Gary Crowley's Demo Crash Contest on Greater London Radio (now BBC London 94.9) on three consecutive occasions.
