= Phonefreak Honey =

Single by Sweet Jesus
- A-side: "Phonefreak Honey"
- B-side: "Peach, Baby Blue"
- Released: February 1992
- Genre: Alternative rock, shoegaze
- Length: 2:34
- Label: Rough Trade (UK)
- Songwriter(s): Ben Bentley, Roy Priest
- Producer(s): Ray Shulman

Sweet Jesus singles chronology
"Honey Loving Honey" (1992)	"Phonefreak Honey" (1992)	"Real Babe" (1992)

Phonefreak Honey is a song by Birmingham-based band Sweet Jesus, and was their first fully available single. It was released on Rough Trade Records (catalogue number R284) in 1992.

== Information ==
Despite a previous release by the band (Honey Loving Honey) earlier in 1992, Phonefreak Honey was the first widely available single (the former was an exclusive Rough Trade Singles Club release).

The title track was produced by Ray Shulman, with the two B-sides being produced by Dave Morris. Paul Lester, of Melody Maker, described the title track's production in a February 1992 article:

You couldn't guess what they were singing about, however – Ben [Bentley]'s androgynous falsetto (very Diana Ross) and Roy [Priest]'s hoover-wired-up-to-a-studio-console guitar (very Blondie-produced-by-Kevin Shields) mean that all the words are lost in the mix.

— Paul Lester, Melody Maker (1992),

=== Critical reception ===
Phonefreak Honey was Melody Maker's Single of the Week for the issue published on 8 February 1992.

== Track listing ==
1. Phonefreak Honey (2:34)
2. Peach (2:53)
3. Baby Blue (1:59)
