= School of Architecture, Built Environment, Computing and Engineering, Birmingham City University =

Department of Birmingham City University

Coordinates: 52°28′58.00″N 1°53′7.47″W

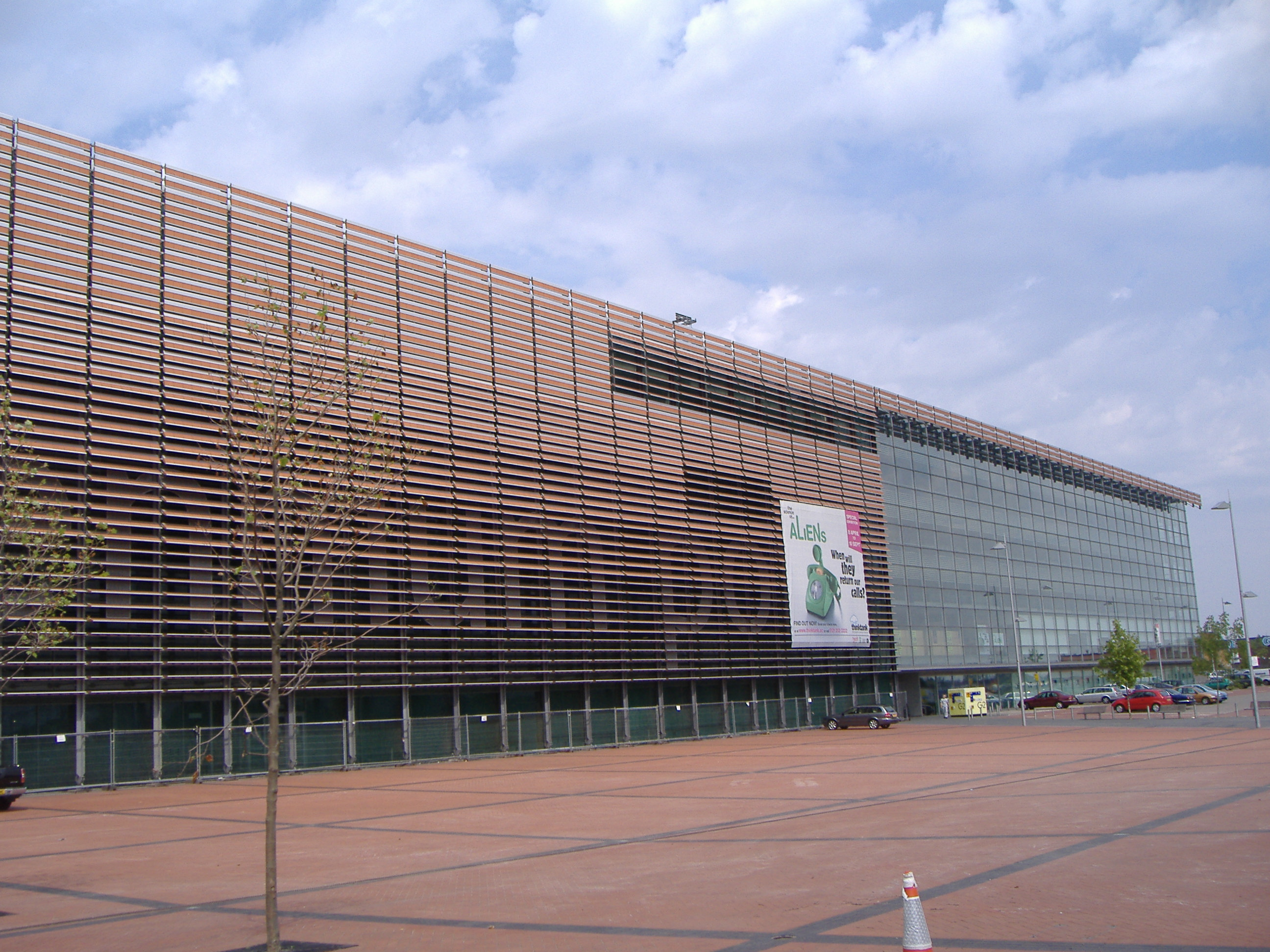
- The eastern half of the Millennium Point complex where the faculty is located.
- Former names: Technology Innovation Centre; Technology Innovation and Development; Faculty of TEE
- Type: School
- Established: 2000 (as Technology Innovation Centre); 2009 (as Faculty of TEE); 2014 (as Faculty of CEBE)
- Affiliations: Birmingham City University
- Location: Birmingham, West Midlands, United Kingdom
- Campus: City Centre Campus, Millennium Point
- Website: Official website

The School of Architecture, Built Environment, Computing and Engineering (formerly the Faculty of Computing, Engineering and the Built Environment) is a department of Birmingham City University, England. It is located in the City Centre campus in the eastern half of the Millennium Point complex. Spanning five stories of a complex in the Eastside district, the centre offers undergraduate and postgraduate courses in architecture, computing, engineering and construction and the built environment.

== History ==
The school was previously known as the Technology Innovation Centre, but in 2008 the faculty was rebranded as the Faculty of Technology, Engineering and the Environment. The faculty now includes the Department of Computing which has combined with TIC's departments of software, networks, telecommunications and electronics; and the School of Property, Construction and Planning, forming four schools including School of Computing, Telecommunications and Networks (CTN); School of Digital Media Technology; School of Engineering, Design and Manufacturing Systems (EDMS); and School of Property, Construction and Planning. The rebranding coincides with the development of a new campus in the city's Eastside regeneration scheme. In 2014, the faculty was again rebranded to the Faculty of Computing, Engineering and the Built Environment.

== Departments ==
The school has three departments. The Department of Computer Science runs academic subject disciplines such as electronics, cyber security, embedded systems, telecommunications, networks, software engineering and games technology. It has developed both vocational and non-vocational learning, with blended distance teaching and learning approaches.

The Department of Engineering offers courses in engineering and related disciplines. There is a choice of undergraduate and postgraduates courses ranging from civil and mechanical engineering, electrical engineering, medical imaging and sound engineering.

The Department of Architecture and Built Environment offers accredited courses at undergraduate and postgraduate level in architectural technology, practice and landscape architecture.
