= Birmingham City University City Centre Campus =

City Centre Campus
- Type: Media, Arts and Engineering
- Established: 2013
- Location: Birmingham, England
- Affiliations: Birmingham City University
- Website: http://www.bcu.ac.uk/news-events/city-centre-campus

Birmingham City University City Centre Campus (known informally as Eastside Campus and tentatively as Creative Campus) "flagship" campus in the centre of Birmingham. It was constructed next to the existing facilities at Millennium Point and is part of the ambitious Eastside project - Birmingham's biggest physical regeneration scheme. The campus is the new home for media, arts and engineering learning and includes fully operational television studios, a library, performance theatre, lecture theatres and a learning resource centre.

A planning application was approved in September 2009. Phase one of the build was completed in time for September 2013 with a second phase of the development expected to open in 2015. Birmingham-based Associated Architects have designed the facility around the general principles of "spacial efficiency, sustainability and functional suitability". It includes an open courtyard, a large atrium and an elevated bridge link into the Universities existing occupied areas of Millennium Point.

Existing facilities at the Gosta Green and Bournville Campuses were moved to the new facilities as the University seeks to reduce the number of campuses it occupies. Margaret Street will be retained along with Vittoria Street and, for the time being, City North Campus.

== Delays ==
On 11 March 2010, the Government announced that it plans to create a high-speed rail link between London and Birmingham. The Government’s plans include the creation of a new rail station at Eastside, on the same plot earmarked for the University’s proposed city centre campus for which outline planning permission has already been granted. The University had chosen Eastside because of its designation as the Learning and Leisure Zone for Birmingham. It was also adjacent to the University’s Faculty of Technology, Engineering and the Environment (TEE) and Birmingham School of Acting, which are based in neighbouring Millennium Point.

=== Possibility ===
The decision has complicated the process of planning for a number of development schemes on the site, including a new campus for Birmingham University, the council said. Glenn Howells, managing director of Glenn Howells Architects, the firm appointed by Birmingham City Council, said: "The announcement that the planned station linking Birmingham to London in 45 minutes will be in the heart of Eastside presents huge opportunities and significant challenges if the full potential of the new station and this part of the city are to be realised." Schemes already lined up for the Eastside quarter include the Birmingham City University Campus, a City Park, VTP Tower and various residential developments. Some of these schemes are proposed for the same land that has now been identified for elements of the rail link. The high-speed plans could be altered by the new government, but a spokesman for Birmingham City Council said that it was unlikely that it would reroute any of the Birmingham section. He said: "The route might not be built for 20 years, so we want to know what parts of our plans we can progress without having to wait that long.

=== Redesign ===
Birmingham's unsuccessful bid to become the first UK City of Culture in 2013 was built around three major developments due for completion in 2013. They are the new £189 million library of Birmingham, City University’s £130 million Creative Campus and a £9.7 million wing dedicated to the city’s global heritage at Birmingham Museum and Art Gallery. Winning the title could be worth up to £800 million to the region’s economy and see the city playing host to star-studded events. Glenn Howells Architects has been called in to come up with a new masterplan for the Eastside area in the light of the proposed rail connection, which will mean revisiting plans for City Park, the Birmingham City University campus and the Vertical Theme Park.
