= The Mandrake Root =

- Directed by: Malachi Bogdanov
- Written by: Malachi Bogdanov (adaption)
- Produced by: Rosanna Castangia; Carlo Dessi; Simon M. Woods
- Starring: Jason Nicoli; Chara Jackson; Geoffrey Bateman; Mike Rogers; Jonathan Owen; Craig Painting
- Cinematography: Tony Yates
- Edited by: Malachi Bogdanov; Nat Higginbottom; Simon M. Woods
- Music by: Christopher Ash
- Production company: European Drama Network
- Distributed by: European Drama Network
- Release dates: 20 June 2008 (UK); 7 August 2008 (Italy)
- Running time: 75 minutes
- Countries: United Kingdom; Italy
- Languages: English; Italian
- Budget: £200,000

The Mandrake Root is a 2008 comedy drama film adapted and directed by Malachi Bogdanov as his first feature film. The film was produced by Simon M. Woods as the first film release of European Drama Network.

Based on the play La Mandragola (The Mandrake) written by Niccolò Machiavelli in 1518, the film was nominated for the Best Drama 2008 by the Royal Television Society Awards Midland.

== Production ==
The Mandrake Root was shot in 14 days in Sassari, on the Mediterranean island of Sardinia. The movie crew was from both the UK and Italy, with lead cast from the UK.

While the original play La Mandragola was set in Florence, Italy in 1504, the film relocates the story to Sassari in Sardinia, Italy, in a similar period. The action takes place over a period of 24 hours. The comedy’s main theme is the use of deceit and the interplay among the characters who think they are shrewder than the next. The opening prologue was written by Machiavelli and is read at the start of the film, just as it is in the play. The script is largely faithful to the original play.

== Plot ==
Callimaco (Jason Nicoli) is taken by the beauty of Lucrezia (Chara Jackson), but she is the loyal wife of Nicia (Geoffrey Bateman), a rich and foolish lawyer. Callimaco hires the service of a shady 'fixer' named Ligurio (Mike Rogers) to aid in his quest to sleep with her. Ligurio informs Callimaco that Nicia and Lucrezia are anxious to have a child. With the fixer's help, Callimaco masquerades as a doctor and convinces Nicia that the best way for Lucrezia to conceive a child is by her taking a potion made from the Mandrake Root. He lies and warns Nicia that the first man to sleep with Lucrezia after she has taken the potion will die within eight days. Together they devise a plan to kidnap a stranger to sleep with Lucrezia and draw out the poison. Callimaco then disguises himself and arranges to be the one who is kidnapped. Lucrezia is an honorable woman and does not at first agree to meet with the stranger. Nicia gets both Lucrezia's mother, a woman of ill repute, and her confessor Brother Timoteo (Jonathan Owen), a priest of low morals, to aid in convincing Lucrezia of the necessity of the plan. After finally sleeping with Lucrezia, Callimaco confesses everything. Lucrezia gives thought to the duplicity of her husband, her mother, and her confessor, and decides that she now wants Callimaco as a lover forever. Callimaco gets what he had desired and everyone else continues to believe that each had outwitted the others.

== Cast and Crew ==
- Jason Nicoli as Callimaco
- Chara Jackson as Lucrezia
- Geoffrey Bateman as Nicia
- Mike Rogers as Ligurio
- Jonathan Owen as Brother Timoteo
- Emanuela Di Biase as The Lady
- Andrea Foddai as Road Sweeper
- Mario Olivieri as Road Sweeper
- Craig Painting as Siro
- Den Woods as Sostrata
- Neil Hillman - Sound Designer

== Release ==
The film had its United Kingdom theatrical debut in June 2008, and its European/Italian theatrical debut in August 2008, at the Sardinia Film Festival and was made available on DVD and video on demand internationally online in Europe from European Drama Network and in North America from Reframe .

== Reception ==
While noting that it was getting an outdoor premiere prior to its home cinema release, Birmingham What's On wrote that "the first feature by award-winning stage director Malachi Bogdanov... ...makes the most of a low budget", "The cast have a nice line in sly humour and keep the pace brisk with some nice comic timing...", and "it is playful fun that, at 75 minutes, does the job without overstaying its welcome".
