= Ravi Deepres =

British artist

Ravi Deepres is a British artist who works with lens based and screen based media. He has worked extensively with contemporary dance companies, including Wayne McGregor Random Dance Company (UK) and Karas (Japan), and with the British avant garde music group, :zoviet*France:. His first solo exhibition, Patriots, shown at the Hatton Gallery, Newcastle upon Tyne, UK, in 2003, explored aspects of patriotic and national identity around the football World Cup and European Championships.

Deepres works as a lecturer in photography and moving image at the Birmingham Institute of Art and Design, part of Birmingham City University.

== Selected screen based works ==
- still.moving - A collaboration with :zoviet*France:, commissioned by David Metcalfe Associates (Newcastle upon Tyne, UK), for screening during live performances by :zoviet*France:.
- Tyneside Journey (2000) - A collaboration with :zoviet*France:, commissioned by Newcastle City Council, UK.
- Tremor (2005) Commissioned by Channel 4 and Arts Council England. Sound by :zoviet*France:.
- Runner (2006) - A co-directed and produced with Michael Baig Clifford. Commissioned by the Great North Run Cultural Programme (Newcastle and Gateshead), UK. Soundtrack by :zoviet*France:.
- Obscura (2007) - A choreographed film about the loss of sight and the gaze using the creation of a moving camera obscura. Screened at Royal Academy London, as an installation at Rugby Museum and Art Gallery, Star Space Shanghai, Hereford Film Festival, and Wolverhampton Art Gallery.

== Selected photographic projects ==
- Absolute Zero (2000) - Original photography for the artwork of the compilation CD album Absolute Zero.
- Patriots (2003) - First solo exhibition, Hatton Gallery, Newcastle upon Tyne, UK.
