= European Drama Network =

European Drama Network is a producer and online distributor of modern movies of classic plays and texts. Founded by producer Simon M. Woods in 2007, its first film was The Mandrake Root, based on the play The Mandrake by Niccolò Machiavelli in 1518, and directed by Malachi Bogdanov. In a co-production with Warwick Business School it produced a short comedy The Inferno Show presents Machiavelli The Prince of Comedy with Machiavelli trapped in hell and finding it not like his dream. Currently the company is developing the movie From Ithaca With Love The Odyssey based on Homer's The Odyssey which will be set in the modern day but made in Ancient Greek and Latin and will be subtitled into 40 languages and distributed free to every school and university in the world. The film is loosely based on a play of the same name produced by the company's founder as part of the New Generation arts Festival in Birmingham in 2006.

European drama network was founded with the aim of making modern movies from classic plays and bringing them to a global audience via the internet, because many these plays and stories would struggle to find an outlet in mainstream cinema or TV.
