= Paul McDowell (Chief Inspector) =

Paul McDowell is a former Her Majesty's Chief Inspector of Probation for England and Wales. He led HM Inspectorate of Probation (HMIP) from 2014 to 2015, replacing Liz Calderbank. He had been Chief Executive of Nacro and a Prison Governor in Her Majesty's Prison Service.

== Education ==
McDowell graduated from the University of Central England (now Birmingham City University) in 1998 with a Diploma in Criminal Justice. He was later awarded a master's degree in Criminology and Prison Studies at the University of Cambridge. He was awarded an Honorary Doctorate from Birmingham City University in 2015.

== Career ==
=== HM Prison Service ===
McDowell worked in Her Majesty's Prison Service for nearly 20 years. He was the Governor of HM Prison Coldingley (2003-2006) and then HM Prison Brixton (2006-2009). During his three years in charge of Brixton Prison, he developed a violence reduction policy that saw assault rates halved, and saw progress in challenging attitudes in relation to cultural diversity that was recognised by the Commission for Racial Equality.

He had previously been a junior prison governor at HM Prison Gartree and Deputy Governor at HM Prison Feltham, a young offender institution. He was due to take over as Governor at HM Prison Wandsworth when he was approached to work at Nacro.

=== Nacro ===
McDowell was the Chief Executive of Nacro, the crime reduction charity, from 2009 to 2014. He introduced significant organisational change, relaunching its business strategy to focus on support service provision for offenders.

=== HM Inspectorate of Probation ===
His appointment as Her Majesty's Chief Inspector of Probation (HMIP) was announced by Secretary of State for Justice, Chris Grayling, in November 2013 following approval by the Justice Select Committee of the House of Commons the previous month. He started in the role in February 2014.

McDowell resigned as Chief Inspector in February 2016 after it was announced that the company his wife worked for, Sodexo Justice Services, was chosen by the Ministry of Justice to run probation services in six local areas from April 2016. As HMIP would be inspecting the company's probation practice it was considered that there was a perceived conflict of interests.
