= Birmingham Polytechnic Institution =

UK university (1843–1853)

Birmingham Polytechnic Institution was a polytechnic formed in 1843 in Birmingham, England. It was supported by leading Liberals in the city such as George Dawson. The Polytechnic mainly taught languages, chemistry and mathematics and had a library of 4,000 volumes. George Battison Haines, who was involved with the local freehold land movement, acted as librarian. Charles Dickens was among the visiting academics who gave speeches at the Polytechnic, he gave a speech for the Polytechnic in the Birmingham Town Hall in May 1846. Other guest lecturers included Sir Robert Peel, who gave a lecture on Switzerland.

In 1845 the dramatist Douglas Jerrold presided over a meeting of the Polytechnic where its second literary soiree was held. He was presented with an "elegant gold ring" by the jewellers of the city and he gave what is said to have been his first public speech.

Although the Polytechnic had over 500 members at one stage, including over 100 women, support fell away with the institution not commanding as much support from the middle and working classes as had been hoped for. The Polytechnic closed in 1853.
