= Marine Rescue Queensland =

Marine rescue service in Queensland, Australia

Department overview
- Formed: 1 July 2024
- Preceding agencies: Australian Volunteer Coast Guard; Volunteer Marine Rescue
- Type: marine rescue
- Jurisdiction: Queensland
- Motto: rescue ready
- Annual budget: A$27M (2024)
- Minister responsible: Dan Purdie, Minister for Police and Community Safety
- Department executive: Tony Wulff, Chief Officer
- Parent department: Queensland Police Service
- Key document: Marine Rescue Queensland Bill 2023
- Website: www.mrq.qld.gov.au

Marine Rescue Queensland (MRQ) is the primary provider of marine rescue in the state of Queensland.

== History ==
In October 2022, following a review by State Disaster Co-ordinator Steve Gollschewski, it was announced that the Queensland Fire and Emergency Services would be dissolved in June 2024, resulting in the largest reform of emergency services in Queensland since 1990. The Queensland Fire and Rescue Service along with the Rural Fire Service would form the Queensland Fire Department, with a new central headquarters. On 1 July 2024 the Queensland State Emergency Service will be merged with the Queensland Police Service along with the Volunteer Marine Rescue and the Australian Volunteer Coast Guard Queensland, which itself is to be renamed Marine Rescue Queensland (MRQ) and therefore made part of the Queensland emergency services.

== Facilities ==
The formation of the MRQ would merge 27 Volunteer Marine Rescue and 19 Australian Volunteer Coast Guard stations.

== Emblem ==
The Marine Rescue Queensland badge was designed to recognise the history of both the former Volunteer Marine Rescue and Australian Volunteer Coast Guard.

== Leadership ==
Period	Name	Notes
Chief Officer, Marine Rescue Queensland
19 February 2024–Present	Tony Wulff	First ever appointed Chief Officer of the newly formed Maritime Rescue Queensland.
