= Bethann Siviter =

Bethann Siviter (born 1963) is a British Registered Nurse and author originally from the United States. She overcame sudden illness and resulting disability to return to work in the NHS and has since used her experiences as a patient to highlight issues in healthcare delivery. Her American nursing education did not transfer to the UK, so upon relocation in 1999, she earned a BSc in Community Nursing.

In May 2004, Siviter wrote The Student Nurse Handbook, a guide for nursing students. Mrs Siviter is known for her work as an advocate for disabled people, herself becoming disabled as a result of an illness in 2006. Her used of an assistance dog from the charity Canine Partners was highlighted as the first use of an assistance dog by an NHS Nurse.
