= Malachi Bogdanov =

British theatre director

Malachi Bogdanov is a theatre director. He was Associate Director of the English Shakespeare Company (1997–2000), and directed international tours of productions including A Midsummer Night's Dream, A Threepenny Opera, Romeo and Juliet, Hamlet, Titus Andronicus and an award-winning production of Richard the Third (UK and Australian Tour – Herald Angel for best production at the Edinburgh Festival). Currently a freelance artist, he has directed over 70 professional shows and works all over the world.

In 2003, he wrote and directed Bill Shakespeare's Italian Job at the Edinburgh Festival and was the subject of a BBC documentary. In 2004, it also toured to the Neuss International Shakespeare Festival in Germany as well as returning to the Edinburgh Festival Fringe. He has directed a number of shows for the Neuss festival including his productions of Macbeth Kill Shakespeare (2004) and a new adaptation of Marlowe's Edward the Second (2006). That same year, Malachi directed "Modern Cautionary Tales for Children" written and performed by Murray Lachlan Young. The show toured throughout the UK and gained five star reviews from The Scotsman and The List during its run at the Edinburgh Festival Fringe.

In Italy, Malachi has directed a new version of Alice in Wonderland for La Botte E Il Cilindro as well as directing Dracula, L'Anconitana, A Midsummer Night's Dream, Romeo and Juliet, The Taming of the Shrew and The Merchant of Venice all in Italian and produced by MabTeatro. In February 2006, Malachi directed for MabTeatro the Italian version of Macbeth Kill Bill Shakespeare that toured Italy.

In the UK, Malachi has directed Stone Soup (2005), Pandora's Box (2006 Birmingham MAC and Edinburgh Festival), and Pinocchio (MAC 2006). In 2006, he was commissioned to write and direct a new version of the Odyssey, "From Ithaca With Love", which was performed in June 2006 to celebrate the opening of the Millennium Point building in Birmingham.

In 2007. Malachi directed his first feature film The Mandrake Root for which he also wrote the screenplay. The film was shot in the city of Sassari (Sardinia, Italy) for the production company European Drama Network and nominated by the Royal Television Society for best drama.
