= Harry Harvey =

Harry Harvey may refer to:

- Harry Harvey (Medal of Honor, 1865) (1846–1896), American soldier during Civil War
- Harry Harvey (Medal of Honor, 1901) (1873–1929), American Marine during Philippine–American War
- Harry Harvey Sr. (1901–1985), American character actor
- Harry Harvey Jr. (1929–1978), American actor in Forbidden Planet, son of Harry Harvey Sr.
- Harry Harvey (politician), Northern Ireland Assembly member since 2019
- Harry Harvey (artist) (1922-2011), British stained glass artist

== See also ==
- Henry Harvey (disambiguation)
- Harold Harvey (disambiguation)
