= Henry Hervey =

Henry Hervey may refer to:

- Henry Hervey, 1st Baron Hervey, of the Barons Hervey
- Henry Hervie, Archdeacon of Middlesex

== See also ==
- Henry Harvey (disambiguation)
