= Ronald Pennell =

British artist, engraver and sculptor

Ronald Pennell is a British artist, engraver, especially in glass engraving, and sculptor.

== Early life ==
Pennell was born and grew up in Birmingham. He received early training at the Moseley School of Art, and subsequently at Birmingham School of Art (1952–1956) was a pupil of Cyril Shiner.

== Gem engraving ==
In 1957 Pennell received a German scholarship to study gem engraving. Working under the gem-engraver Hermann Waldmann in Idar-Oberstein, Pennell began a long association with German and central European art and education. He later developed a personal friendship and professional relationship with the Czech glass engraver Jiri Harcuba, as well as with teachers and students at the Prague Academy of Arts, Architecture and Design.

On his return to England Pennell was appointed lecturer at Birmingham College of Art where he met his wife, Betty, and taught metal engraving, drawing and design. In the same year he was elected a Fellow of the Royal Society of Arts. Pennell continued to maintain contacts in Germany, entering exhibition and design competitions. In 1964, he and Betty left teaching to establish freelance studios in rural Herefordshire. Concentrating on developing his range, including bronze medallic art, Pennell refrained from exhibiting his work until 1974, when he was offered a solo show organised by the newly restructured Crafts Council of Great Britain.

== Glass engraving ==
In 1977, Pennell began to engrave on glass, adapting gem engraving techniques to a larger scale. Initially working with commercially available glass vessels, he later transferred to working on vessel blanks, free-blown to his specification by the glass artist Carl Nordbruch. In addition to working on clear, colourless glass, Pennell broadened his approach to include cased, flashed and graal glasses. In 1979, he exhibited at the Corning Museum World Glass Exhibition and World Tour, which brought his work to international attention. He was also represented in the Corning Museum New Glass Review throughout the 1980s. His work displays a complex, humorous iconography, in which an everyman figure (often represented by the artist, watched over by his Jack Russell Terrier) engages with forces of nature which may be agrarian, or embodied in the forms of crocodiles, owls, women and mythical beings.

== Sculpture ==
Pennell also works as a sculptor, producing medals and reliefs in cast bronze, examples of which are in the collections of the British Museum and Goldsmiths' Hall in London. A group of larger scale animal sculptures in stained wood date mainly from the 1990s. He created a new series of figurative sculpture in cast glass following his professorship at the University of Wolverhampton.

== Exhibitions and collections ==
Since 1974, Pennell has exhibited in Britain, Europe, the United States and Japan, including regular exhibitions this century in London and internationally with Contemporary Applied Arts. In 1999 a comprehensive retrospective exhibition of his work, Modern Myths: The Art of Ronald Pennell in Glass and Bronze organised by Wolverhampton Art Gallery toured the UK. In 2013 he and Betty held a joint exhibition, Gardens – Myths – Magic, at the Ruthin Craft Centre. His work is in collections including those of the Toyama Glass Art Museum, The Victoria & Albert Museum; The National Museum of Applied Arts, Prague; The Musée Nationale des Arts Decoratifs, Paris; Hokkaido Museum of Modern Art; Koganezaki Glass Museum, Japan; Ebeltoft Museum, Denmark; Corning Museum of Glass, Corning, New York; Nottingham Castle Museum; Norwich Castle Museum.

== Later life ==
Although leaving formal teaching in 1964, Pennell has maintained a career as an educator. He holds a Professorial Fellowship (from 1993) at the Academy of Arts, Architecture and Design in Prague, where he was also awarded the Gold Medal (1993) and the Highest Honour (1996). He was also Visiting Professor of Glass Studies at the University of Wolverhampton (1998-2001).

In 2005 Pennell was interviewed by the British Library for the National Life Stories Collection.

A bibliography relating to Ronald Pennell's career until 1999 is listed in Modern Myths: The art of Ronald Pennell in glass and bronze, Antique Collectors’ Club, 1999. In 1988, The Welsh Arts Council commissioned a film "Ronald Pennell – engraver" for the Arts Channel.
