= St Wulfram's Church, Grantham =

Parish church in Lincolnshire, England

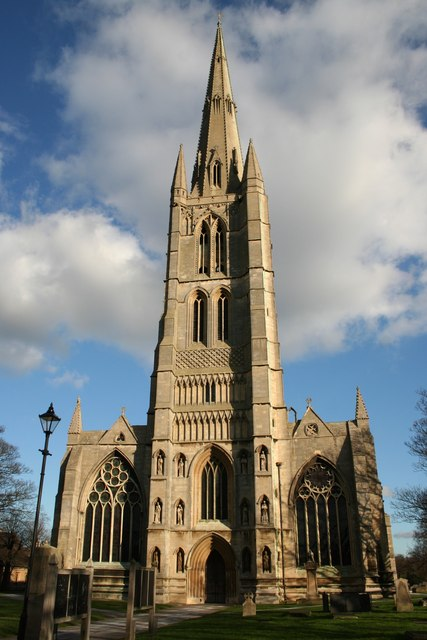
- Parish Church of St Wulfram, Grantham

- Location within Lincolnshire
- 52.9148°N 0.6407°W
- OS grid reference: SK 91498 36145
- Location: Grantham, Lincolnshire
- Country: England
- Denomination: Church of England
- Churchmanship: Broad Church/Inclusive catholic
- Website: stwulframs.org.uk discoverstwulframs.org.uk

History
- Dedication: Wulfram of Sens

Architecture
- Heritage designation: Grade I listed

Specifications
- Capacity: Seating for 700, room for a further 200 standing
- Length: 196 feet (60 m)
- Width: 75 feet (23 m)

Administration
- Province: Canterbury
- Diocese: Lincoln
- Archdeaconry: Lincoln
- Deanery: Grantham
- Parish: Grantham

Clergy
- Rector: Fr Stuart Cradduck (Rector) Fr Peter Pathikrit Das (Associate Rector)

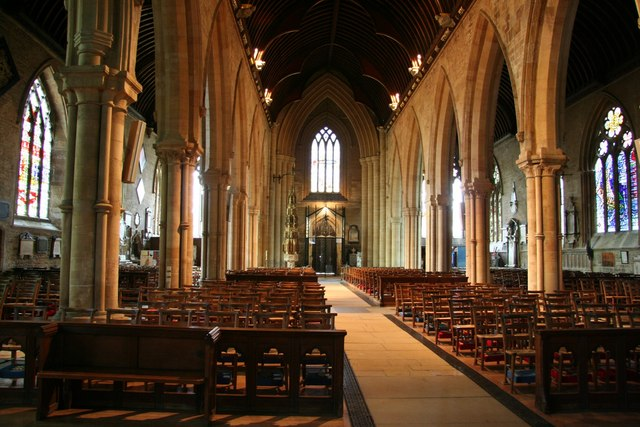
The nave of St Wulfram's, looking west

St Wulfram's Church, Grantham, is the Anglican parish church of Grantham in Lincolnshire, England. The church is a Grade I listed building and has the second tallest spire in Lincolnshire after St James' Church, Louth.

== Vicars ==
The Reverend William Glaister was the curate and later vicar of the church in 1876. His sister Elizabeth Glaister was a novelist with an interest in embroidery. She created ecclesiastical embroideries for the church.

== The spire ==
In his book England's Thousand Best Churches, Simon Jenkins begins his description of St Wulfram's: "Here is the finest steeple in England", and in 2020 an online contest run by poet Jay Hulme named it as the finest non-cathedral English church.

The spire, at 274 feet (84 m), is the sixth highest in the country (Salisbury, Norwich and Old Coventry Cathedrals' are higher), and third highest of any parish church, after the Church of St Walburge, Preston, and St James' Church, Louth. It is the second highest of any Anglican parish church in the UK, after St James', and second highest in Lincolnshire, after St James'.

In 2013 an appeal was launched to save the spire.

== Stained glass ==
St Wulfram's is home to four modern stained glass windows dating to the second half of the 20th century, two designed and made by John Hayward and one each by Harry Harvey and Leonard Evetts. Harvey's 1962 window was the first to be installed, given in memory of the Caitlin family. It depicts the War in Heaven as St Michael defeats the Devil. Evetts' 1969 window, given in memory of Jessie Maria Porter, shows the Nativity of Jesus. Hayward's two windows were installed in 1970 and 1974. The first, given in memory of Minnie Hall, shows Jesus walking on water to rescue St Peter. His second, remembering Lily Pinchbeck, depicts the seven Christian sacraments.

== Music ==
The present organ by John Harris and John Byfield dates from 1735. It was rebuilt by George Pike England in 1809 and 1833, by Forster and Andrews between 1845 and 1868, by Norman and Beard in 1906 (producing the organ that may be heard today), by Rushworth and Dreaper in 1952, by Cousans of Lincoln in 1972, and by Phillip Wood and Sons of Huddersfield in 1993–94 when a fourth manual was added. The case designed by Sir Walter Tapper RA took eight years to complete. The old organ case now encloses the choir vestry in the north west corner of the church. The specification for the organ, regarded as one of the finest in Lincolnshire, can be found at the National Pipe Organ Register.

=== Organists ===
- Mr Sweet 1745–1755
- Andrew Strother 1755–1816 (jointly with Francis Sharp 1808–1816)
- Francis Sharp 1808–1832 (jointly with Andrew Strother 1808–1816)
- William Dixon 1832–1863–1865
- George Dixon 1865–1886 (previously organist of St James' Church, Louth)
- Richard Thomas Back 1886–1909–1911
- Frank Radcliffe 1911–1914 (later organist of St Mary's Church, Nottingham)
- Edward Brown 1914–1941
- Stephen John Mundy 1941–1961
- Philip Joseph Lank 1961–1983 (previously assistant organist of Peterborough Cathedral)
- Nicholas Kerrison 1984–1988
- John Ball 1988–1992
- John Wilkes 1992–1996
- Ian Major 1996–1997
- Philip Robinson 1997–2001
- Michael Sands 2002–2007
- Tim Williams 2008–

== Clock ==
The chimes were repaired and a new clock installed by Gillett and Bland of Croydon in December 1876. The costs of this work were £280 (equivalent to £28,222 in 2025). The clock was set going on 17 February 1877.

On 5 November 1877 the new clock was inspected by Sir Edmund Beckett, who assessed that it was one of the best turned out by Gillett and Bland.

== Gallery ==
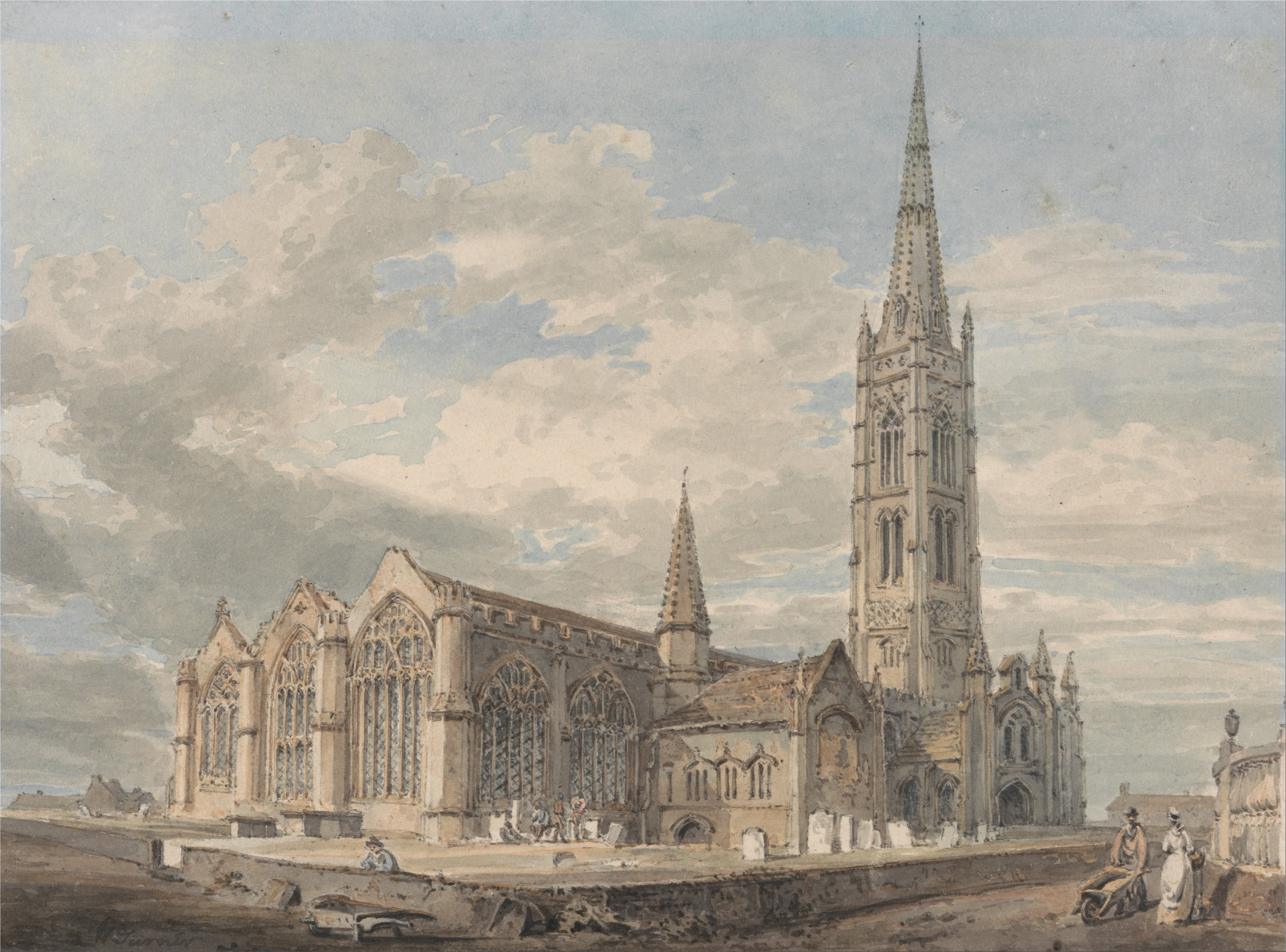
The church painted by J. M. W. Turner, c. 1797

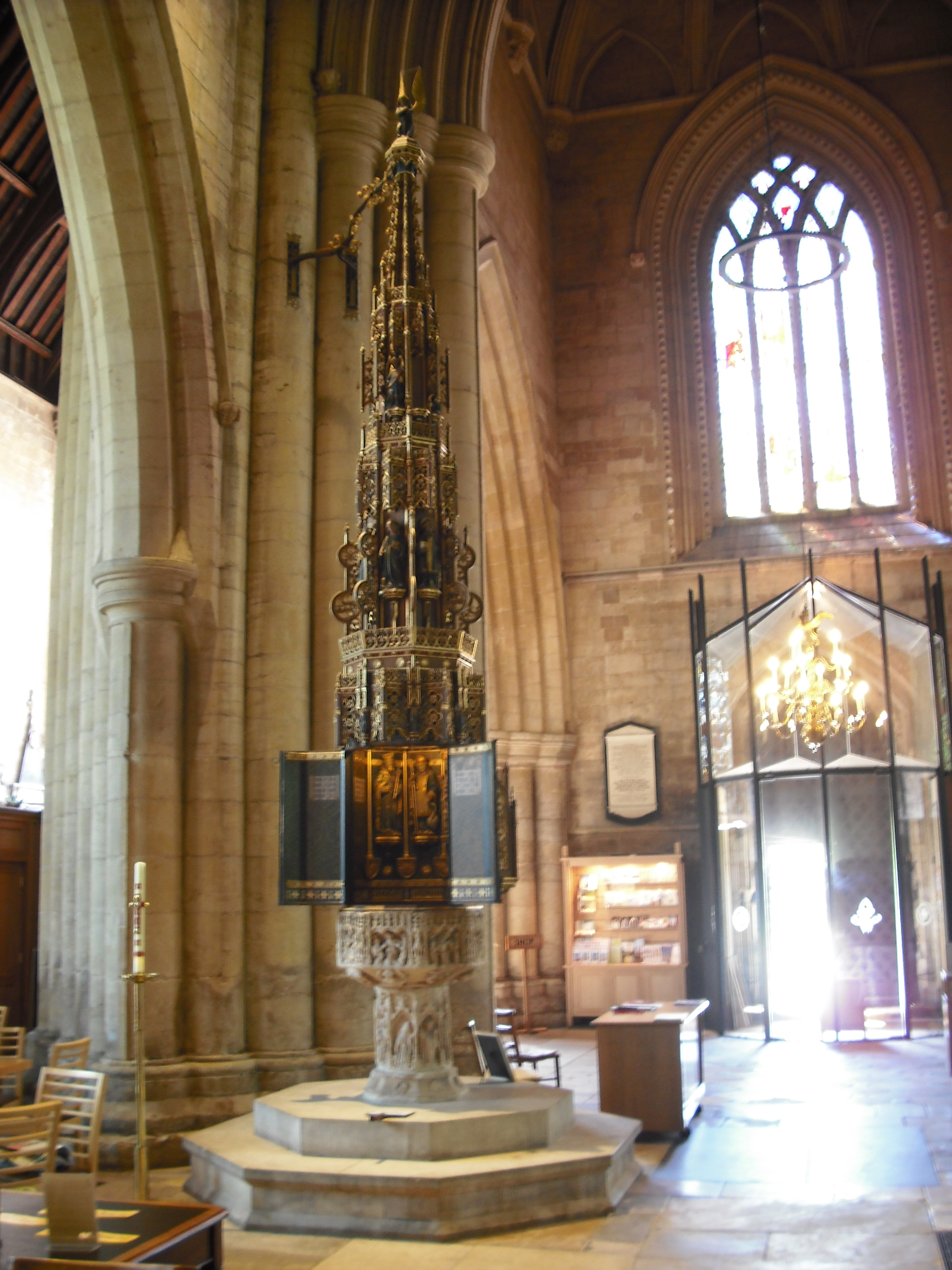
The font, with cover by Sir Walter Tapper

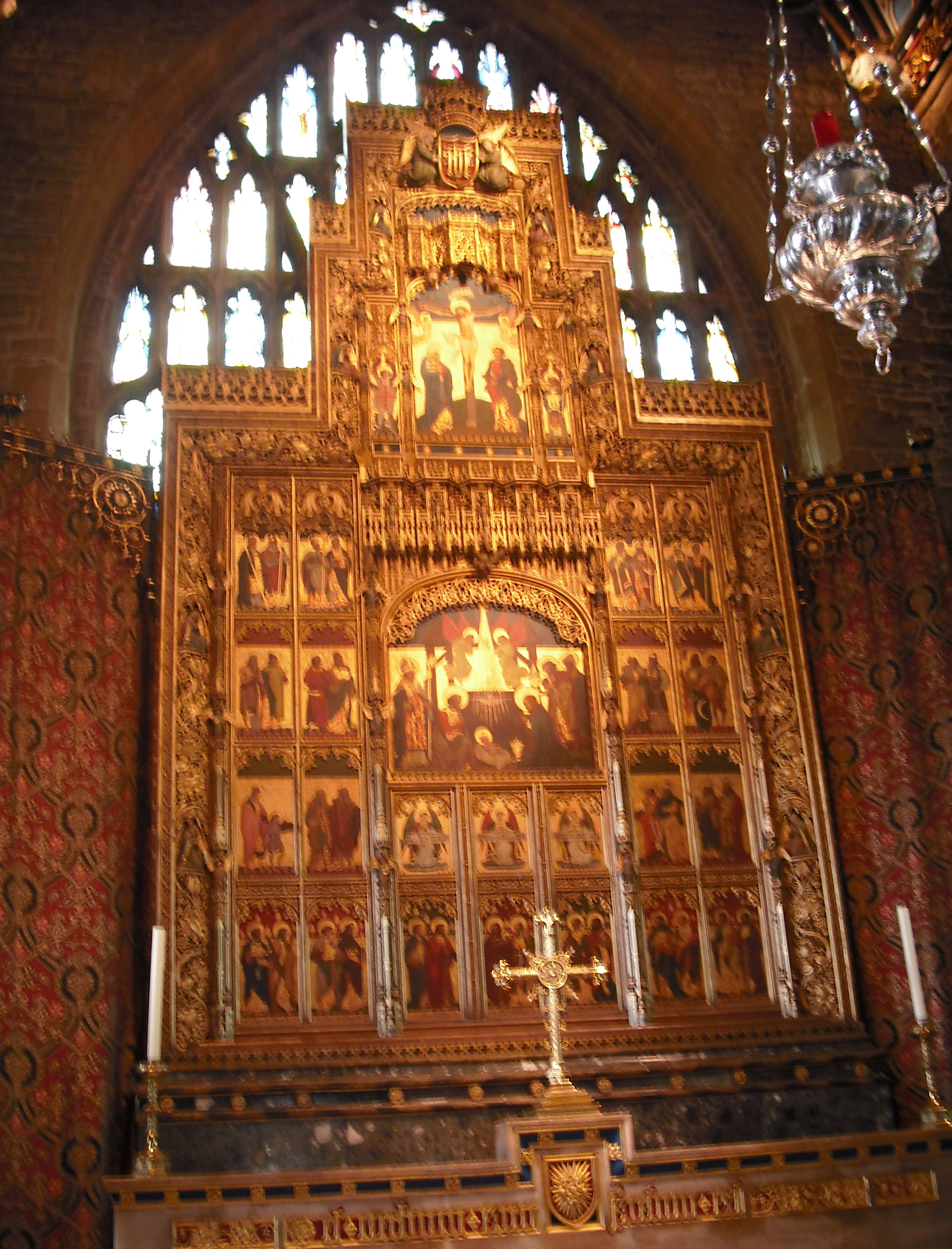
Reredos

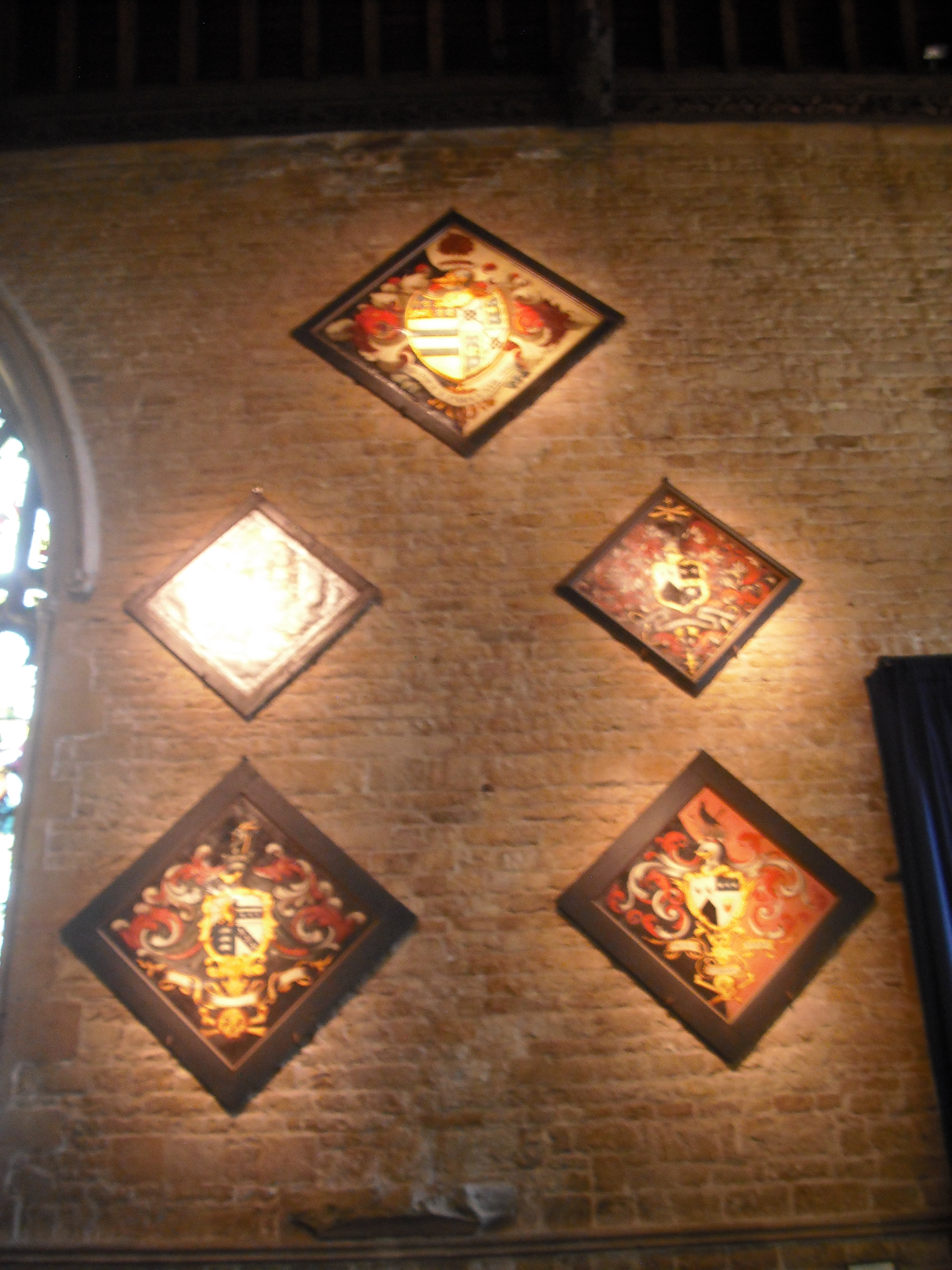
Five hatchments on the south wall

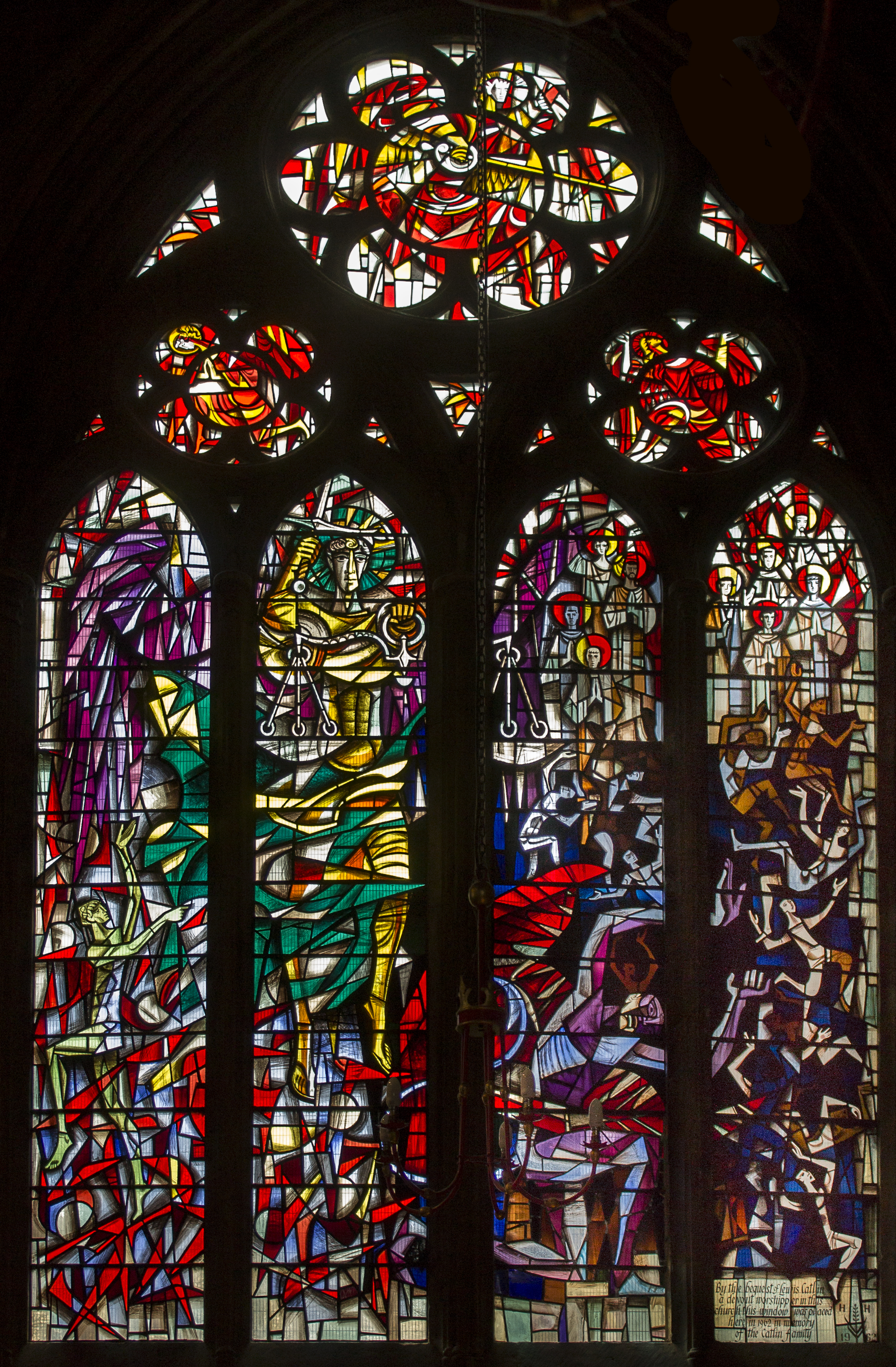
Window by Harry Harvey - War in Heaven (1962)

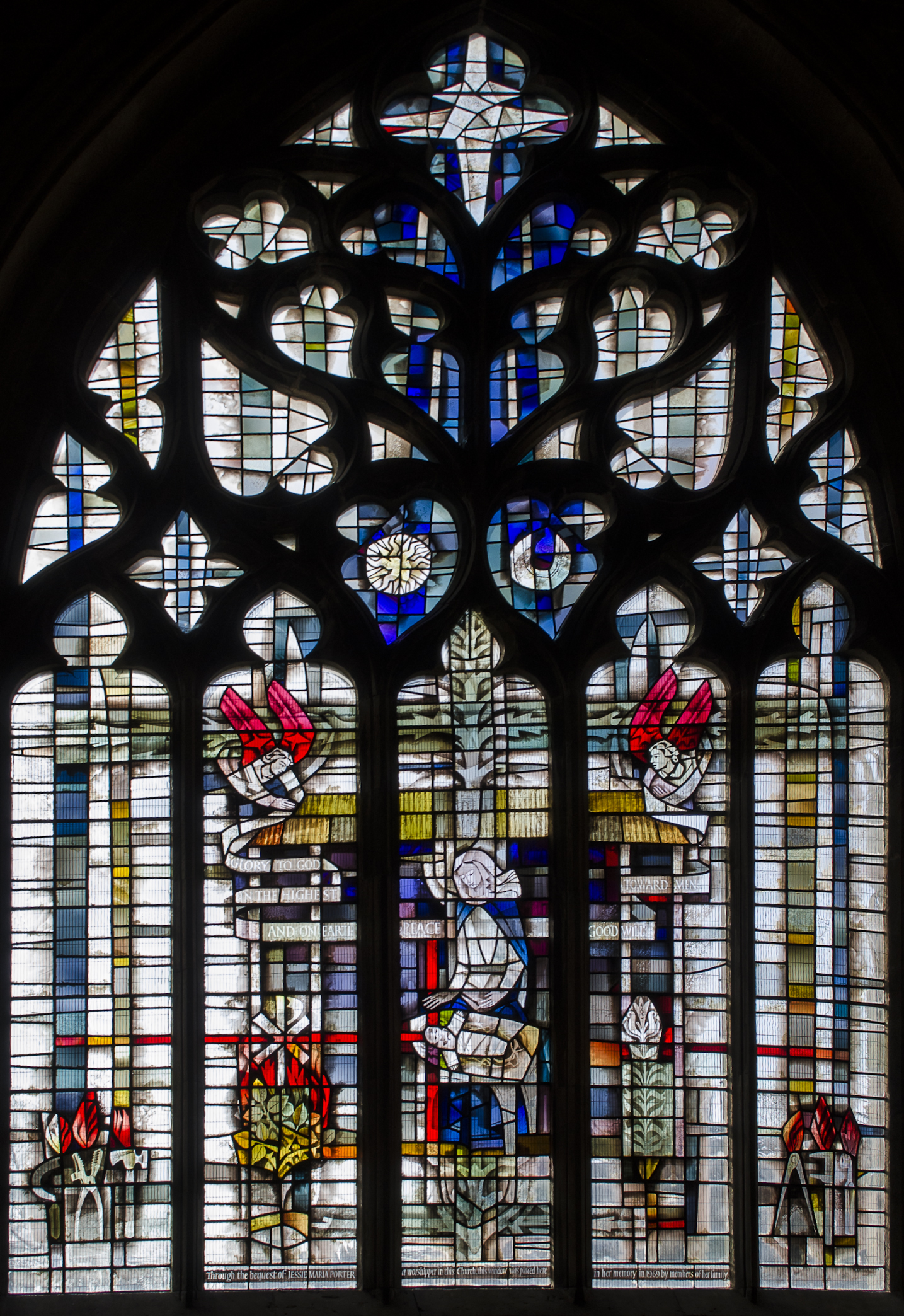
Window by Leonard Evetts - Nativity of Jesus (1969)

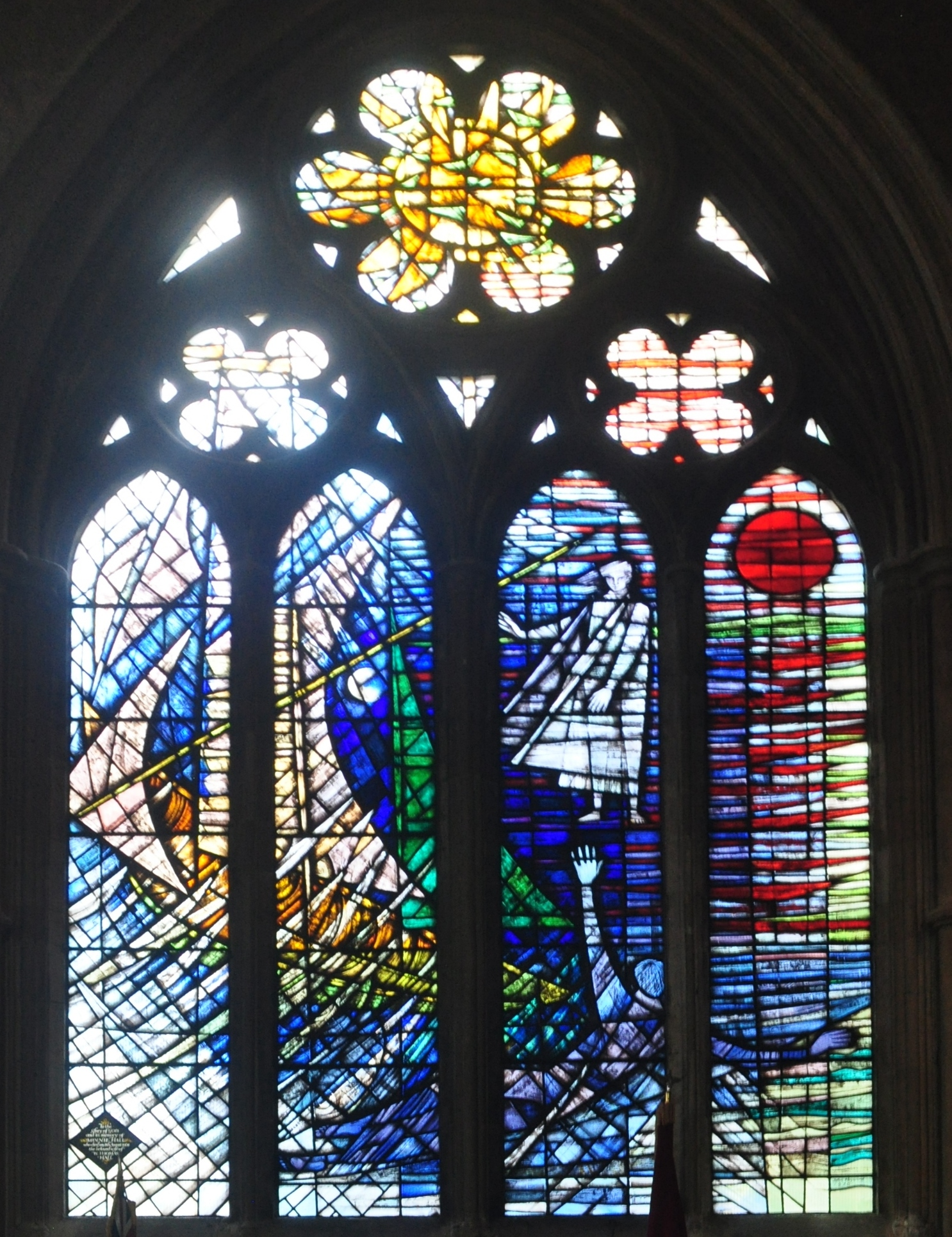
Window by John Hayward - Christ walking on Water (1970)

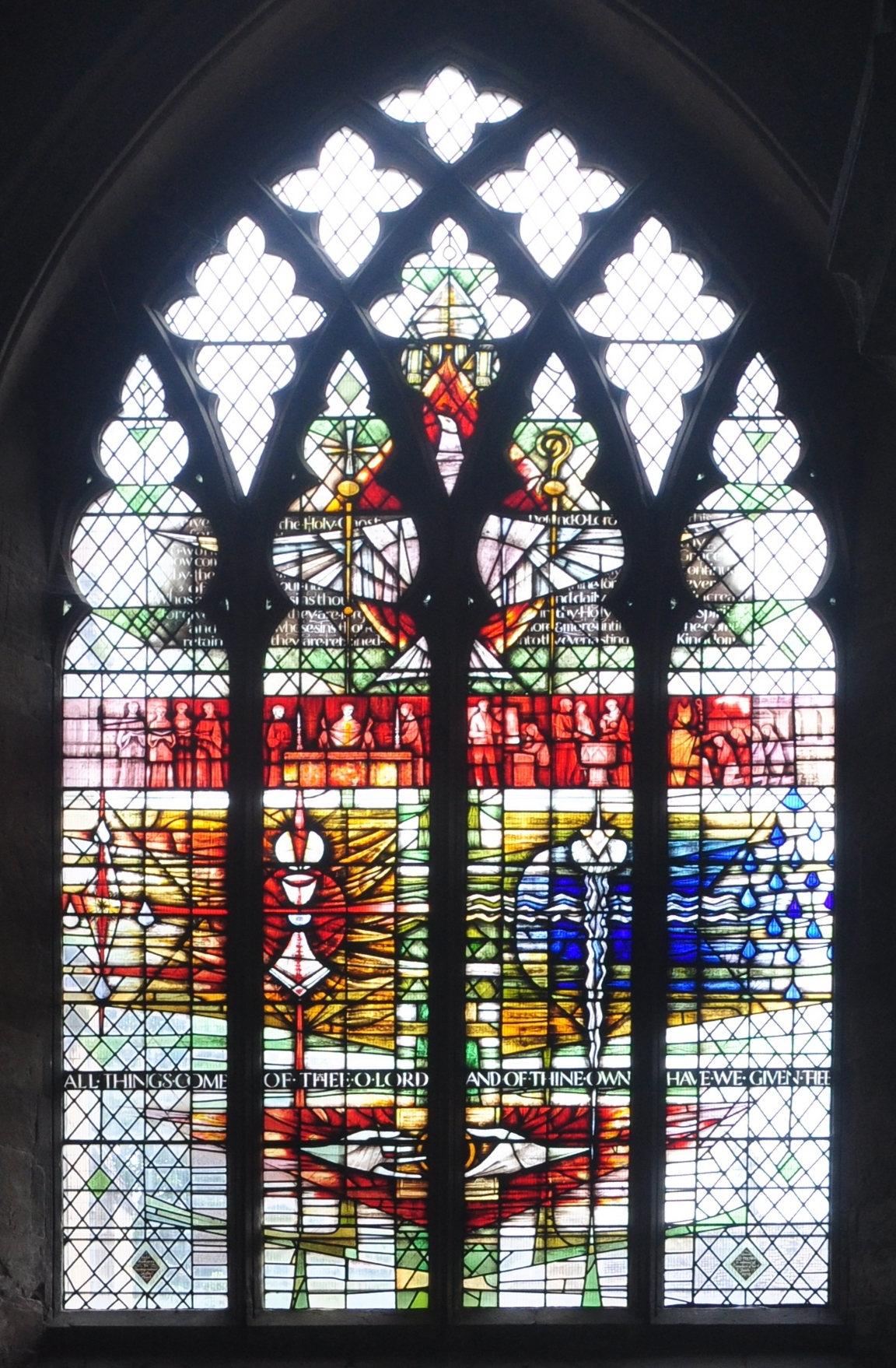
Window by John Hayward - The Seven Sacraments (1974)

== See also ==
- Bishop of Grantham

== Sources ==
- Jenkins, Simon (1999), England's Thousand Best Churches, London, Pengin Books, ISBN 978-0-14-103930-5
- Pevsner, Nikolaus; Harris, John; The Buildings of England: Lincolnshire, Penguin (1964), revised by Nicholas Antram (1989), Yale University Press. ISBN 0300096208
