= Moseley School of Art =

Art school in Birmingham, England

Coordinates: 52°27′26.20″N 1°53′7.66″W

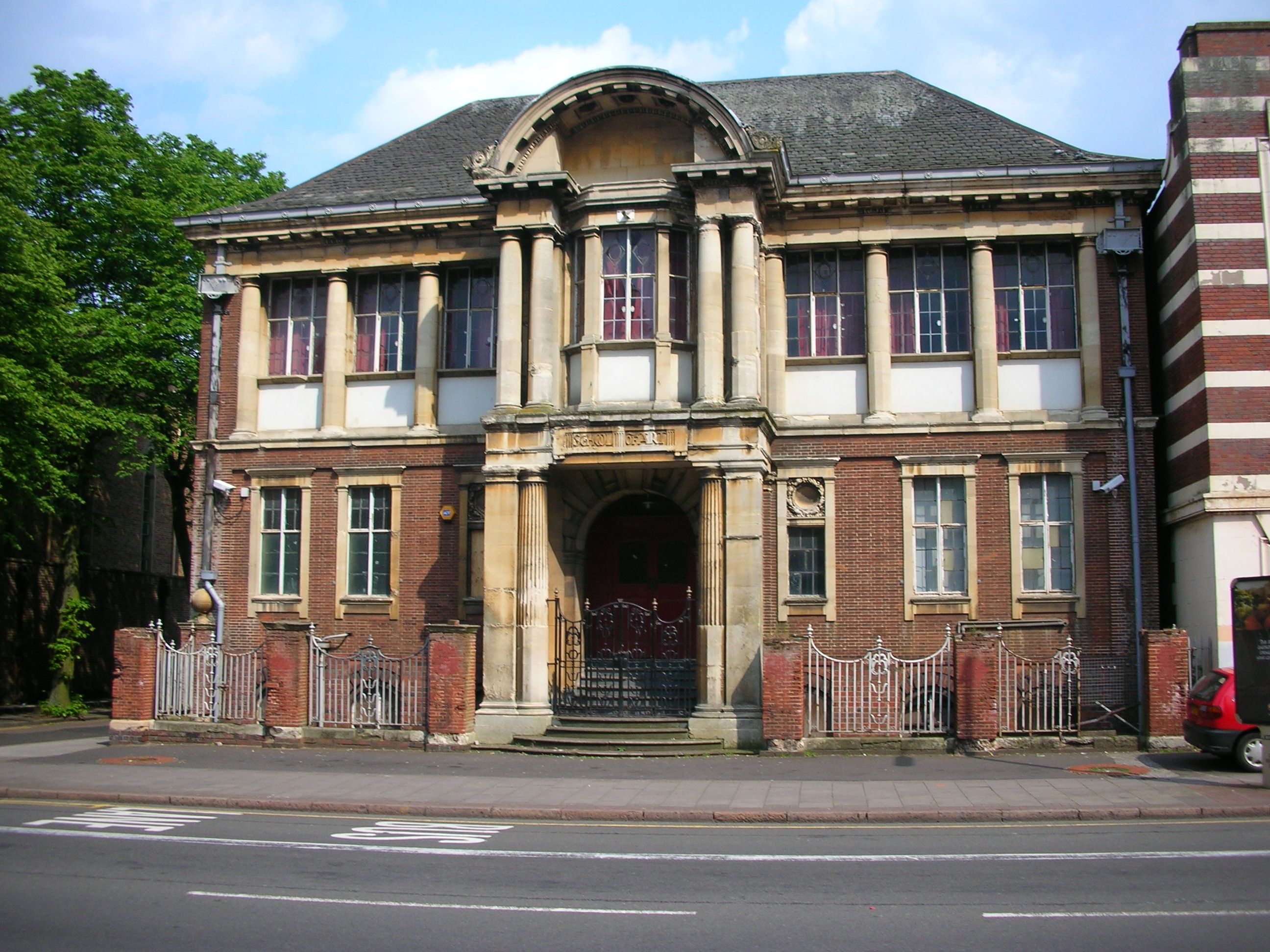
Moseley School of Art

The Moseley School of Art (grid reference SP078843) on Moseley Road, Balsall Heath, Birmingham, England was built as the first municipal branch School of Art in Birmingham.

The Moseley School of Art was closed by the City of Birmingham Education Committee in 1976. The Moseley School of Art Association was established in 2002 by former student Graeme Collins as a forum and reunion association for past students and teaching staff.

It was designed by W. H. Bidlake in 1899 and opened in 1900. It closed in 1975 and was then used by the British Association of Muslims. It stands directly opposite the Public Library and Baths. It is Grade II* listed.

== Notable alumni ==
- Edward Barker, cartoonist
- Trevor Beattie, advertising
- Ali Campbell, musician, former lead singer of UB40
- Harry Harvey, stained glass artist
- Christine McVie, musician from Fleetwood Mac
- Ronald Pennell, artist, engraver and sculptor
- Peter Phillips, artist and co-founder of the Pop Art Movement
- David Prentice, artist (painter) and art teacher
- Brian Travers, saxophonist from UB40
- John Walker, painter and printmaker
- Roy Wood, musician known for his work with the bands The Move, Electric Light Orchestra, and Wizzard

== Sources ==
- Victorian Architecture in Britain - Blue Guide, Julian Orbach, 1987, ISBN 0-393-30070-6
- Britain in Old Photographs: Balsall Heath and Highgate, Past and Present, Alan Hemming & Val Hart, 2003, ISBN 0-7509-2917-0
- Historic England. "Details from listed building database (1343102)". National Heritage List for England.
- Heritage at Risk Register: Former+School+Art
