= Henry Harvey (disambiguation) =

Henry Harvey (1743–1810) was a British Royal Navy officer.

Henry Harvey may also refer to:

- Henry Harvey, builder of the Barnsley Mechanics Institute and Public Hall, now The Civic, Barnsley, in 1877
- Henry Harvey (1812-1887), son of Thomas Harvey (Royal Navy officer)
- Henry Harvey (assemblyman) in 58th New York State Legislature
- Henry Harvey (astronomer) on List of Fellows of the Royal Society G, H, I
- Henry Harvey (lawyer) (died 1585), English lawyer
- Henry Stephen Harvey (1889–?), American architect

== See also ==
- Harry Harvey (disambiguation)
- Henry Hervey (disambiguation), pronounced Harvey
