= Harold Harvey =

Harold Harvey may refer to:

- Herk Harvey (Harold Arnold Harvey, 1924–1996), American film director, actor, and film producer
- Doug Harvey (umpire) (Harold Douglas Harvey, 1930–2018), Major League Baseball umpire
- Harold Harvey (artist) (1874–1941), Newlyn School painter

== See also ==
- Harry Harvey (disambiguation)
