= Harry Harvey (artist) =

British stained glass artist (1922–2011)

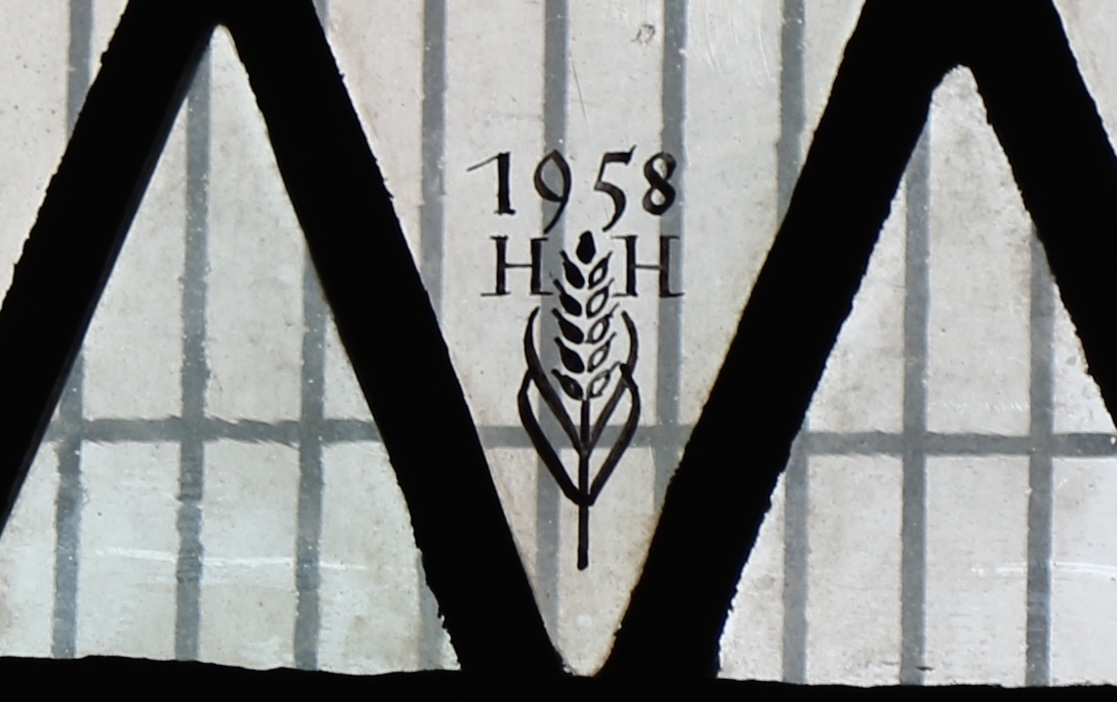
- Harry Harvey's maker's mark
- Born: Harry William Harvey; 22 November 1922; Birmingham, United Kingdom
- Died: 29 January 2011 (aged 88); York, United Kingdom
- Education: Moseley School of Art
- Known for: Stained glass
- Style: Figurative modernism
- Movement: York School of Glass Painting
- Elected: Fellow of the British Society of Master Glass Painters

Harry Harvey (22 November 1922 – 29 January 2011) was a British stained glass artist and master glass painter known for his extensive ecclesiastical and civic work across Yorkshire and other parts of the United Kingdom. Over the course of his career, Harvey produced more than 200 stained glass windows, including works for the Anglican cathedrals of Carlisle, Ripon and Sheffield, and the York Guildhall. He is closely associated with the revival of the York School of Glass Painting in the mid-20th century.

== Early life and training ==
Harry William Harvey was born on 22 November 1922 in Birmingham, England. As a youth he attended the Moseley School of Art where he showed an early aptitude for drawing. In 1938, aged 15, Harvey secured a three‑year apprenticeship in the stained glass studio of the firm Pearce & Cutler Ltd, which was based on Broad Street in Birmingham.

While Harvey's apprenticeship with Pearce & Cutler exposed him to the fundamental principles of glassmaking, his early career was interrupted by the onset of the Second World War. Enlisted into the Royal Navy aged 18, Harvey served as a signalman on the destroyer HMS Windsor.

== Early career ==
Soon after the end of the War, Harvey moved to Devon in order to take up an appointment with the church furnishing firm J. Whippell & Co. of Exeter. Here he met Harry Stammers, 20 years his senior and an experienced stained glass draftsman, who had himself recently transferred from the London firm of Powell & Sons.

The relationship Harvey formed with Stammers would prove to be pivotal to his future career. Stammers, soon left Whippell's in order to establish his own independent glassmaking studio. In 1947, he was invited by Eric Milner-White, Dean of York Minster, to help revive the York School of Glass Painting by relocating his studio to the city. Stammers accepted the appointment and invited Harvey to join him in York as his assistant.

Harvey would remain with Stammers for nine years, a commercially productive period for the stained glass industry given the large number of commissions available for the replacement of stained glass lost due to wartime bomb damage. During Harvey's time as assistant, the studio won commissions for windows at the cathedrals of Salisbury, Lichfield, Hereford, Lincoln and Glasgow, as well as many parish churches. At York Minister, Harvey was responsible for painting the astronomical clock given in 1955 to commemorate the airmen stationed in Yorkshire who had been killed in the Second World War, the design for which he worked on with Stammers.

== Independent studio ==
In 1956, with the blessing of Stammers, Harvey established his own stained glass studio in Acomb, North Yorkshire. He chose as his rebus a wheatsheaf with the initials HH to either side. Over the following three decades, Harvey would win commissions for windows in more than 70 churches in Yorkshire and 60 more across England and Wales. As he had been assistant to Stammers, Harvey likewise appointed his own; Sep Waugh from 1957 to 1967 and Ann Sotheran from 1982 to 1987, both of whom would later establish their own glass studios.

Among Harvey's early commissions were two windows for the Church of St Martin in the Bull Ring in his home city of Birmingham, installed in the east walls of the north and south chapels either side of the chancel. In the north chapel is a Crucifixion scene from 1956, and in the south chapel an Adoration scene, installed in 1958.

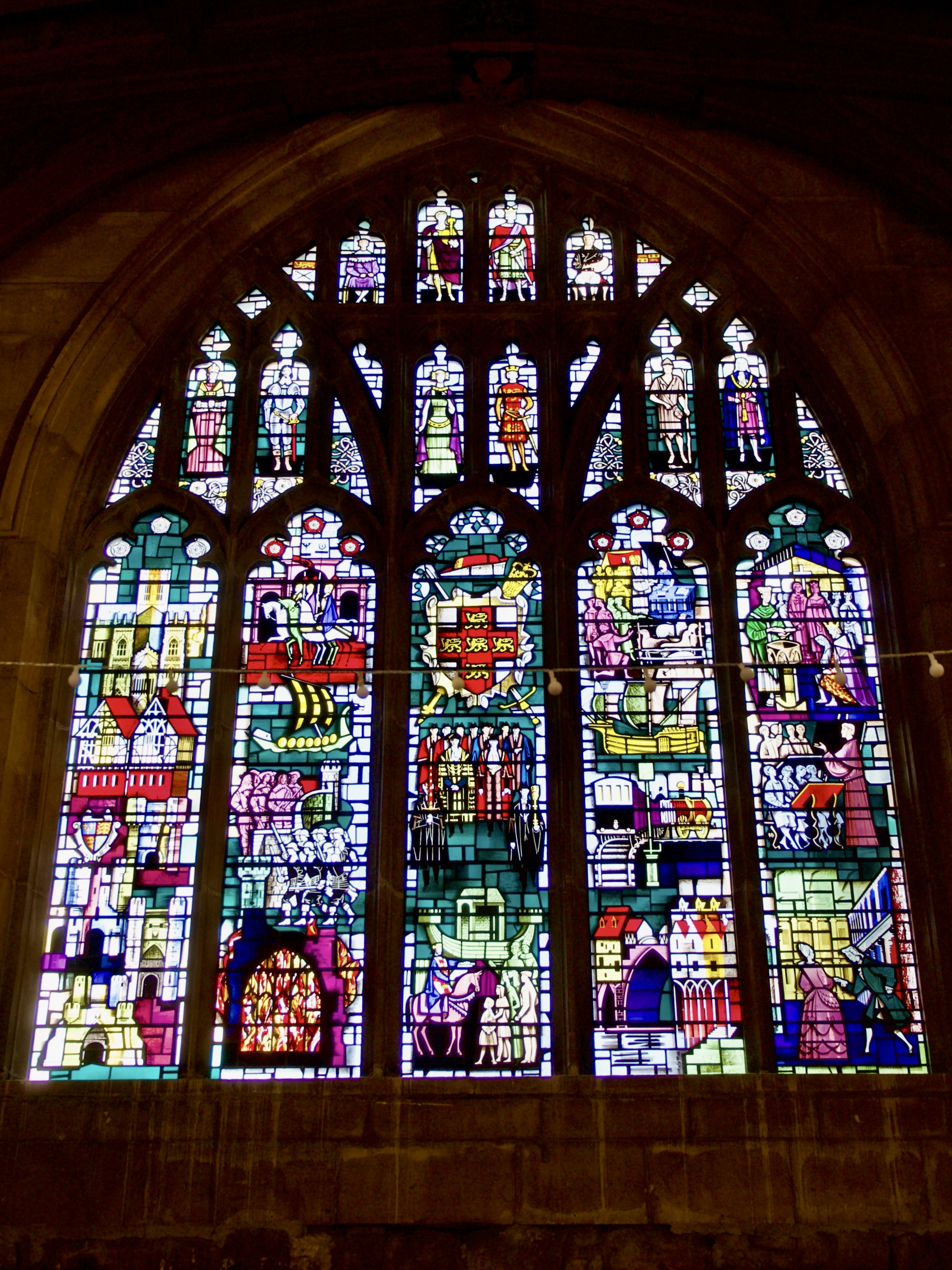
York Guildhall - History and Heritage of the City of York (1960)

Harvey's 1960 window for the main hall of York Guildhall is among his most well-known. The medieval building was badly damaged during the York Blitz, when all of its windows were blown out, including the large five-light window in the north-east wall that had been glazed in 1682 by Henry Gyles. Harvey's replacement window individually celebrates an aspect of the city's heritage across each of its five lights; architecture, the armed forces, civic life, commerce, and religious instruction. It includes a depiction of the Guildhall aflame in 1942. In the tracery above are representations of worthy historical figures associated with York, including John Thornton, who glazed the Great East Window of York Minster between 1405 and 1408.

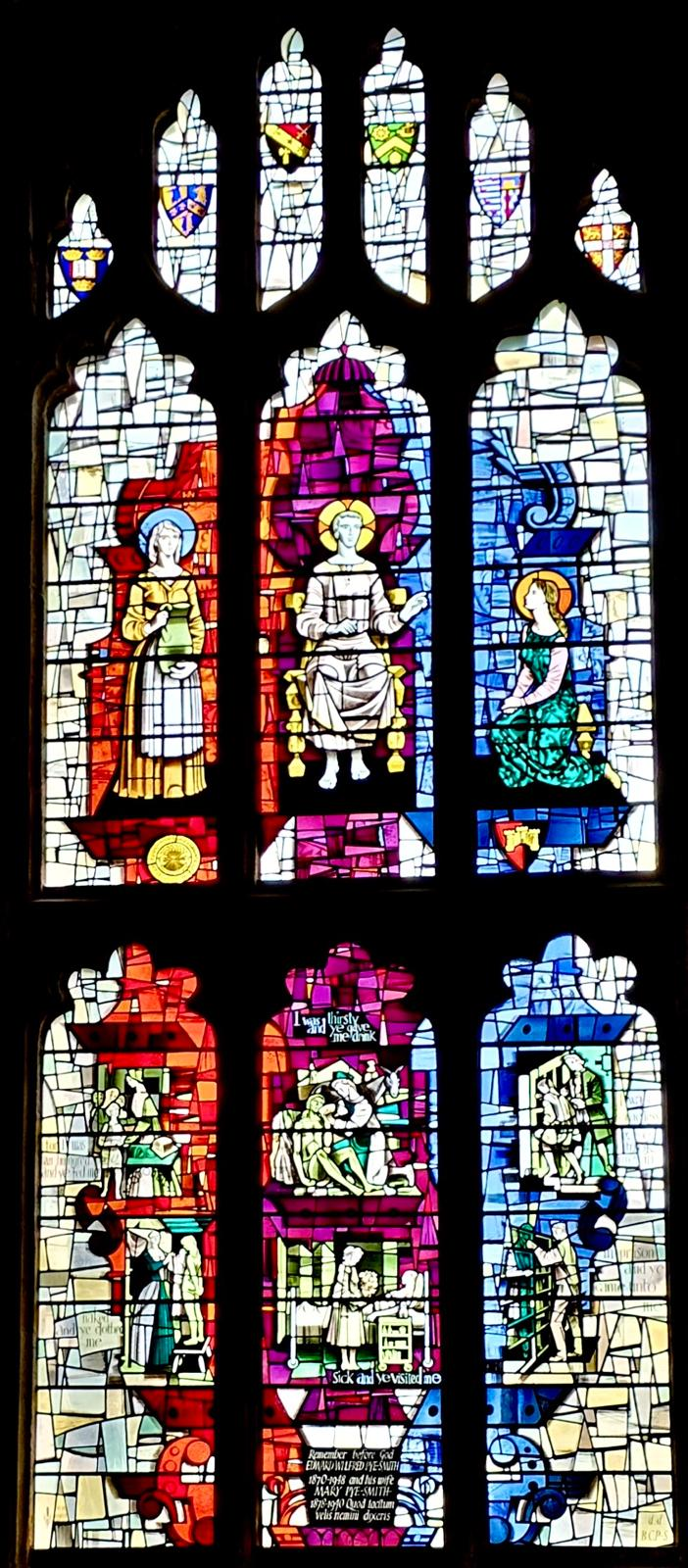
Sheffield Cathedral - Corporal works of mercy (1967)

Harvey's 1967 window for Sheffield Cathedral was installed in the north wall of St Katherine's Chapel in memory of Edward and Mary Pye-Smith. The upper lights depict Jesus in the House of Mary and Martha, set against an abstract background of red, purple and blue. In the lower three lights are depictions of six of the corporal works of mercy - to feed the hungry, give water to the thirsty, clothe the naked, shelter the homeless, and to visit the sick and imprisoned. Each work is shown as an individual scene with descriptive text taken from the Gospel of Matthew.

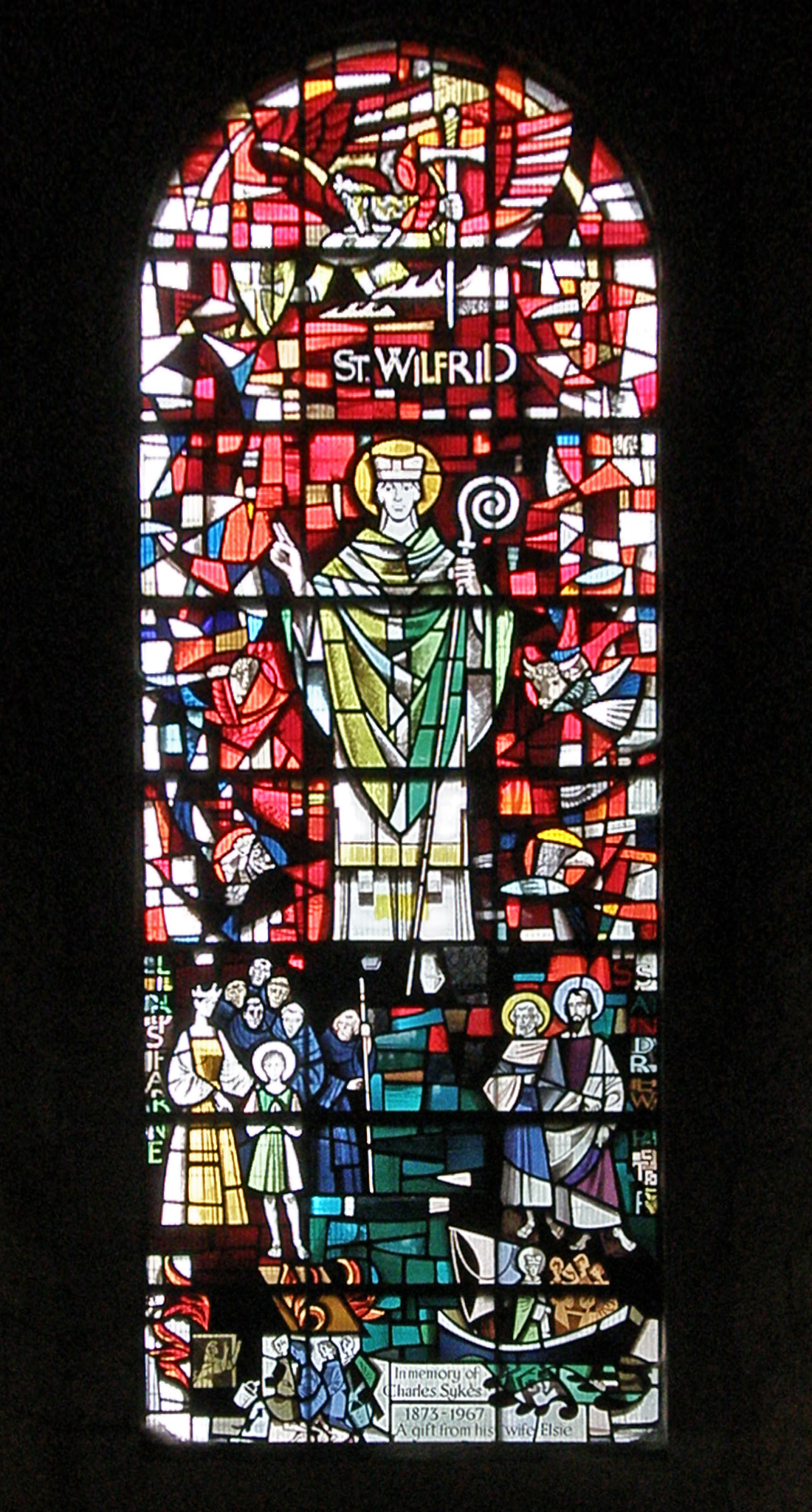
Ripon Cathedral - St Wilfrid (1977)

At Ripon Cathedral, Harvey created the Saint Wilfrid window for the north east transept, which was dedicated in 1977 in memory of Charles Sykes. Wilfrid, the founder of Ripon Cathedral, is seen standing to the centre of the window against an abstract background predominantly in red, his right hand raised in blessing. Around him are depicted the symbols of the Four Evangelists, while in the bottom section are a multitude of figures including Wilfrid as a child at Lindisfarne and the saints Peter and Andrew. Writing in Harvey's signature typography identifies the primary characters.

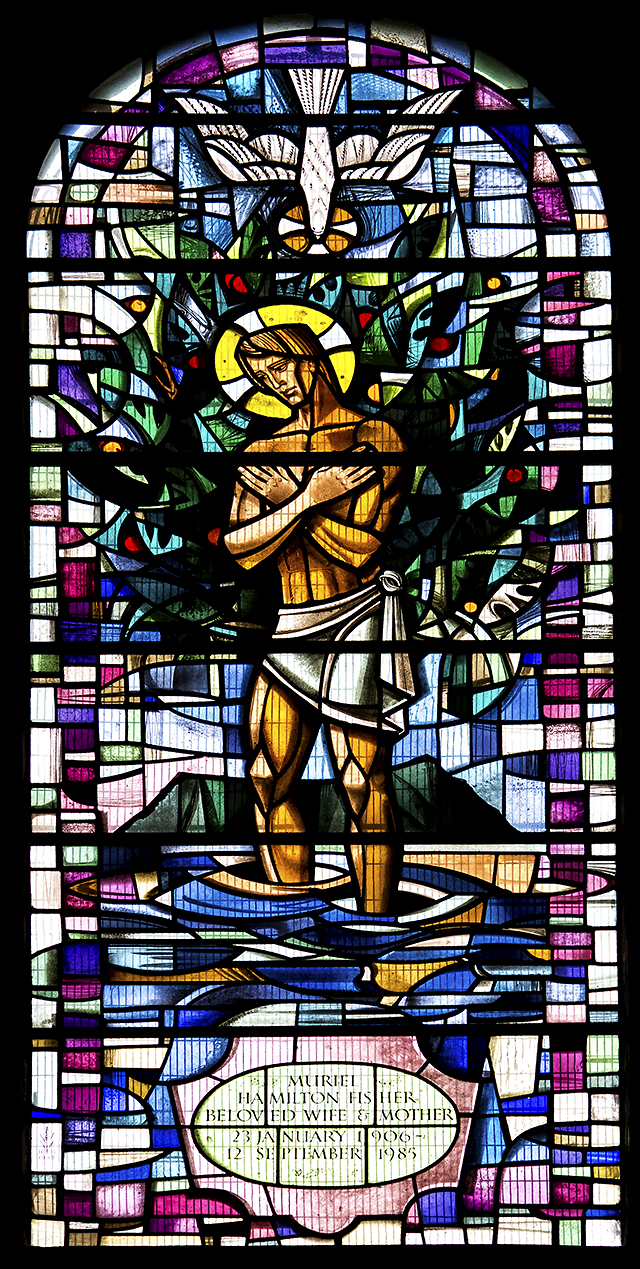
Carlisle Cathedral - Baptism of Christ (1987)

For Carlisle Cathedral Harvey designed the memorial window to Muriel Hamilton Fisher in the north aisle of the nave, which was dedicated in 1987. It depicts Jesus being bapitised in the River Jordan against an abstract background typical of Harvey's work. It was one of the final commissions to be completed at his studio.

Like Stammers, Harvey’s professional opportunities were bolstered by his association with the architect George Pace, who was responsible for the reconstruction of a number of churches in the decades following the Second World War. Pace employed Harvey for stained glass commissions, heraldic design and decorative text. Commissions that Harvey secured through this association include his 1963 Christ in Majesty window for the Church of St David in Maesmynis, Powys.

Harvey was elected a Fellow of the British Society of Master Glass Painters in 1962.

== Later life and death ==
Harvey closed his studio in 1987, though he did not completely retire. He established a professional relationship with the glass restorer and conservator Keith Barley at the Barley Studio he had established in York in 1973. Among Harvey's collaborations with Barley was the conservation of the late-Medieval windows preserved at St Mary's Church, Fairford - said to be the most complete set of pre-Reformation stained glass remaining in the UK. Although Harvey would only work with Barley until 1992, the 25-year restoration at Fairford was not completed until 2010.

Harvey continued to live in the York area following his retirement, latterly in Wigginton, North Yorkshire. He died on 29 January 2011, aged 88. His obituary was published in the The Daily Telegraph on 9 February that year.

== Style ==
Harvey’s stained glass exemplifies the specifically British take on mid-century modernism that became the hallmark of the York School of Glass Painting. This combined traditional iconography with the expressive colour, angular forms and narrative directness that is often associated with the Festival of Britain style. It was an approach that found favour with both the public and institutional patrons. Stylistically, Harvey worked in dialogue with his mentor Harry Stammers and contemporaries such as Leonard Evetts, John Hayward, W. T. Carter Shapland and Brian Thomas, who similarly fused modern compositional sensibilities with figurative iconography.

== Selected works ==
- Church of St Martin in the Bull Ring, Birmingham
  - North chapel, Crucifixion (1956)
  - South chapel, Adoration (1958)
- York Guildhall
  - North-east wall, York history and heritage (1960)
- Church of the Holy Trinity, Christchurch, Newport
  - Lady chapel, Adoration of the Magi and Shepherds (1961)
- Church of St Wulfram, Grantham
  - North aisle, St Michael Triumphs over the Devil (1962)
- Church of St David, Maesmynis, Powys
  - East window, Christ in Majesty (1963)
- Church of St Mary and St Nicholas, Spalding
  - South aisle, God provides for his people (1966)
  - South aisle, Infancy of Christ (1966)
- Sheffield Cathedral
  - St Katherine's Chapel, Corporal works of mercy (1967)
- Ripon Cathedral
  - North east transept, St Wilfrid (1977)
- Christ Church, Shooters Hill, London
  - South aisle, Jesus in the workshop of Joseph (1978)
- Mansion House, Doncaster
  - Small salon, International Year of Peace (1986)
- Carlisle Cathedral
  - North aisle, Baptism of Christ (1987)

== Gallery ==
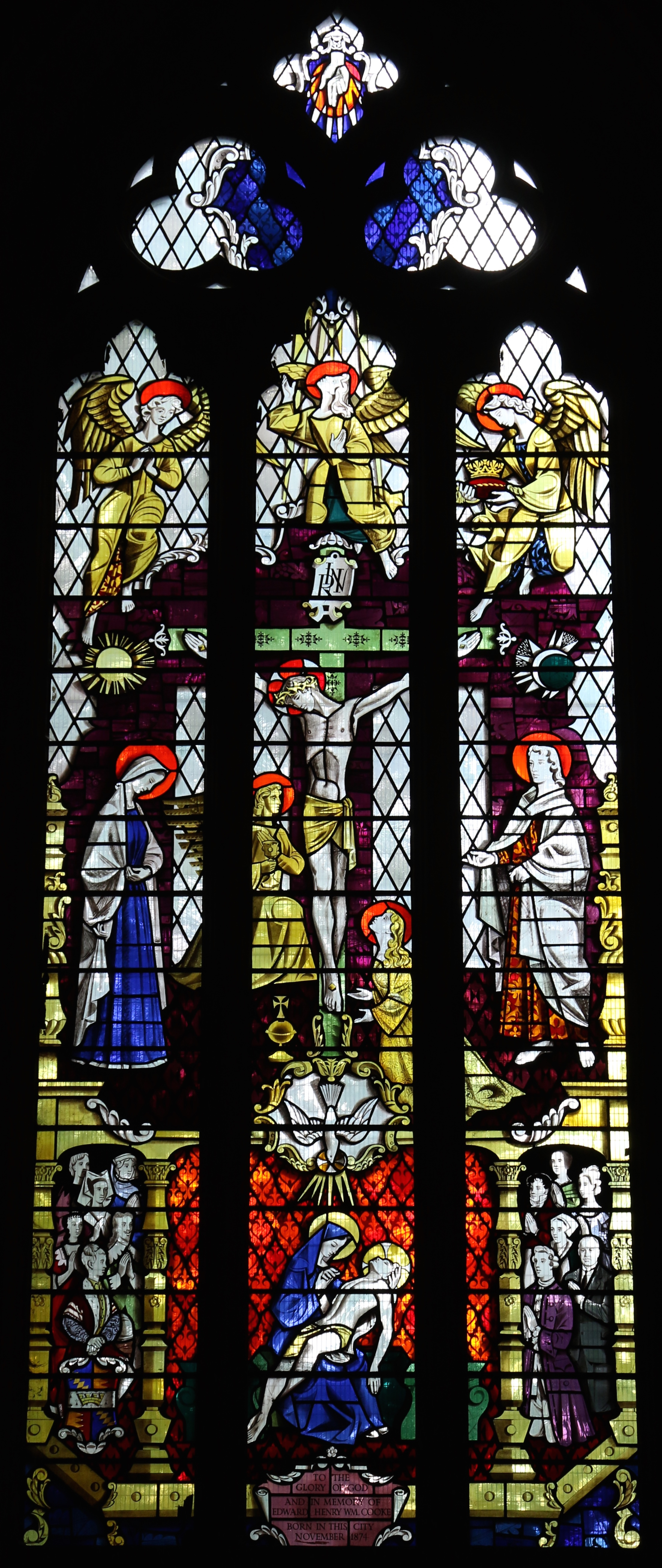
St Martin in the Bull Ring, Birmingham - Crucifixion (1956)

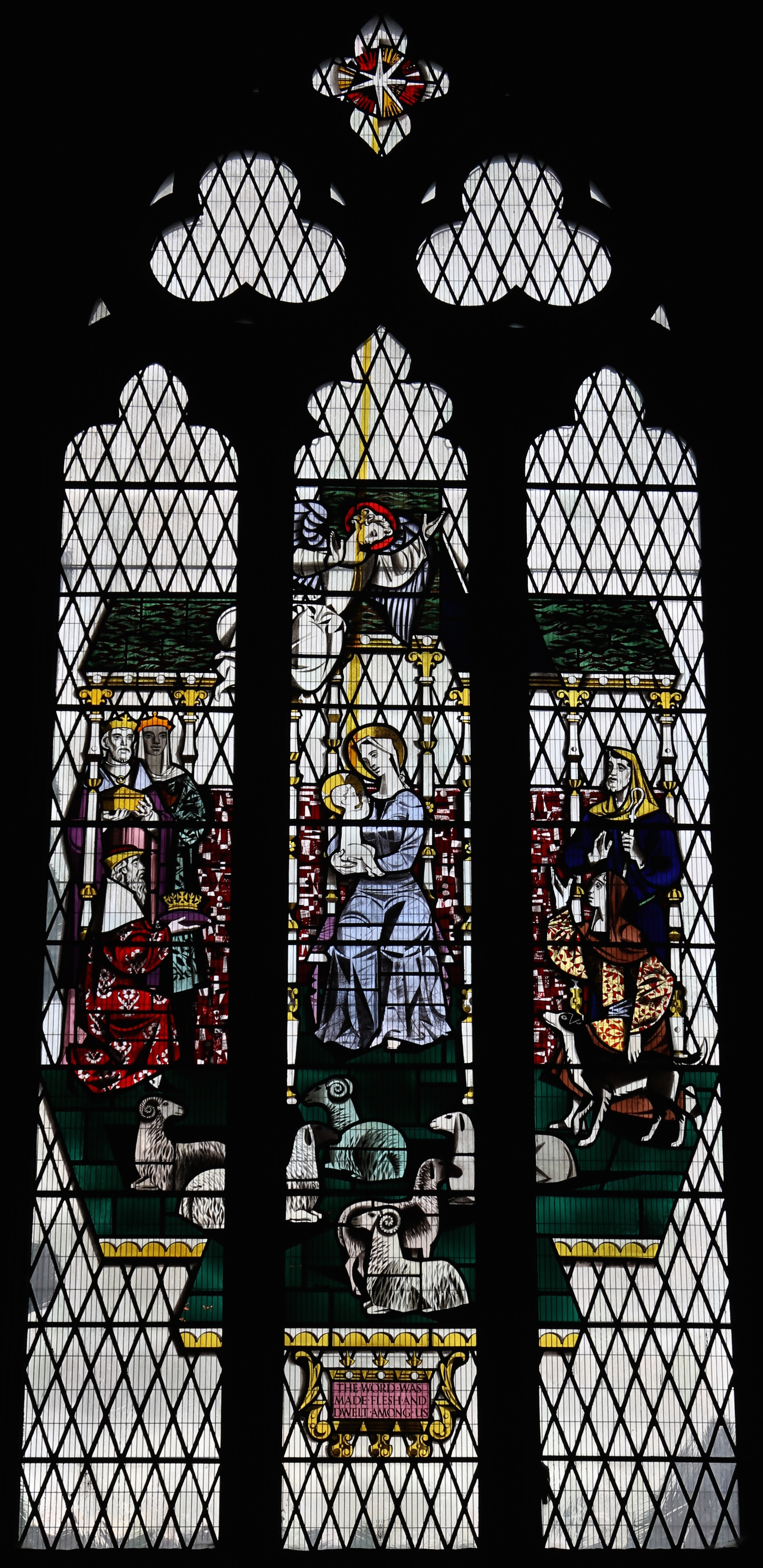
St Martin in the Bull Ring, Birmingham - Adoration (1958)

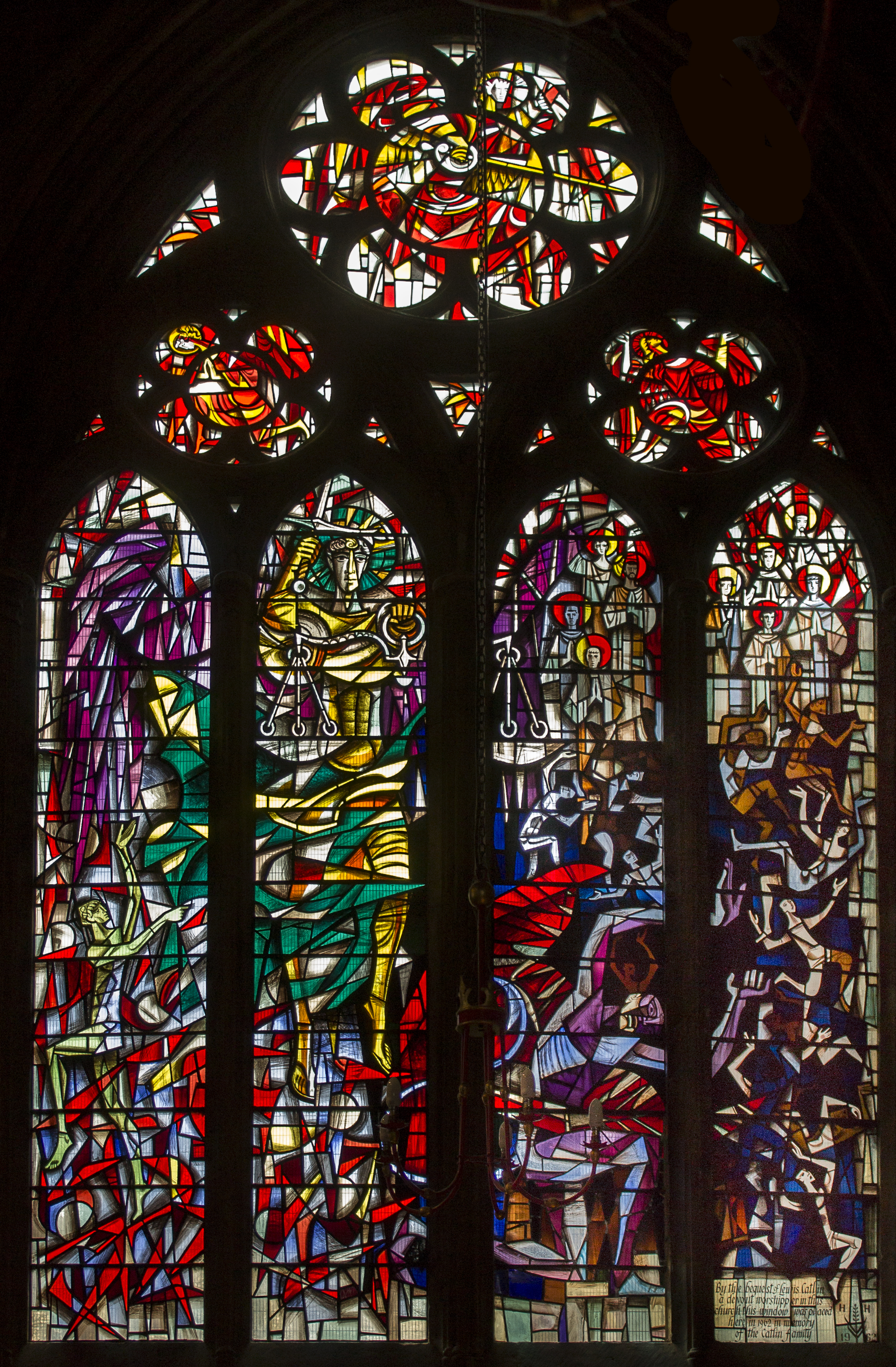
St Wulfram, Grantham - St Michael Triumphs over the Devil (1962)

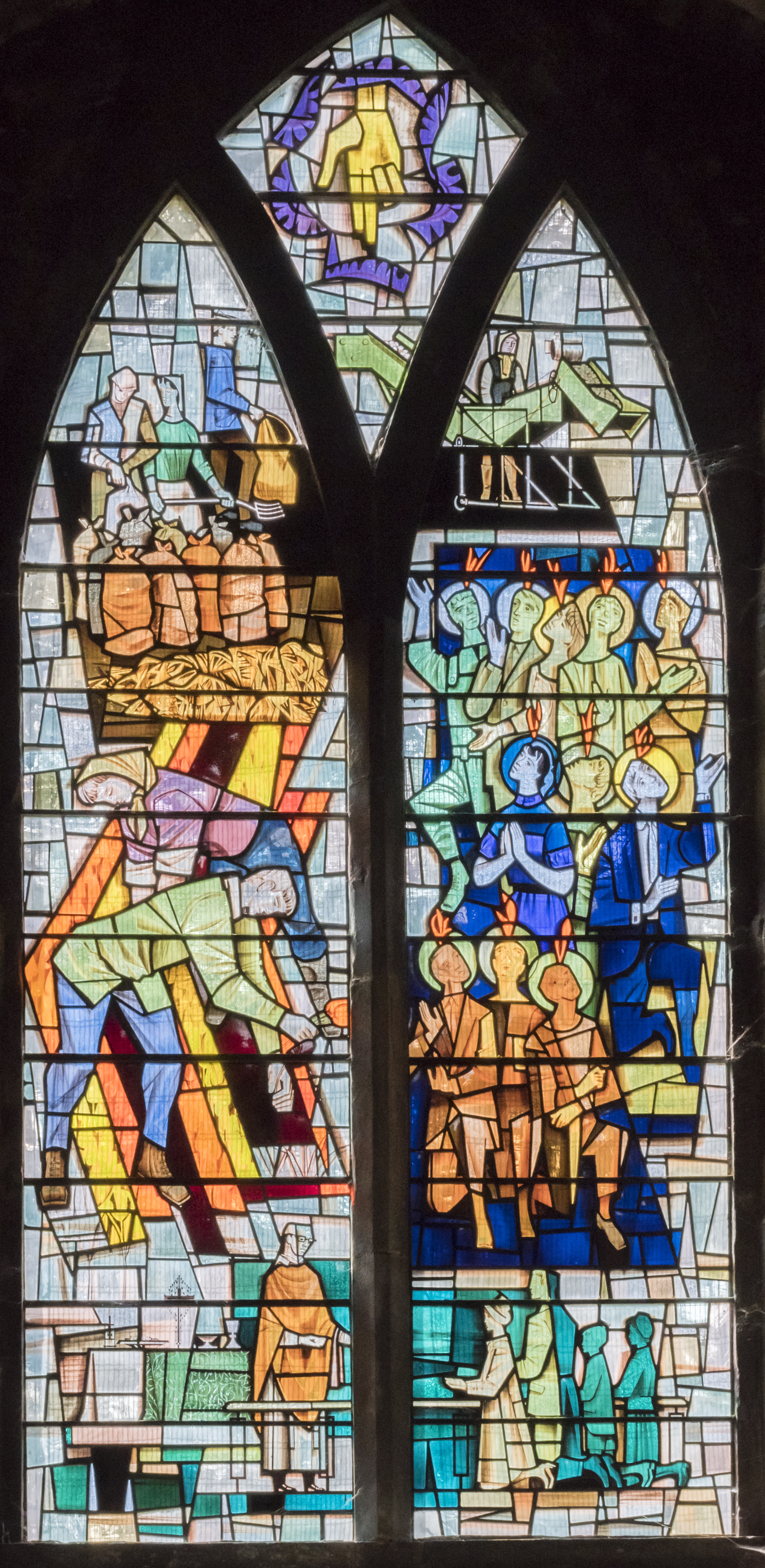
St Mary and St Nicholas, Spalding - God Provides for his People (1966)

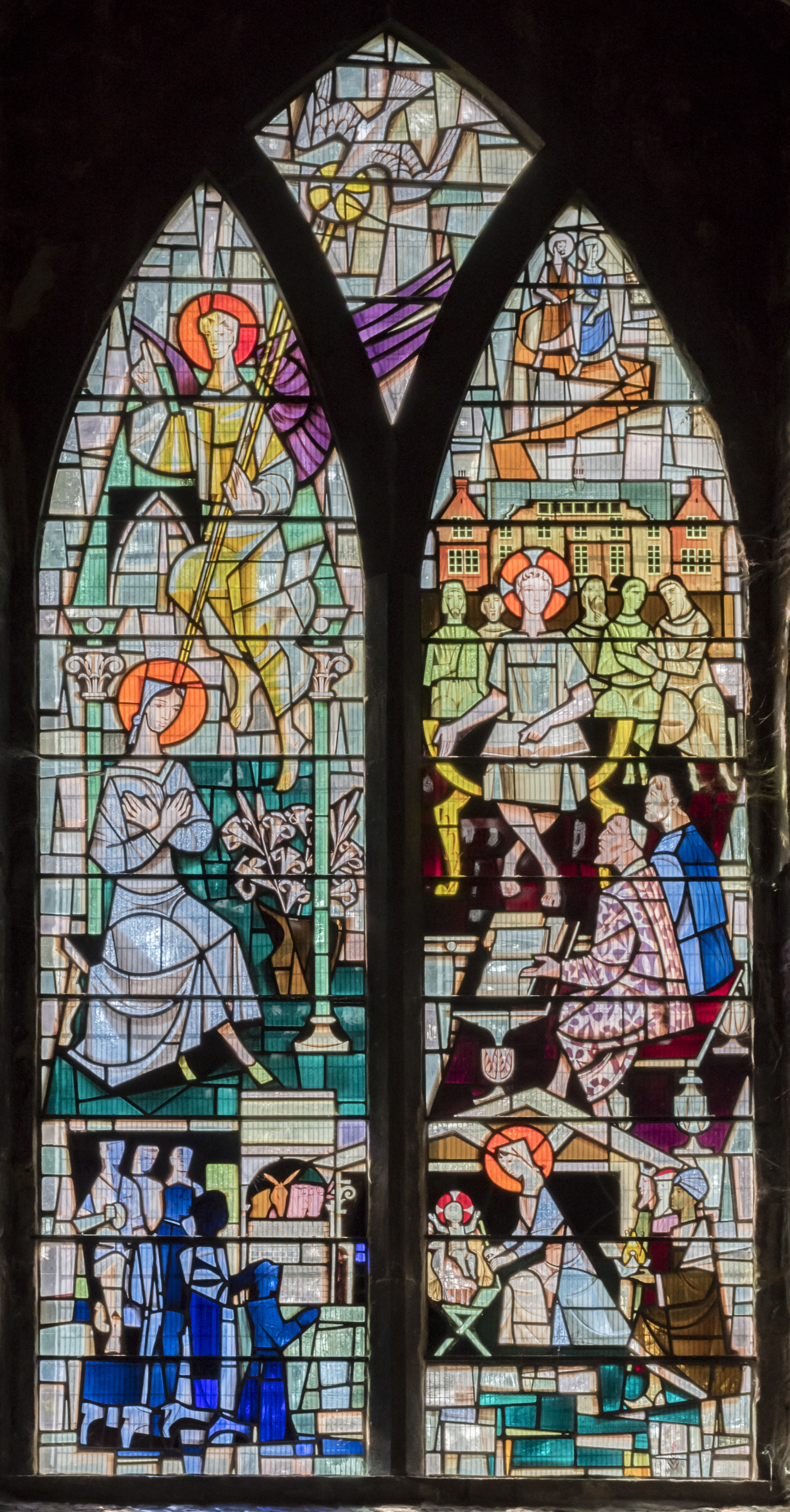
St Mary and St Nicholas, Spalding - Infancy of Christ (1966)

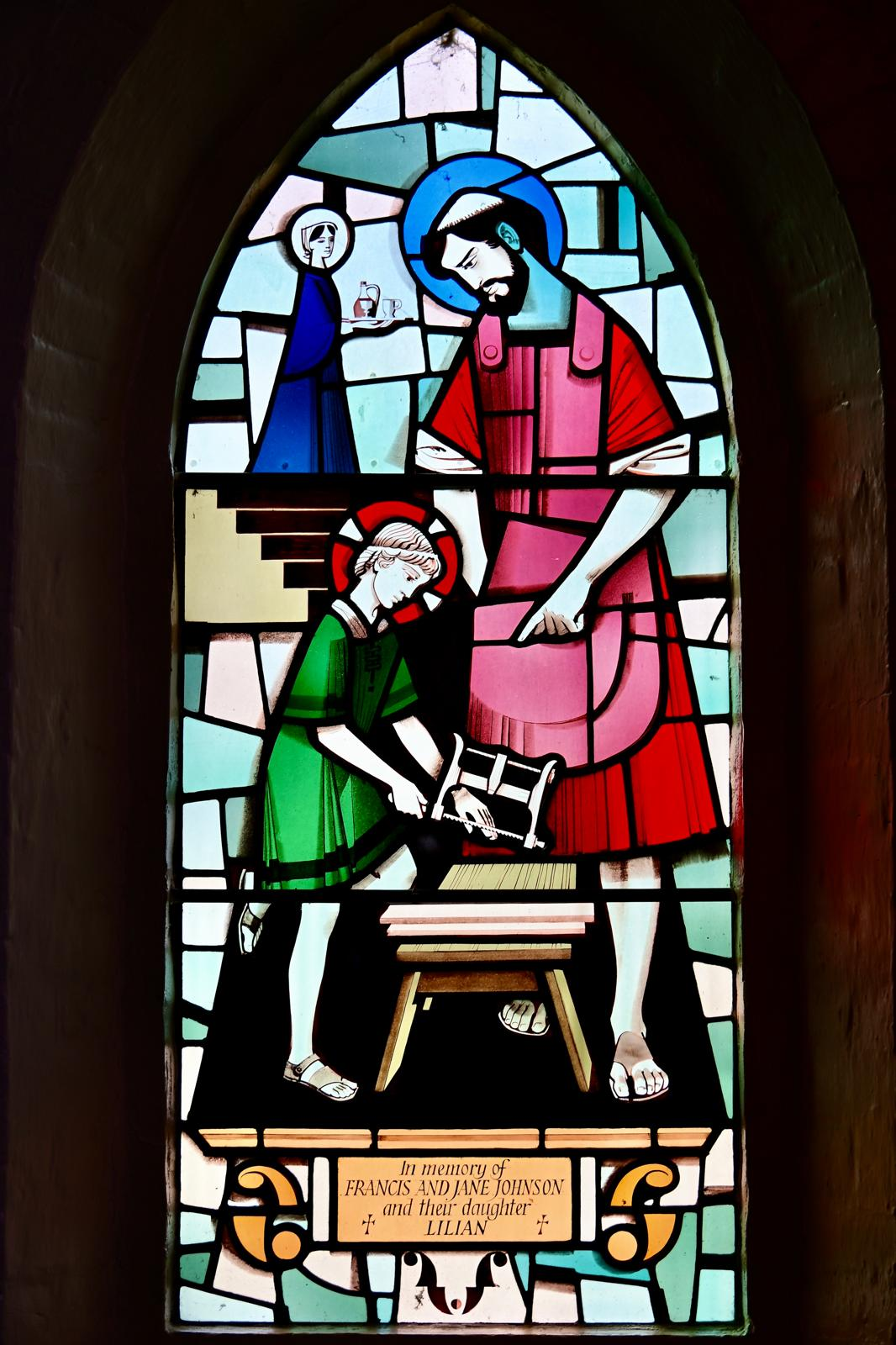
Christ Church, Shooters Hill - Jesus in the workshop of Joseph (1978)

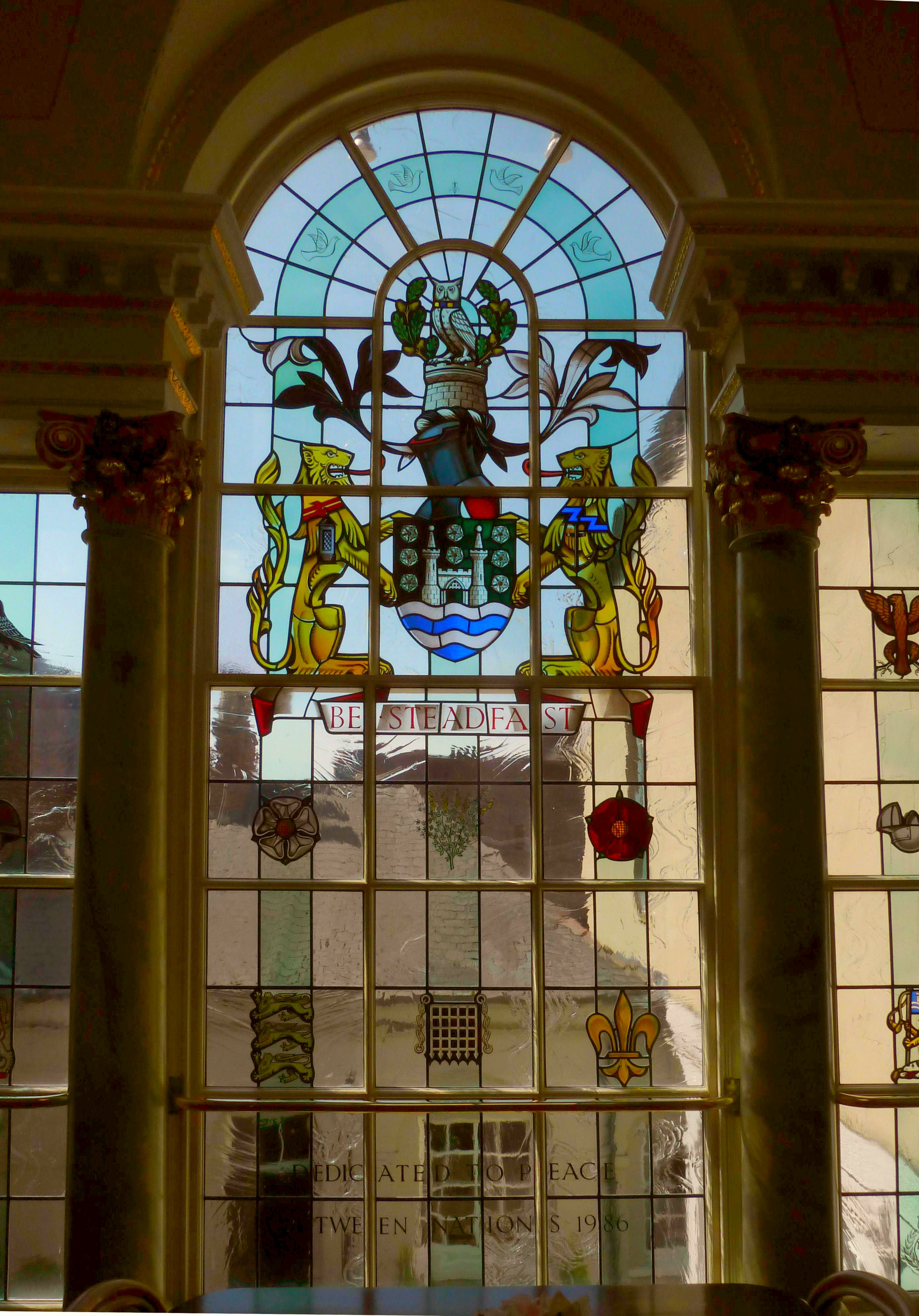
Mansion House Doncaster - International Year of Peace (1986)
