= Harry Harvey (Medal of Honor, 1865) =

American soldier (1846–1896)

Corporal Harry Harvey
- Born: Harry Huckman; December 14, 1846; England
- Died: April 2, 1896 (aged 49); Syracuse, New York
- Burial place: Myrtle Hill Cemetery
- Military career
- Allegiance: United States; Union
- Branch: United States Army; Union Army
- Rank: Corporal
- Units: (New York (state)) Company A, 22nd New York Volunteer Cavalry Regiment
- Awards: Medal of Honor

Harry Harvey (December 14, 1846 – April 2, 1896), originally named Harry Huckman, was a member of the United States Army who fought for the Union during the American Civil War, where he was awarded the Medal of Honor. He was born on December 14, 1846, in England, but moved to Rochester, New York. He entered service in Rochester and became a Corporal of Company A of the 22nd New York Volunteer Cavalry Regiment. He was awarded the Medal of Honor for action on March 2, 1865, in Waynesboro, Virginia. There, he is cited as capturing the "flag and bearer, with two other prisoners." He was issued his Medal of Honor on March 26, 1865. Harvey died on April 2, 1896, in Syracuse, New York, and was buried in Myrtle Hill Cemetery.

== See also ==
- Battle of Waynesboro, Virginia
- Carolinas campaign
- Philip Sheridan
