= Art of Birmingham =

Figures representing art (left) and industry (right), on the coat of arms of Birmingham

Birmingham has a distinctive culture of art and design that emerged in the 1750s, driven by the historic importance of the applied arts to the city's manufacturing economy. While other early industrial towns such as Manchester and Bradford were based on the manufacture of bulk commodities such as cotton and wool, Birmingham's economy from the 18th century onwards was built on the production of finished manufactured goods for European luxury markets. The sale of these products was dependent on high-quality design, and this resulted in the early growth of an extensive infrastructure for the education of artists and designers and for exhibiting their works, and placed Birmingham at the heart of debate about the role of the visual arts in the emerging industrial society.

The city's history in the fine arts also betrays this influence, with many of Birmingham's most notable artistic figures coming from a commercial or craft background. David Cox originally trained as a painter of theatrical scenery; Walter Langley and David Bomberg were both lithographers; the artists of the Birmingham Group practiced metalwork, book illustration and stained glass manufacture as well as painting; while backgrounds in advertising and commercial graphic design were key influences on the surrealism of Conroy Maddox and the pop art of Peter Phillips.

Birmingham's artistic influence has extended well beyond its borders: David Cox was a major figure of the Golden Age of English watercolour and an early precursor of Impressionism; Edward Burne-Jones was the dominant figure of late-Victorian English art and an influence on Symbolism, the Aesthetic movement, and Art Nouveau; David Bomberg was one of the pioneers of English modernism; and Peter Phillips was one of the key figures in the birth of pop art. The sculptor Raymond Mason and the designers John Baskerville, Augustus Pugin, Harry Weedon and Alec Issigonis are all major figures in the history of their fields, while more widely the city has been a notable centre of the Arts and Crafts, Pictorialist and Surrealist movements, and within the fields of metalwork, typography, sculpture, printmaking, photography and stained glass.

== Painting, drawing and printmaking ==
=== The Midlands Enlightenment and the Birmingham School of landscape ===
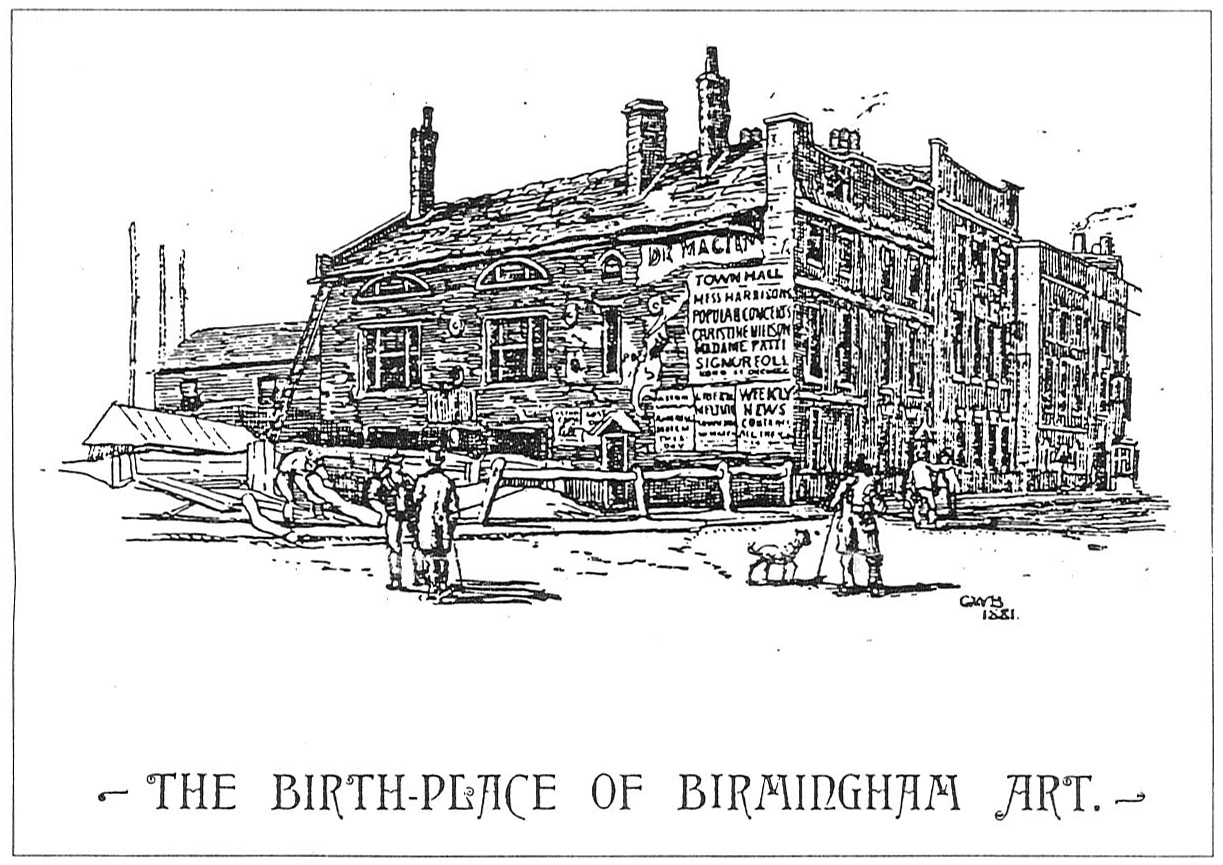
"The Birth-place of Birmingham Art" - Joseph Barber's studio in Edmund Street, Birmingham

Birmingham's tradition in applied arts such as jewellery and metalwork predates the Industrial Revolution, but organised activity in the fine arts of drawing, painting and printmaking began only with the town's huge growth in size and wealth in the 18th century, after the growing realisation of the importance of design skills to the town's manufacturers led to the establishment of several schools of drawing in the 1750s. The town's first known fine artists date from the period between the 1730s and the early 1760s, and were closely associated with prominent figures of the wider cultural awakening known as the Midlands Enlightenment. The first record of an artist working within Birmingham comes from the writer Samuel Johnson, who knew an Irish painter in Birmingham in the 1730s who taught him how to "live in a garret at eighteen pence a week". The portraitist Edward Alcock was living in Birmingham in 1759 and 1760 when he painted a portrait of the enlightenment poet and landscape gardener William Shenstone; and he still had strong links with the town in 1778, when he was commissioned to paint a portrait of Matthew Boulton and to draw pictures to be reproduced by polygraph in Boulton's factory.

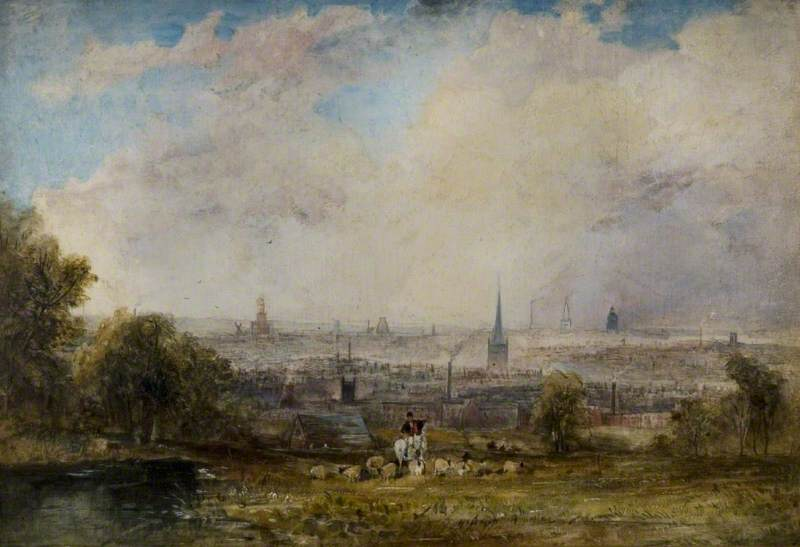
Thomas Creswick, Distant view of Birmingham (1828).

Particularly significant was Daniel Bond, whose career started as a painter and japanner in Boulton's Soho Manufactory, but who is recorded as exhibiting landscapes at the Society of Artists of Great Britain in London by 1761. He was to exhibit over forty works in London over following decades and it is with him that emerges the distinctive Birmingham School of landscape painting, whose influence was to last into the mid 19th century. Bond taught drawing and had a wide influence within the town – a pupil of his exhibited A Drawing of Landscape after Mr Bond of Birmingham at the Free Society of Artists in London as early as 1763. Among Bond's other pupils was Edward Barber, who also established himself as a drawing master within Birmingham, and whose elder brother Joseph Barber had established his own academy of drawing in Great Charles Street by 1780, which was continued after his death in 1811 by his son Vincent Barber. Among Joseph Barber's pupils was Samuel Lines, who established another academy in nearby Newhall Street in 1807. It is through these networks of teaching that the Birmingham tradition of landscape was developed and sustained, with notable later figures including Thomas Baker and Thomas Creswick – a pupil of both Lines and Barber, who was to become a notable Royal Academician in the 1850s and 1860s.

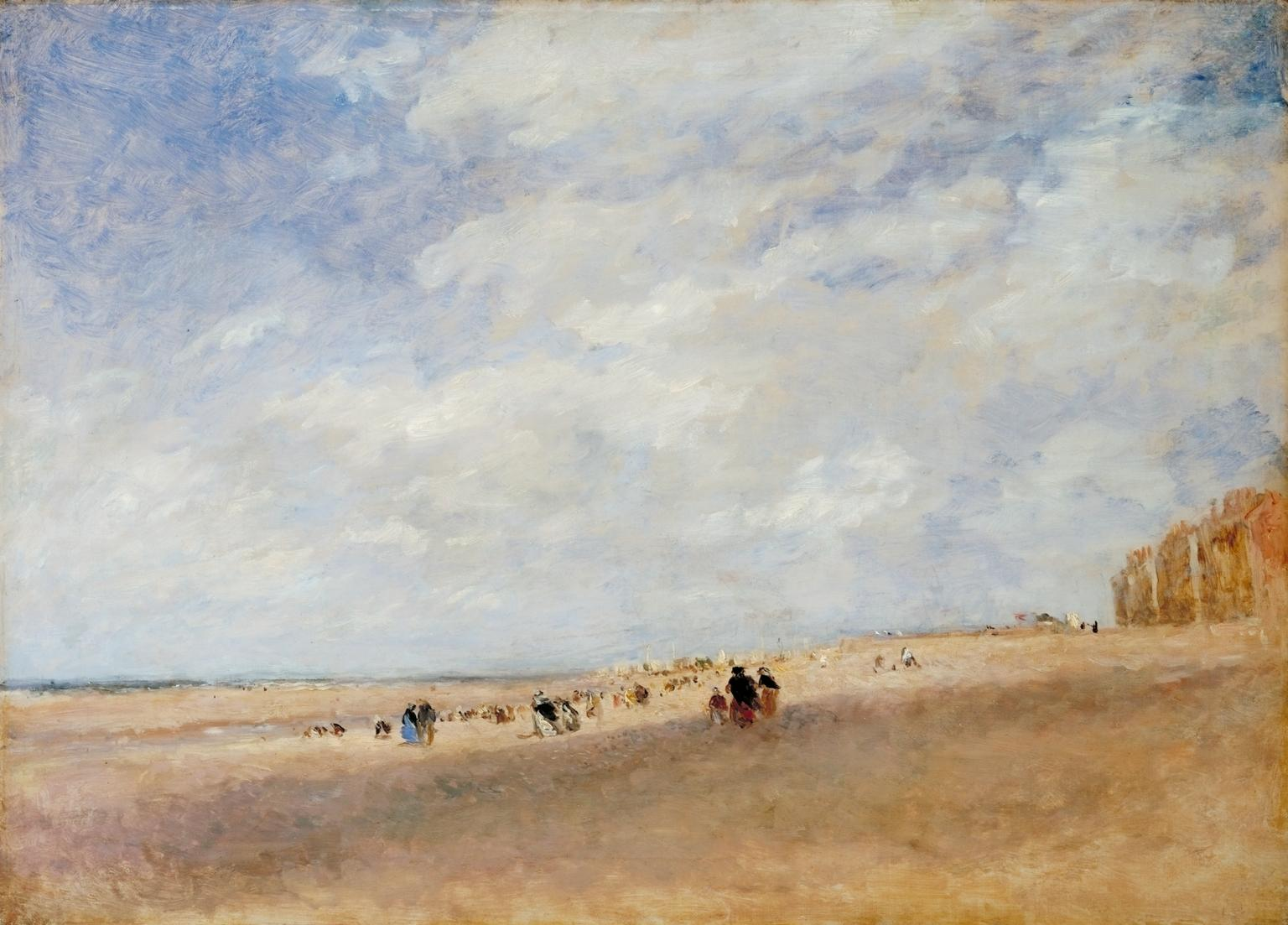
David Cox, Rhyl Sands (c.1854).

The landscape artists of the Birmingham School were distinguished primarily by their shared technique, being noted for portraying natural features such as trees with an emphasis on character rather than on precision, often adopting the techniques used in other disciplines such as portraiture to present "a quest for the essential, the quiddity of what is observed". The tradition of artists from Birmingham travelling to North Wales to seek the rugged rural scenes that formed the accepted idea of picturesque landscape was established by the 1790s and would continue into the 19th century, but early Birmingham School artists were also exploring the tension between picturesque rusticity and novelty, sophistication and the artificial by the late 18th century, and by the 1820s were examining how the traditional language of landscape art could be applied to the rapidly industrialising Birmingham area, through emphasising or exaggerating the rural characteristics of Birmingham's hinterland, presenting the town as a feature within a wider picturesque natural landscape, or depicting the tension between the area's rural and urban features.

By far the most significant figure of the Birmingham School, however – the most important Birmingham artist of the early-to-mid-19th century and the first to have an international influence – was the landscape painter David Cox. Born in Deritend in 1783, Cox studied under Joseph Barber in Birmingham and under Cornelius Varley in London, where his mastery of watercolour made him a major figure of the medium's "Golden Age". In 1841 Cox returned to Birmingham to live in Harborne and concentrate on painting in oils. Long overshadowed by the fame of his earlier watercolours, these later works have more recently attracted attention as "one of the greatest, but least recognised, achievements of any British painter." Cox's technique and approach in paintings such as Rhyl Sands (c. 1854) – described by the Tate as "without parallel in British landscape painting of the 1850s" – have led to his being seen, particularly within France, as an important precursor of Impressionism. His pictures were exhibited in Paris to wide acclaim in 1855 and are known to have been studied by Monet and Pissarro during their stay in London in 1870.

=== Institutional development ===
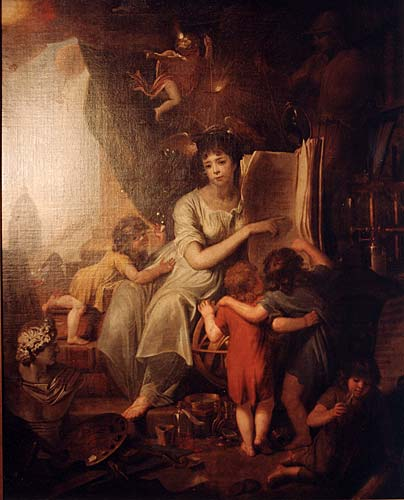
James Millar, Allegory of Science and Wisdom (1798), depicting the values of the Midlands Enlightenment in the shadow of the tower of Birmingham's St. Philip's Church

Artistic activity in late Georgian Birmingham was not restricted to landscape painting. A century later the London-based Magazine of Art could describe Birmingham as "perhaps the most artistic town in England", and the changes that would result in this transformation had already started by the 1780s. A local trade directory of 1785 lists twenty four professional artists, including the portraitist James Millar, the still life painter Moses Haughton and the portrait miniature painter James Bisset. Of widest influence was the Birmingham School of engravers – a separate group to the landscape artists but emerging similarly from the drawing academies of Joseph Barber, Vincent Barber and Samuel Lines. Formed around the younger Barber's pupils William Radclyffe, James Tibbitts Willmore and John Pye, and Lines' pupil William Wyon, this group were to dominate high-quality European printmaking in the 1850s and 1860s and revolutionise the art of book illustration, bringing contemporary art to a much wider public than ever before.

The first decades of the 19th century saw the gradual development of the institutions that would come to dominate the artistic life of Victorian Birmingham. In 1809 a group of eight artists including Samuel Lines, Charles Barber and Vincent Barber opened an academy of life drawing in Peck Lane, now the site of New Street railway station. This held its first exhibition of members' work in 1814 as the Birmingham Academy of Arts, and was refounded as the Birmingham Society of Arts under the patronage of wealthy local businessmen in 1821.

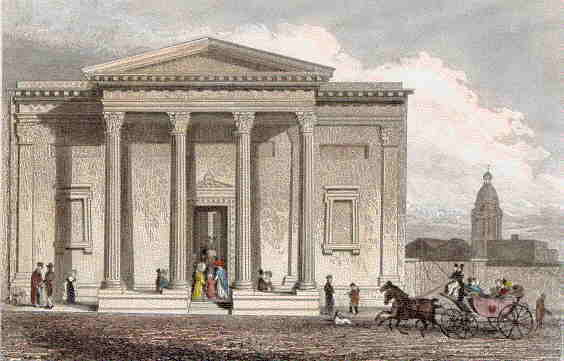
The Royal Birmingham Society of Artists' 1829 New Street home

The society was dogged by continual tension between its two roles: to its members the society was primarily for promoting Birmingham's artists and exhibiting their work, but to its wealthy patrons its importance was more as a training ground for designers needed for the town's manufacturing industries. This gave rise to a temporary split in 1821 over the patrons' decision to hold an exhibition of old masters instead of members' works. A second, permanent, split took place in 1842, the patrons forming the Society of Arts and Government School of Design - later the Birmingham School of Art - while the artists formed the separate Birmingham Society of Artists, which received royal patronage in 1868 as the Royal Birmingham Society of Artists.

By the 1820s Birmingham was supporting a vigorous market for contemporary art. While most British towns other than London relied on booksellers and carvers-and-gilders for the sale of pictures, Birmingham had specialist art dealers such as Allen Everitt – whose Artists' Repository and Exhibition of Pictures in Union Street opened in 1811 and which held regular exhibitions from 1817 – and Jones' Pantechnetheca in New Street, which opened in 1824 and where the walls of the picture gallery were "hung with a succession of paintings by the most able ancient and modern masters". An 1819 letter to the painter John Constable remarked that "we have picture sellers everywhere in Birmingham".

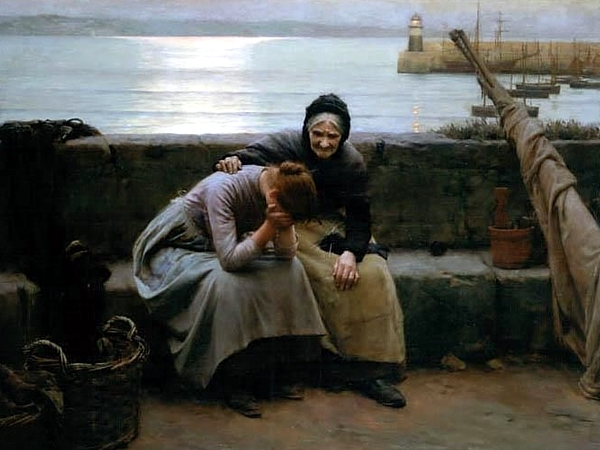
Walter Langley, Never morning wore to evening but some heart did break (1894)

Birmingham was also an important centre for Victorian art patronage, as the home of major collectors such as Joseph Gillott, Edwin Sharp and William Bullock. Gillott in particular had one of the largest and most important collections of the day. An early patron of Turner, he lay at the centre of a nationwide network of dealers, collectors and artists.

With this growth in Birmingham's artistic organisation came a more established artistic community. Birmingham had had only four professional artists in 1800, but by 1827 the overwhelming majority of the 67 local exhibitors at that year's Society of Arts exhibition were earning their living from the arts, as portraitists, miniaturists, engravers, or painters of still life or landscape. Helen Allingham was the first of a notable series of woman artists to study at the School of Art from the 1850s, that later featured Florence Camm, Kate Bunce and Georgie Gaskin.

The most prominent members of a generation of young painters from the School of Art were elected as the Society of Artists' first associates in the 1860s, including Walter Langley, William Wainwright, Frank Bramley and Edwin Harris. Of these the most significant was Langley, whose move to the Cornish fishing village of Newlyn in 1882 made him the first of the Newlyn School of plein air painters. Although he was later joined by Harris, Bramley, Wainwright and numerous London artists including Stanhope Forbes, Langley's work remained vital to the image of the Newlyn School and was matched only by that of Forbes for substance and consistency. His watercolour In faith and hope the world will disagree. But all mankind's concern is charity was singled out as "a beautiful and true work of art" by Leo Tolstoy in his book What is Art? and in 1895 Langley was invited by the Uffizi in Florence to contribute a self portrait to hang alongside those of Raphael, Rubens and Rembrandt in their collection of portraits of great artists.

=== Burne-Jones and the Pre-Raphaelites ===
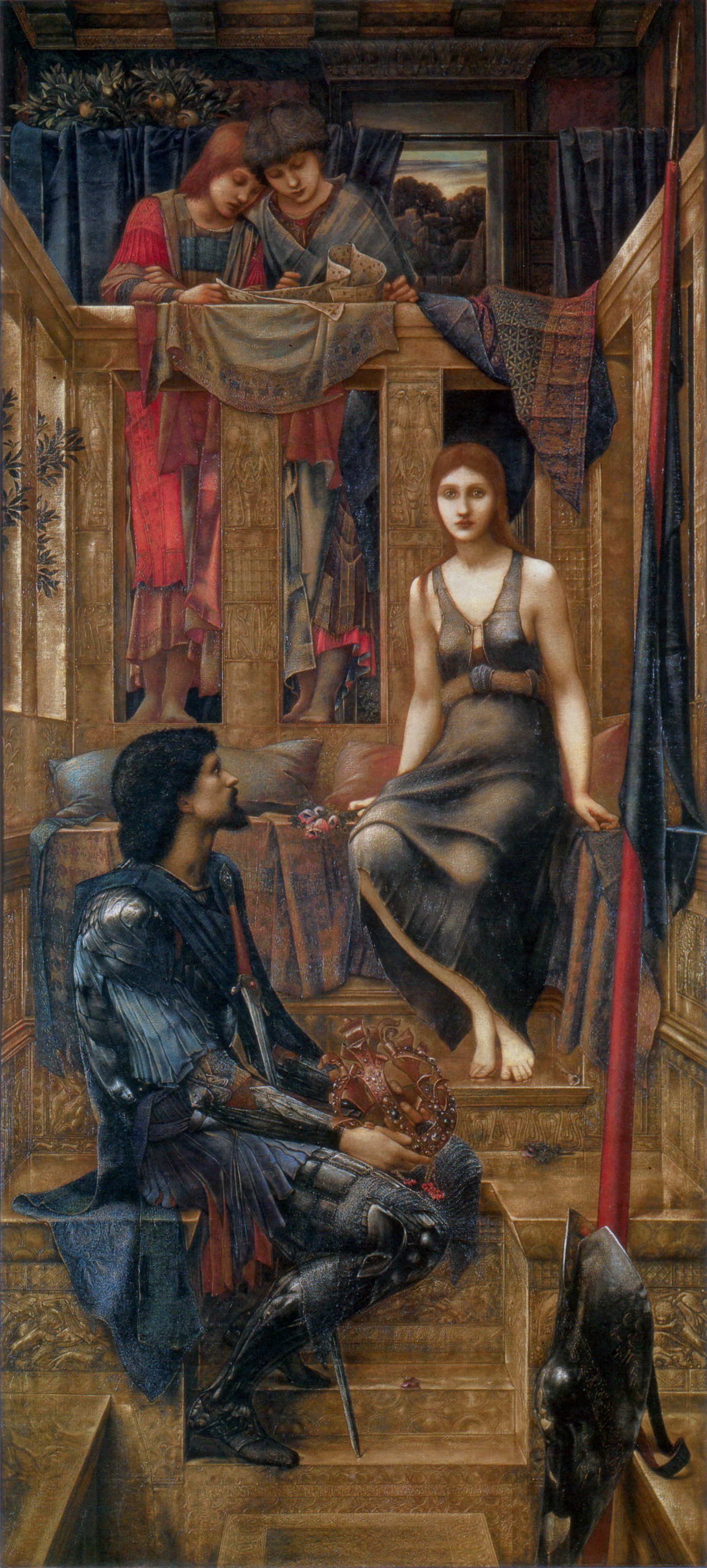
Edward Burne-Jones, King Cophetua and the Beggar Maid (1884)

Birmingham was already being recognised as a centre of Pre-Raphaelitism by the 1850s. At a time when the controversial new movement was still exciting the hostility of the London press, the 1852 exhibition of Millais's Ophelia at the annual exhibition of the Birmingham Society of Artists provoked the radical Birmingham Journal – the town's most popular newspaper – to display a front-page article analysing the picture, praising its "erratic genius" and "independent thought" and contrasting it with the "traditions of the schools" and the "slavish reproduction of the academy models". Further Pre-Raphaelite works were sought the following year, with Holman Hunt's Strayed Sheep being singled out as "one that ought to be studied ... with an intelligent appreciation of its peculiar beauties and special teachings." Camille Pissarro would later write to his son "It is a pity you were not able to go to Birmingham to see the assembled masters of Pre-Raphaelitism ... the provinces in England are more sympathetic to innovation."

Birmingham's natural sympathy for emerging radical art movements was driven partly by the town's distinctive social and economic structure. During the 19th century the artistic tastes of England's landed aristocracy remained focused on old masters and established classical models, and these in turn provided the cultural template for the small number of vastly wealthy new mill owners of the growing textile towns such as Manchester, who modelled themselves on existing aristocratic patterns of patronage. By contrast the more broadly based economy of Birmingham was built upon on small units of production and a skilled craft-based workforce, leading to an unprecedented demand for modern paintings from the rapidly expanding and newly wealthy middle class, and a widespread belief in the moral and political implications of visual aesthetics, influenced by Augustus Pugin and the Gothic Revival and driven by its direct relevance to Birmingham's day-to-day economic reality.

It was from this environment that Edward Burne-Jones emerged to become the most influential of all Birmingham artists, establishing himself as the dominant figure of late-Victorian English art and bringing the spirit of the Pre-Raphaelites decisively into the mainstream. Born on Bennetts Hill in 1833 he studied at King Edward's School, the Birmingham School of Art and Exeter College, Oxford, where he became a key member of the Birmingham Set and met his lifelong friend and collaborator William Morris. Leaving Oxford without graduating, he fell under the influence of John Ruskin and worked in the studio of Dante Gabriel Rossetti.

Burne-Jones' early work was heavily influenced by Rossetti, but by the 1860s he was increasingly incorporating the influence of painters of the early Italian Renaissance, and himself becoming an influence on younger artists such as Walter Crane and Simeon Solomon. He retired from public exhibition for much of the 1870s, but his return in 1877 was to prove a sensation, with him established as probably the most celebrated artist of his generation. He was to be widely influential on the Symbolists, the Aesthetic movement, and Art Nouveau.

=== The Birmingham Group ===
Joseph Southall, Hortus Inclusus (1898)

The 1890s saw the emergence of a loosely connected group of like-minded radical artists who would later become known as the Birmingham Group. All had studied at the Birmingham School of Art after the reorganisation of its teaching methods by Edward R. Taylor in the 1880s, and all had been deeply imbued with the philosophy and practices of the Arts and Crafts Movement, of which they were to become leading exponents. Many went on to teach at the school and become associated with other more formal organisations such as the Birmingham Guild of Handicraft or the Bromsgrove Guild.

Breaking down the distinction between the fine and applied arts was a key aim of the movement, and Birmingham Group artists practiced across a variety of disciplines, producing stained glass, jewellery, metalwork, embroidery, hand printed books and furniture as well as pictures. In painting they emphasised the role of a picture in the context of a wider work or space, often producing murals or frescos for specific buildings, presenting easel pictures in custom-built frames considered integral to the work of art, and working in exacting media such as tempera or watercolour on vellum, where the creation of the materials was an essential part of the creation of the work.

Maxwell Armfield, Self-Portrait (1901)

The first indication of the rise of a distinctive group artists was the 1893 commission of a set of murals for Birmingham Town Hall from artists including Kate Bunce, Henry Payne, Charles March Gere, Sidney Meteyard and Bernard Sleigh, while most were still students. The group's greatest collective work was the later decoration of the interior of the chapel of Madresfield Court near Malvern in 1902, which featured frescoes and stained glass by Payne, an altarpiece by Gere and a crucifix designed and made by Arthur and Georgie Gaskin.

The key individual artist however was Joseph Southall, arguably the most important of all Arts and Crafts painters and the leader of the revival of painting in tempera in the late 1880s. Although he never taught at the School of Art, he provided training in tempera techniques at his studio in Edgbaston to other group members such as Arthur Gaskin and Maxwell Armfield, and exhibited widely internationally, particularly in France, where he was widely admired.

While the influence of Burne-Jones and the Pre-Raphaelites on the Birmingham Group is clear, modern scholarship has also seen links with later movements in art. The Last Romantics exhibition at the Barbican Art Gallery in 1989 positioned the group as the link connecting the romanticism of the Pre-Raphaelites to that of the later symbolists of the Slade School. Southall himself has been seen as a precursor of surrealism, with John Russell Taylor writing that "there is undoubtedly an authentic strangeness in the way he saw things ... we are much more likely to find ourselves thinking of Magritte and Balthus and Chirico than of anyone nearer to this apparently stick-in-the-mud Arts-and-Craftsman."

=== Early 20th-century art ===
After the Arts and Crafts and Pre-Raphaelite triumphs of the late 19th century, the early 20th century was marked by a prevailing conservatism among Birmingham's major artistic institutions. The Arts and Crafts consensus established at the School of Art and Royal Birmingham Society of Artists in the 1880s held firm, and new generations of painters tended to either maintain an academic figurative style – Bernard Fleetwood-Walker being among the more notable examples – or prosper elsewhere. In 1925 the Birmingham Post published an editorial asking "why is it that Birmingham has ceased to count as an important centre of Art?", criticising the RBSA as being controlled by "a small group of men who have arrogated to themselves the responsibility for deciding what is and isn't art ... entirely out of sympathy with modern movements ... having stood still for at least twenty years" By 1930 even Solomon Kaines Smith, the keeper of the Birmingham Museum and Art Gallery and himself hardly a radical figure, was commenting in the Birmingham Post that "you are actually reducing and throwing back the possibilities and progress of your own city by basing yourself solely on 1890".

The opening of the Ruskin Galleries in Chamberlain Square by John Gibbins in 1925 provided an outlet for the gradual emergence of more progressive generation of Birmingham artists. In the same year The Artist-Craftsmen Group presented an exhibition at the gallery of work "done in the white heat of experiment" and subsequently renamed themselves the "Modern Group". The gallery's immediate impact was noted in the national press in 1926: "when Birmingham seemed hopeless and the modernists felt like exiles in the desert, a miracle happened .... Mr Gibbins has almost revolutionised the artistic life of Birmingham".

Away from this group more progressive figures were few and their connections with Birmingham slight: Malcolm Drummond, later a member of the Camden Town Group, was educated at The Oratory School in Edgbaston; and Henry Tonks, who became a stalwart of the New English Art Club and was to train an entire generation of English modernists at London's Slade School of Art around the start of the 20th century, was brought up in a family of Birmingham brass foundry proprietors.

David Bomberg, In the Hold (c. 1914)

The most radical artist associated with the city during this period was David Bomberg, who was born to a Polish-Jewish family on Sutton Street in the Lee Bank area of Birmingham in 1890. Growing up in Whitechapel in the East End of London he returned to Birmingham to train as a lithographer before studying under the Birmingham-born Henry Tonks at the Slade School of Art. Loosely associated with the vorticist movement, he was one of the few English artists to wholeheartedly embrace cubism and futurism in the years leading up to the First World War, painting a series of strikingly angular works before his disillusionment with the mechanised slaughter of World War I led him to develop a more representational style from the 1920s onwards. Virtually forgotten by the time of his death in 1956, his influence has grown since. The New York Times described him as a "neglected British genius" in 1988, and by 2006 Richard Cork could remark that Bomberg was "now considered one of the most important and influential British painters of the twentieth century".

Birmingham's printmaking tradition revived with a generation of influential etchers in the 1930s. Henry Rushbury worked under Henry Payne and illustrated notable books on the architecture of Paris and Rome before becoming Keeper of the Royal Academy from 1949 to 1964. Gerald Brockhurst – dubbed a "young Botticelli" when he entered the Birmingham School of Art at the age of 12 – became one of the best known and most celebrated portraitists, first in England and then in the United States, painting over 600 portraits including those of Marlene Dietrich and the Duchess of Windsor. He is best known for his etchings, however, which are "among the most suavely realized and technically adept works of art in any period" and "epitomize an elegance and panache that we associate with the decades between the two world wars."

=== The Birmingham Surrealists ===
Conroy Maddox, The Strange Country (1940)

The most sustained challenge to Birmingham's conservative Arts and Crafts consensus in the first half of the 20th century came from the Birmingham Surrealists, who emerged as a group from 1935 and whose leading figures included the painters Conroy Maddox, John Melville and Emmy Bridgwater, the art critic Robert Melville and later the artists Desmond Morris and Oscar Mellor. John Melville had been one of the "harbingers of surrealism" in Britain, being identified as a surrealist by 1932, and he and Maddox did much to advance British surrealist practice by introducing the principle of visual distortion.

The early years of the group were marked by a conscious rejection not just of Birmingham's artistic conservatism – John Melville having six paintings banned from an exhibition at Birmingham Museum and Art Gallery in 1938 for being "detremental (sic) to public sensibility" – but also what they saw as the inauthenticity of the Surrealist Group in England, which had formed in London around Roland Penrose and Herbert Read. The London group, it was felt, "did not understand surrealism", reducing it to a mere continuation of English romanticism, and the Birmingham artists concentrated instead on building links with what they saw as the more authentic surrealists on the continent. This culminated in the open letter sent by Maddox and the Melvilles refusing to exhibit at the 1936 London International Surrealist Exhibition, decrying the presence of "artists who in their day to day activities, professional habits and ethics could be called anti-surrealist".

Emmy Bridgwater, Untitled (1941), Pen and ink on paper

The relationship between the surrealists of London and Birmingham improved greatly with the arrival in London in mid-1938 of the Belgian E. L. T. Mesens, who had some sympathy with the Birmingham artists' views and whose role as Director of the London Gallery made him effectively the leader of London surrealism. Maddox was invited to the group's October 1938 meeting at the personal insistence of André Breton and both he and Melville exhibited in the Living Art in England exhibition of 1939.

The major Birmingham artists joined the Surrealist Group in England over the following year and were to form the group's most dynamic members during World War II and through the subsequent years of the decade. Robert Melville played a key role in the conception of Toni del Renzio's publication Arson in 1942 and Maddox was the organiser with John Banting of 1940's notoriously confrontational Surrealism Today exhibition. In 1947 Maddox and Bridgwater featured among only six English artists selected by André Breton for the final International Surrealist Exhibition in Paris, but with British surrealism viewed as a spent force in the post-war era the group broke up in the early 1950s.

=== Post-war art ===
Peter Phillips, INsuperSET (1963)

Birmingham artists took leading international roles in several artistic developments during the post-war period. Peter Phillips, who was born in the city and both studied and taught at the Birmingham School of Art, was one of the central figures in the birth of Pop Art. In the early 1960s he produced some of the movement's earliest works, combining the influence of his Birmingham training in advertising and technical drawing with the layout and structure of early Italian Renaissance altarpieces. His presidency of the 1961 Young Contemporaries exhibition was pivotal to the emergence of British Pop Art as a coherent and widely recognised phenomenon.

William Gear – a student of Fernand Léger and the only British member of the avant-garde CoBrA movement – had close links with Birmingham, exhibiting with the Birmingham Artists Committee and forming links with the Birmingham Surrealists in the 1940s, before finally moving to the city to teach at the School of Art in 1964. Later that decade John Salt's obsessively detailed paintings of cars and mobile homes in the American landscape made him the only major English artist among the pioneers of photorealism.

More locally, the formation of the Ikon Gallery in the 1960s provided a focus for a distinctive group of artists including David Prentice, Trevor Denning, Robert Groves, Jesse Bruton and Sylvani Merilion.

Keith Piper, The Black Assassin Saints (1982)

Birmingham's highly cosmopolitan population was an increasing influence on its art in the late 20th century. The formation of the BLK Art Group in the early 1980s by Black British Birmingham artists Keith Piper, Donald Rodney and Marlene Smith, together with Eddie Chambers from nearby Wolverhampton, was a pivotal point in the establishment of the non-white experience as an integral part of British culture. Members of the group acted as activists, curators and promoters to challenge the white establishment of the art world; their art drew on the language both of American Black Nationalism and indigenous English identity, while they simultaneously challenged Black culture itself to move away from being defined by heterosexual black males.

The late 20th century also saw the growth of alternative art forms. The Birmingham Arts Lab nurtured an influential generation working in comic art in the late 1960s and 1970s, including Suzy Varty, Ed Barker, Steve Bell and Hunt Emerson. Graffiti (or "spraycan art") culture appeared in the early 1980s, with the area featuring in Channel 4 documentary Bombing. Local artists who use urban Birmingham as their canvas (this is illegal, and regarded by some as vandalism) have included Chu and Goldie. Street art competitions are still regularly held at the Custard Factory. In 2002 the Jewellery Quarter-based Temper was the first graffiti artist to have a solo exhibition at a major British public gallery.

=== Contemporary artists ===
Today Birmingham artists work across a wide range of subjects, styles and media. Several Birmingham artists have won or been shortlisted for the Turner Prize including the video artist Gillian Wearing, winner of the 1997 prize, the abstract painter John Walker who was shortlisted in 1985, and Young British Artist Richard Billingham, shortlisted in 2001.

The Digbeth area of the city is particularly important in Birmingham's contemporary art scene, with numerous artists and organisations grouped in and around studio complexes like the Custard Factory, galleries such as the media art centre VIVID, and artist-run spaces such as Eastside Projects. Significant concentrations of artists, writers and curators also exist in the Jewellery Quarter, and in Balsall Heath, Moseley and King's Heath in the south of the city.

A variety of contemporary public art is located around the city centre, most of it created by artists from outside the Midlands. The construction of the Bull Ring Shopping Centre in 2003 included three light wands which were erected at the main entrance, a huge mural on a glass façade located at the entrance facing New Street station and three fountains in St Martin's Square in the shape of cubes, which are illuminated at night in different colours.

Contemporary African Caribbean artists and photographers who have exhibited internationally include Pogus Caesar, Keith Piper and the late Donald Rodney.

== Sculpture ==
=== Georgian and Victorian sculpture ===
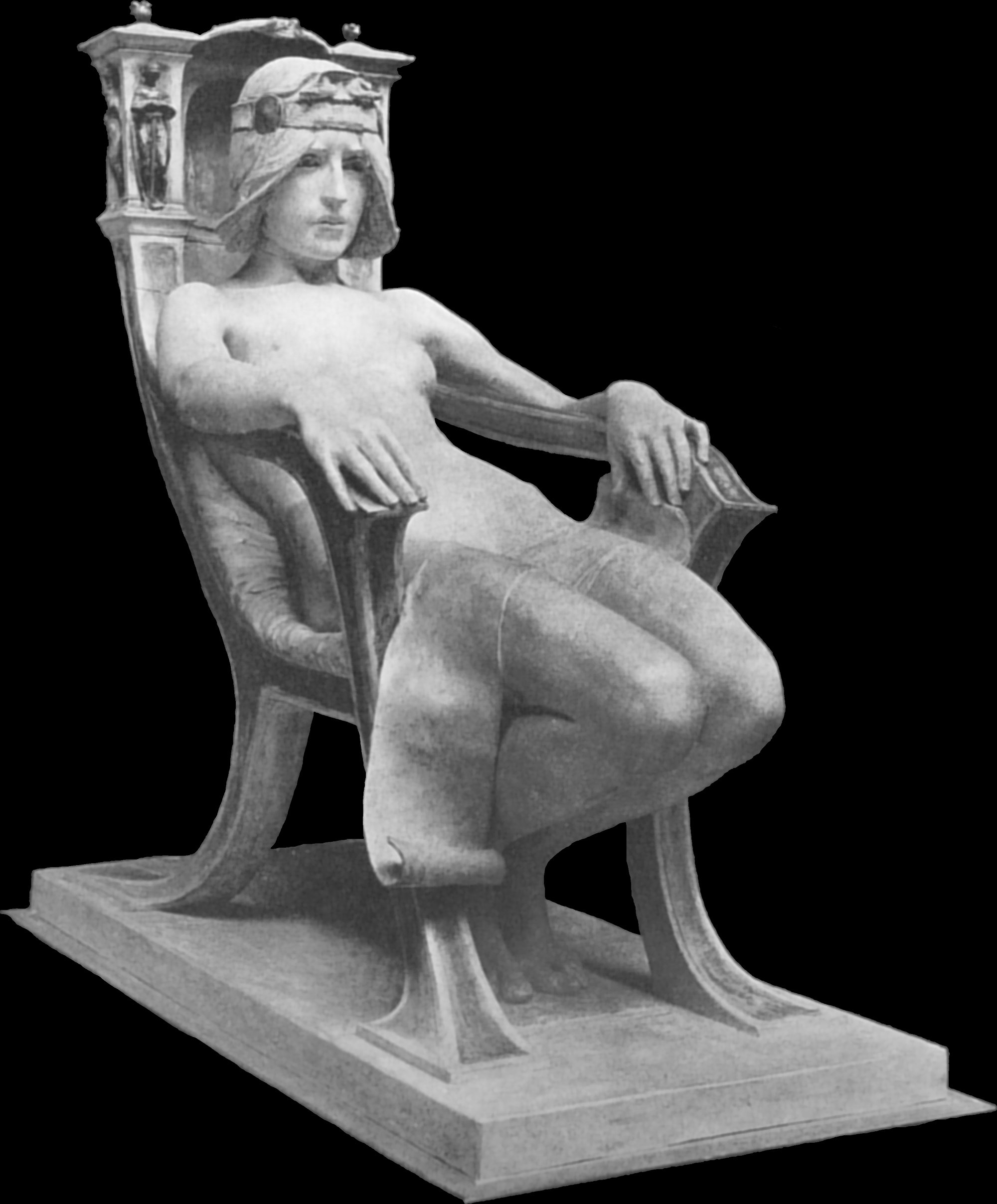
Albert Toft, The Spirit of Contemplation (1901)

Birmingham is the only English city outside London to have an unbroken tradition of sculpture production extending back to the mid-18th century. The town's sculpture workshops developed from earlier local traditions of working in stone and metal: there is evidence of stonemasons working in Birmingham as far back as the 14th century; richly ornamented sculptural metalwork was being produced in the town from the 17th century onwards; and humanistic small-scale figurative sculpture can be seen in the silverware and pattern books of Matthew Boulton from the 1750s. The first recognisably fine art stone carver was Edward Grubb of Birmingham, who was producing ecclesiastic carvings and statuary in Birmingham by 1769. The growth of Birmingham sculpture over the following decades was rapid, and by 1829 the majority of the 49 pieces of sculpture exhibited in the town's exhibitions that year came from local artists. The leading Birmingham sculptor of the Midlands Enlightenment, however, was Peter Hollins, who took over the studio of his father William Hollins in the Jewellery Quarter and produced over sixty major works. Hollins studied under Francis Chantrey in the early part of his career and his best work is considered the equal to that of Chantrey, although he was less famous at least partly because of being based outside London.

The dominance of neoclassical sculpture lessened in the later 19th century, and the following generation of Birmingham sculptors was largely defined by its relationship with the Birmingham School of Art, which under Edward R. Taylor emphasised the relationship between high art and craftsmanship, and was closely aligned to Birmingham's dominant Civic Gospel ideology. Albert Toft was a prominent exponent of the New Sculpture, his works exhibiting the movement's characteristic naturalism in form and spiritualism in mood. Benjamin Creswick was the leading sculptor of the Arts and Crafts-dominated Birmingham Group, working in a wide variety of genres and expanding the iconography of Birmingham sculpture with imagery of working men and compositions examining the relationship between arts, crafts and learning.

=== 20th century sculpture ===
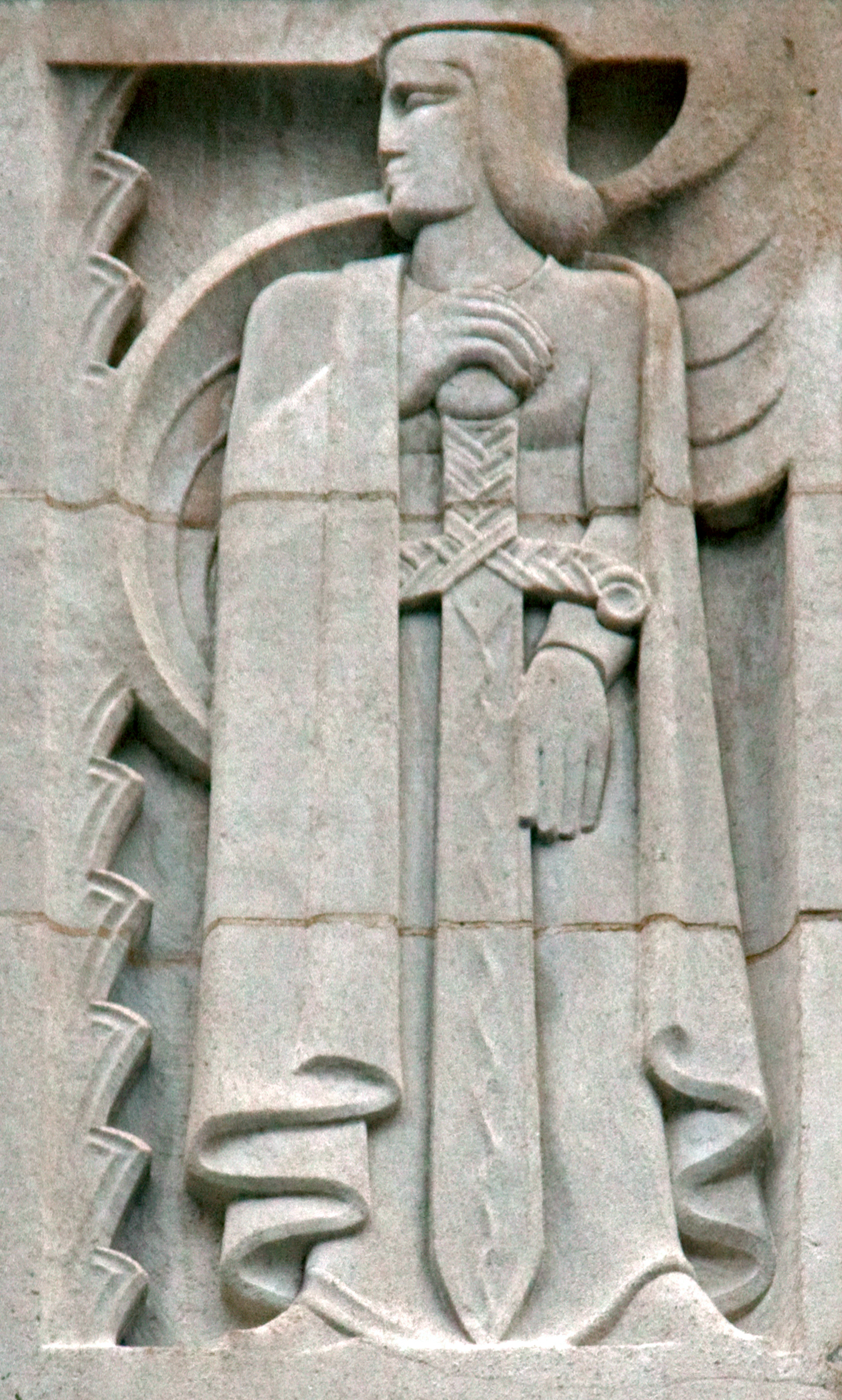
William Bloye, Fortitude (1932)

20th century Birmingham sculpture was dominated by the figure of William Bloye, who combined the arts and crafts tradition of Benjamin Creswick with the avant-garde edge of Eric Gill, with whom he worked at Ditchling in Sussex. Bloye was the Head of Sculpture at Birmingham School of Art from 1919 to 1956 and became the city's unofficial civic sculptor – producing everything from pub signs to the bas-reliefs on the city's Hall of Memory war memorial. Several generations of sculptors who trained under Bloye at the School of Art later worked as assistants at his studio in Small Heath before establishing themselves independently, including notable figures such as John Poole, Gordon Herickx, Ian Walters and Raymond Mason.

Outside the city's Bloye-dominated mainstream, the surrealist sculptor Oliver O'Connor Barrett was active in Birmingham between 1927 and 1942, the portrait sculptor David McFall studied and worked in the city throughout the 1930s, while Hans Schwarz produced sculpture in the city from the time of his exile from Nazi Austria in the 1940s until his move to London in the 1960s.

Bloye's replacement at the School of Art when he retired in 1956 was John Bridgeman, one of the first British sculptors to embrace fibreglass, plastics, concrete and fondue cement as sculptural materials and a pioneer of new sculptural forms such as play sculpture and sculpture integrated within buildings' architecture. His arrival marked a break with the city's existing tradition and the decisive ascendency of abstract sculpture.

In 1972, a 550 cm (18 ft)-tall, fibreglass Statue of King Kong, by London pop artist Nicholas Monro, was erected in The Bull Ring as part of a public art initiative. After six months, though, it was sold to a second-hand car dealer who used it as an advertisement. In 1976 it was sold again, outside the city, though there are occasional calls to return it from its current home at Penrith.

The city has continued to produce notable sculptors, with recent figures including Barry Flanagan and David Patten.

== Photography ==
Victorian photographer Sir Benjamin Stone (1838–1914) lived and worked in Erdington, Birmingham. The Birmingham Central Library now holds the Benjamin Stone Collection. The Victorian "father of art photography", Oscar Gustave Rejlander lived and worked at nearby Wolverhampton, and was a founder member of the Birmingham Photographic Society. The BPS later elected Henry Peach Robinson as a member.

The photographer Bill Brandt made an extensive series of photographs for the Bournville Village Trust in Birmingham, between 1939 and 1943. These have been published as the book Homes Fit For Heroes (Dewi Lewis, 2004). The post-war changes in the cityscape, especially the clearance of older housing and the changes to the central markets, were documented by Phyllis Nicklin (1913?-1969).

Notable photographers include Pogus Caesar, his OOM Gallery Archive holds in excess of 18,000 35mm archival images from 1982–present. Caesar's recent exhibitions include From Jamaica Row - Rebirth of the Bullring, Muzik Kinda Sweet and That Beautiful Thing, his work is represented in Birmingham Museum & Art Gallery Victoria and Albert Museum, London National Portrait Gallery, London Leicester Museum & Art Gallery Mappin Art Gallery, Sheffield Wolverhampton Art GalleryIn late 1979, Derek Bishton (now Consultant Editor for The Daily Telegraph), John Reardon (became Picture Editor of The Observer), and Brian Homer were three community photographers and activists in Handsworth, and they facilitated the 'Handsworth Self Portrait' series of self-portraits on the streets of Handsworth, Birmingham.

== Design ==
=== Early English typography ===
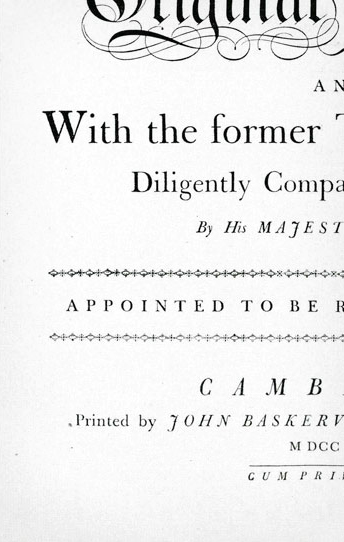
Bible typeset by John Baskerville for Cambridge University Press in 1763

Birmingham has been a centre for the printing of books at least as far back as the 1650s, and the area's earliest notable contribution to design was in the field of typography, where it achieved international importance in the 18th century and played a prominent role in the rise of English influence in a field previously dominated by German, Italian, French and Dutch designers. William Caslon – the designer of the Caslon typefaces and the first significant English typographer – came from nearby Cradley, and almost certainly trained as an engraver in Birmingham in the years before 1716. Most notable however was the Birmingham printer John Baskerville, who designed the Baskerville typeface in 1754. The influence of this type design across Europe would be huge as one of the key milestones in the transition from the old-style typefaces of Fournier to the modern-style type of Bodoni and Didot, and it is a font still widely used today in applications from the logo of New York's Metropolitan Opera to the branding of the Federal Government of Canada. Several of Baskerville's employees went on to become type designers themselves, most notably William Martin, whose Bulmer typeface is also still widely used.

Baskerville's design innovations extended beyond type design itself into typesetting, graphic design and page layout, where he moved away from the then-current use of decorative symbols and embellishments, instead emphasising the use of visual proportion and white space to maintain aesthetic appeal. In the words of a 2001 British Library publication, "such simplicity, even minimalism, was revolutionary. It was a defining moment in bookmaking, ridding it of the irrelevant, flowery decoration of hitherto".

=== The birth of industrial design ===
Birmingham was at the forefront of the 18th century emergence of industrial design as a discipline. Across Europe prior to the Industrial Revolution, the design and the manufacture of products generally took place together, executed manually by individual craftsmen as a single activity. By contrast, Birmingham's rise by 1791 to become "the first manufacturing town in the world" was based on the division of labour, the mechanisation of production, and relentless innovation in the development of new products, materials and production techniques, with large numbers of medium-sized workshops mass-producing luxury products for the international markets defined by the town's cosmopolitan mercantile networks. These markets were dictated by fashion, which meant that design was critical to the town's economic success. Birmingham's manufactures had to equal or ideally surpass the styling and sophistication of craft-based European competitors in London and Paris – "for the London season the Spitalfields silk weavers produced each year their new designs, and the Birmingham toy-makers their buttons, buckles, patchboxes, snuff boxes, chatelaines, watches, watch seals ... and other jewellery".

As part of this growth of new production processes a class of specialist "art-workers" emerged in Birmingham, who engraved, painted, modelled or decorated the products of the town's manufacturers. Some of these set themselves up as better-paid freelance designers, offering services to larger manufacturers drawing or modelling new products. As early as 1760 the House of Commons reported that Birmingham had "30 or 40 Frenchmen or Germans constantly engaged in Drawing and Designing". Taking on assistants and apprentices, some of the more successful studios and workshops developed into design schools during the 1750s, as suggested by an anonymous "Well-Wisher" who, writing in the Birmingham Gazette in 1754, had proposed the creation of an academy funded by subscription "for teaching some young persons, under proper restrictions, in the art of drawing and designing". The economic importance of design also meant that it was a prestigious activity within the town – the more successful designers enjoyed a social status similar to that of the larger manufacturers, and pupils at Birmingham's drawing and modelling academies included the sons of middle class professionals as well as artisans.

=== The Arts and Crafts Movement ===
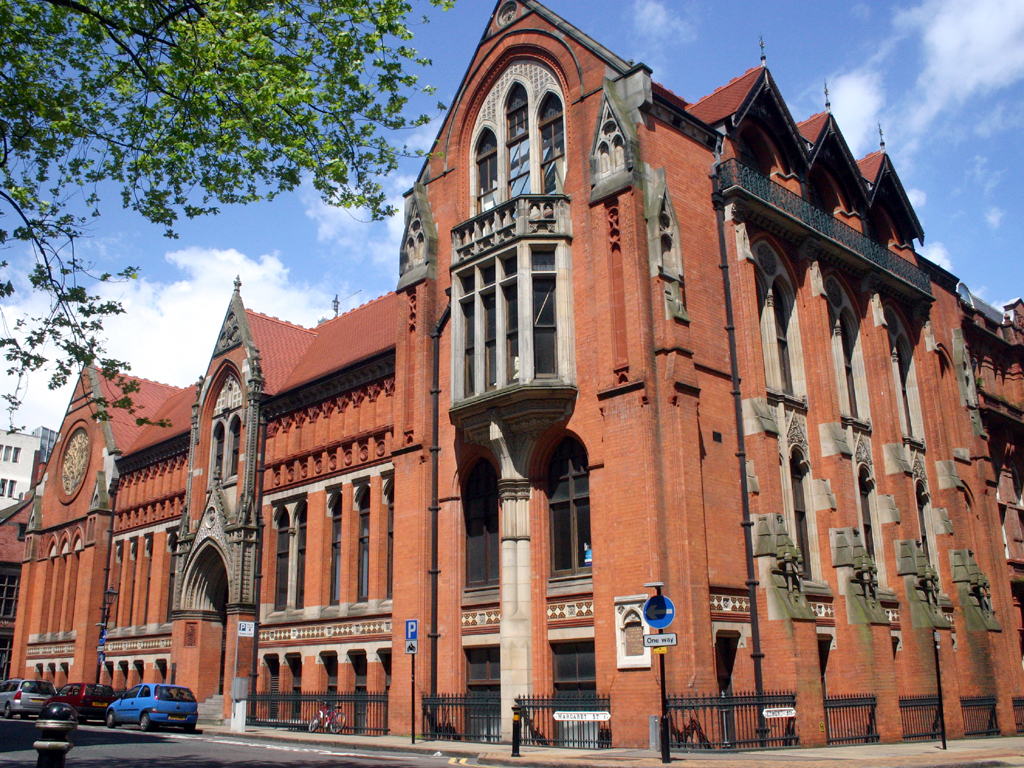
The Birmingham School of Art

If Birmingham took a leading role in the separation of design and manufacture during the Industrial Revolution, it was also prominent in the reaction against its perceived social and aesthetic consequences a century later. The Arts and Crafts Movement had deep roots in the town: its historical origins and many of its cultural roots lay with the Birmingham Set – a group of undergraduates at Oxford in the 1850s that formed around a nucleus who had studied at Birmingham's King Edward's School; it was in Birmingham in 1855 that the movement's founders William Morris and Edward Burne-Jones had decided to abandon the priesthood and become architect and artist; its spiritual godfather A. W. N. Pugin had produced some of his earliest work in Birmingham; and three of the founder members of John Ruskin's Guild of St George were Birmingham men.

However it was the appointment of Edward R. Taylor to the headmastership of the Birmingham School of Art in 1877 that was to lead to the ideology and aesthetic of the Arts and Crafts Movement becoming the dominant feature in Birmingham's visual culture. Taylor and the school's chairman John Henry Chamberlain persuaded William Morris to accept the appointment as the school's President for two years from 1878 – the start of a 20-year relationship between Morris and the school that saw him act as lecturer and examiner, and as a commissioner of work from the school's students. In 1881 Birmingham became the first art school to incorporate Morris's ideas into its teaching introducing the then-revolutionary principle of teaching techniques of design and manufacture together. Instead of just drawing their designs on paper, Birmingham students executed them as finished products in the materials for which they were intended. In 1883 the school broke completely from the control of the national system of art education, with its rigidly prescribed systems of theoretical instruction controlled from South Kensington, and became the first British art school to establish itself fully under local municipal control.

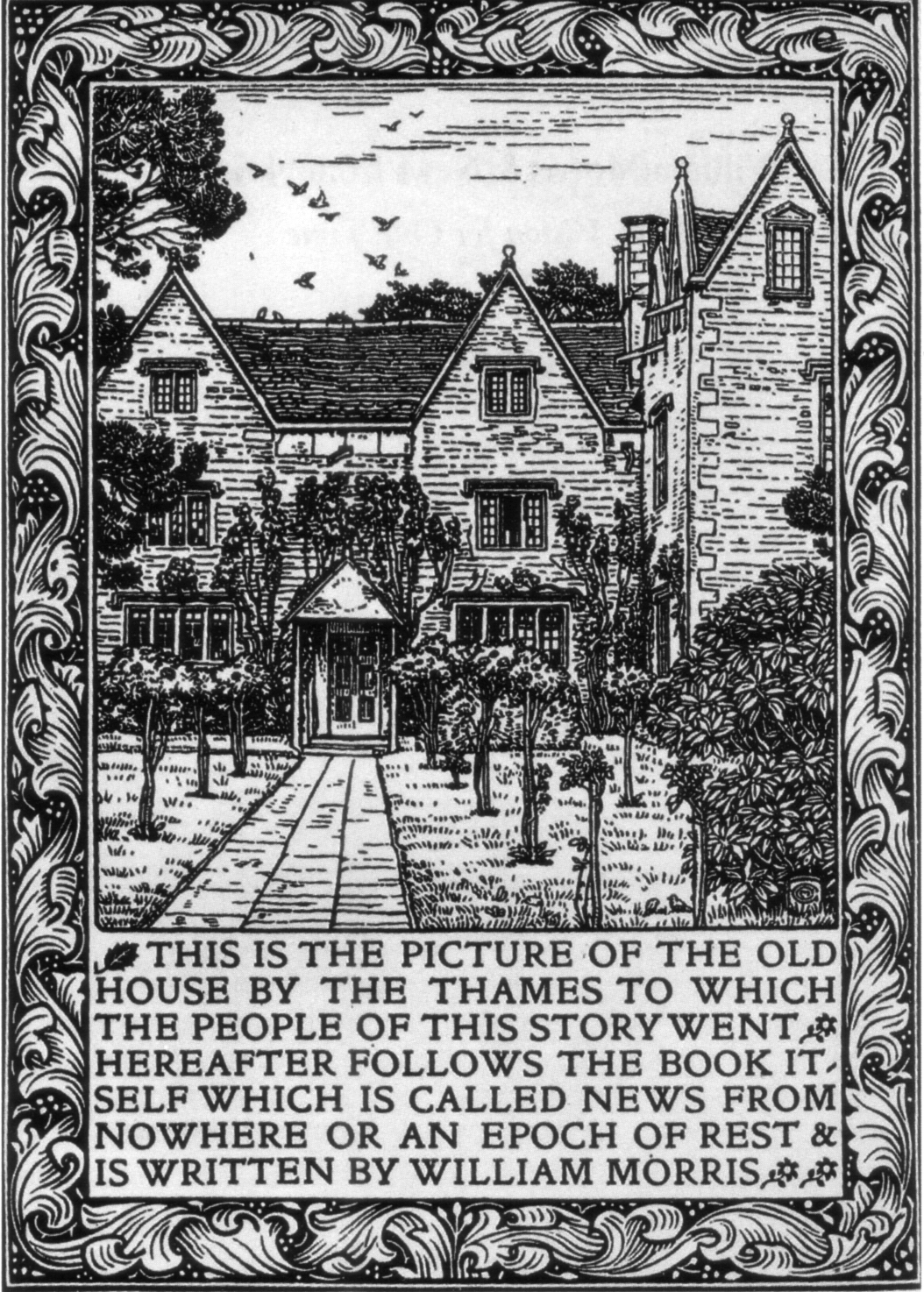
The frontispiece to William Morris's News from Nowhere, designed by Charles March Gere in 1893.

The results of this revolution in art education were far-reaching. Over the course of the 1880s and 1890s the Birmingham School of Art became the focus of a generation of distinguished designers, all of whom had studied there and most of whom went on to teach there, who became known as the Birmingham Group. This included the stained glass designers Henry Payne, Sidney Meteyard, Florence Camm and Bernard Sleigh; the wood engravers and book illustrators E. H. New and Charles March Gere; the jewellers and metalworkers Arthur Dixon, Arthur Gaskin and Georgie Gaskin; and the furniture designers Ernest Barnsley and Sidney Barnsley. The influence of the school's teaching also permeated beyond this inner circle, and important work in an Arts and Crafts style was also produced by organisations such as the Birmingham Guild of Handicraft, the Bromsgrove Guild of Applied Arts, the Kynoch Press and the Ruskin Pottery; and commercial firms such as the silversmiths A. E. Jones, the stained glass workshops of T. W. Camm and Co. and the metalworkers Henry Hope and Son.

The thinking of the Arts and Crafts Movement chimed perfectly with the Civic Gospel ideology of Birmingham's non-conformist and Radical Liberal political elite. While promoting enlightened municipal activism, the Civic Gospel also carried an aesthetic dimension: one of its leaders, H. W. Crosskey, would "excite his audience by dwelling on the glories of Florence and the cities of Italy in the Middle Ages and suggest that Birmingham too might become the home of a noble literature and art" As a result Birmingham's artists and craftsmen would benefit from extensive patronage, as the Arts and Crafts style became the semi-official taste of Birmingham's governing elite.

The work of the artist-craftsmen of Birmingham, which reached a peak of quality around 1900, was both distinctive and original. It was not only marked by the simplicity of technique that was characteristic of the wider Arts and Crafts Movement, but also openly expressed this simplicity in the deliberate primitivism and innocence of its style – "their success as designers lay in what they left off". It was this sense of extreme understatement and almost childlike innocence that contrasted with the sophisticated and symbolically charged Celtic mysticism of the Glasgow style of Charles Rennie Mackintosh – the other distinctive local Arts and Crafts tradition of the time – and lay behind its considerable contemporary reputation and its widespread influence on later modernism.

=== Early modernism ===
The strength of the Arts and Crafts movement within Birmingham formed one of the precursors of early European modernism. Edward R. Taylor's educational developments in Birmingham in the 1880s were a direct influence on William Lethaby's innovations at London's Central School of Arts and Crafts from 1896, which in turn provided the model for the establishment of the Bauhaus by Walter Gropius in 1919. The Dutch architect, furniture designer and De Stijl group founder Robert van 't Hoff studied at the Birmingham School of Art from 1906 to 1911 and worked for Birmingham architect Herbert Tudor Buckland, later also coming under the influence of the Birmingham-born cubist and futurist David Bomberg. Locally too, an Arts and Crafts background was the common feature of many of Birmingham's more progressive and influential designers. The silverware that launched the Cymric line for Liberty & Co. in 1901 – one of the most widely recognized archetypes of Art Nouveau worldwide, and work which resulted in Art Nouveau becoming known as the "Stile Liberty" in continental Europe – was manufactured by the Birmingham silversmiths W. H. Haseler to the designs of local metalwork craftsmen Oliver Baker, Bernard Cuzner and Albert Edward Jones, all of whom were associated with the Vittoria Street School of Jewellery and Silversmithing.

Birmingham was the only area of England in the interwar period to follow the German example in emphasising the importance of design for industrial processes as well as traditional craft-based production, teaching courses in industrial design in metals and plastics at the Birmingham School of Art, and holding an "Exhibition of Midland Industrial Art" at Birmingham Museum and Art Gallery in 1934 that attracted 28,000 visitors. During the 1930s Harry Weedon – whose background lay in designing upmarket Arts and Crafts houses in suburbs such as Four Oaks – oversaw the development of the art deco branding of the Odeon Cinemas for Balsall Heath-born Oscar Deutsch; combining graphics, typography and architecture to create one of the first examples of unashamedly modernist design to successfully enter mainstream English culture. In 1930 the Birmingham lighting designer Robert Dudley Best introduced the Bestlite, the first Bauhaus-inspired product to emerge from England and a rare example of commercially viable English modernist design in the inter-war period.

=== Post-war design ===
Birmingham's designers diversified into new industries in the late 20th century. Challenged to "bring art to an artless industry", A. H. Woodfull laid down many of the ground rules of industrial design in plastics during the early post-war era, producing classic tableware including the Beetleware, Gaydon and Melaware ranges, while the designs of the silversmith and metalware designer Robert Welch for tableware, clocks, candlesticks and other domestic items "helped to define contemporary style" in the 1960s. The Bauhaus-trained Naum Slutzky fled to Birmingham from Nazi Germany in 1933, working with local lighting design firms and teaching product design at the Birmingham School of Art from 1957 to 1964.

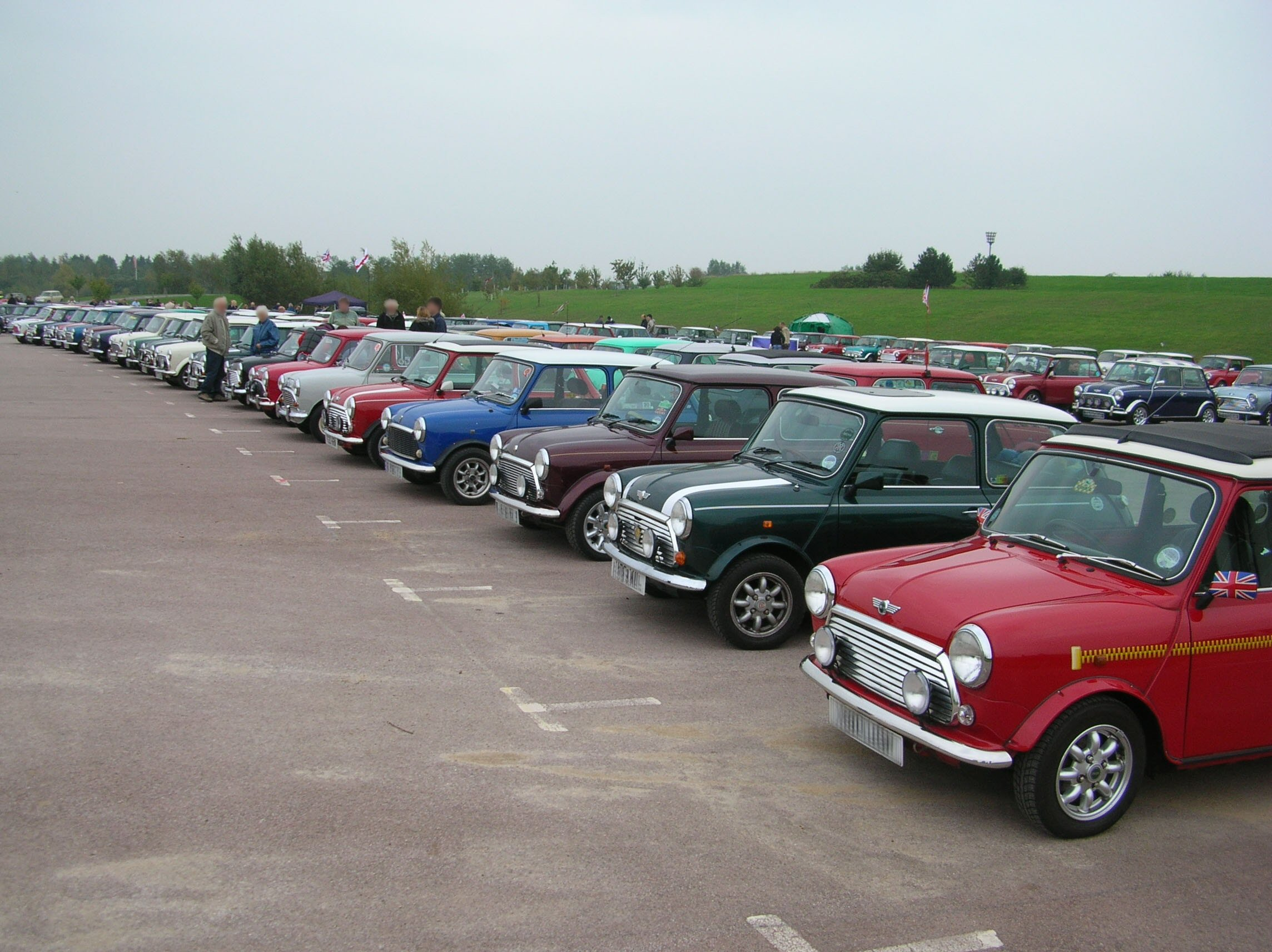
Minis lined up at a rally to celebrate the centenary of their designer Alec Issigonis

During the post-war era Birmingham was particularly influential within automotive design, the field associated with the city's dominant post-war industry. Dick Burzi, who had fled to Birmingham from Mussolini's Italy in the 1920s, transformed the conservative design culture of the Longbridge-based Austin Motor Company in the 1940s and 1950s, designing the "astonishingly extravagant" Austin Atlantic in 1948 and the "delightfully minimal" Austin A30 in 1951. David Bache served an apprenticeship under Burzi at Longbridge before studying at the University of Birmingham and the Birmingham School of Art, and moving in 1954 to the Rover Company in Solihull, where he designed the 1963 Rover P6, in design terms "perhaps the most sophisticated British production car ever". Patrick Le Quement, who was brought up in the city and trained at the Birmingham School of Art in the 1960s, was the stylist for the revolutionary and controversial design of the Ford Sierra of 1982, before leading the resurgence of design at Renault in the 1990s as Head of Design, where his work on models such as the Avantime and the Vel Satis was acclaimed for its "extraordinary aesthetics, a combination of explicit geometry, deliberate asymmetry and imbalance, and a refusal to conform".

The Mini, which was the best-selling car in Europe during the 1960s and remained in production for over 40 years, has been described as the most notable piece of automotive design to emerge from the city. Designed by Alec Issigonis in 1957, it has been called "the design icon of a generation". Attracting celebrity owners including all four Beatles, Steve McQueen and Brigitte Bardot, its influence extended beyond automotive design as it was seen to symbolise Britain in the Swinging Sixties.

== Current art galleries ==
- The Barber Institute of Fine Arts is housed at the University of Birmingham and although only a small gallery it was declared 'Gallery of the Year' by the Good Britain Guide 2004.
- Birmingham has one of the largest collections of Pre-Raphaelite art in the world at The Birmingham Museum & Art Gallery.
- The Ikon Gallery is housed in a neo-Gothic former school in Brindleyplace and showcases modern art.
- The Halcyon Gallery is located inside the International Convention Centre. It opened with a major retrospective of Robert Lenkiewicz, and has continued with exhibitions by artists as diverse as Rolf Harris and L. S. Lowry.
- The Waterhall gallery in the Birmingham Museum & Art Gallery displays a regular showcase of modern art which includes local artists and others sometimes from the city's own extensive collection.
- Harborne Gallery, the Royal Birmingham Society of Artists and the 'New Gallery' in St Paul's square also shows local artists.
- The old Bird's Custard Factory is now one of the largest media and arts villages in Europe, with occasional exhibitions and modern sculpture and water features.
- OOM Gallery Archive collaborates with the private and public art galleries and museums by developing and producing a diverse range of multimedia art projects.
- The mac hosts theatre performances, concerts, literature and poetry showcases, courses, film screenings and small art exhibitions.
- The Drum Arts Centre features works of African, Asian and Caribbean contemporary artists.
- Selly Oak ball park is home to many graffiti murals that change on a regular basis. Other graffiti art can be seen across the city on disused buildings and canal towpaths as well as subways.

There are a variety of other small and private galleries in the city.

== Bibliography and further reading ==
- Berg, Maxine (1991), "Commerce and Creativity in Eighteenth-Century Birmingham", in Berg, Maxine (ed.), Markets and Manufacture in Early Industrial Europe, Routledge, pp. 173–202, ISBN 0-415-03720-4
- Breeze, George (1984), "Decorative Painting: For the Common Good and Beauty of our Towns", in Crawford, Alan (ed.), By Hammer and Hand - The Arts and Crafts Movement in Birmingham, Birmingham: Birmingham Museum and Art Gallery, pp. 61–83, ISBN 978-0-7093-0119-6
- Chang, Lin (2011), Manufacturing landscape: the representation of suburbs, Birmingham 1780-c.1850 (PDF), London: University College London
- Crawford, Alan (1984a), "The Birmingham Setting: A Curious Mixture of Bourgeoisie and Romance", in Crawford, Alan (ed.), By Hammer and Hand: the Arts and Crafts Movement in Birmingham, Birmingham: Birmingham Museums & Art Gallery, pp. 27–40, ISBN 978-0-7093-0119-6
- Crawford, Alan (1984b), "Conclusion: A Famous City of White Stone", in Crawford, Alan (ed.), By Hammer and Hand: the Arts and Crafts Movement in Birmingham, Birmingham: Birmingham Museums & Art Gallery, pp. 129–133, ISBN 0-7093-0119-7
- Fawcett, Trevor (1974), The rise of English provincial art: artists, patrons, and institutions outside London, 1800–1830, Oxford: Clarendon Press, ISBN 978-0-19-817328-1
- Fox, Caroline; Greenacre, Francis (1985), Painting in Newlyn 1880–1930, London: Barbican Art Gallery, ISBN 978-0-946372-10-2
- Gere, Charlotte (1969), The earthly paradise: F. Cayley Robinson, F.L. Griggs, and the painter-craftsmen of the Birmingham Group, London: Fine Art Society, OCLC 13498973
- Gere, Charlotte (April 2005), "Gleams of gold: the Fortunoff collection of paintings by Joseph Southall", Apollo
- Hall, J. Barrie (2002), A Review of the Royal Birmingham Society of Artists, 1821–1999, Birmingham: RBSA Archive
- Hartnell, Roy (1996), Pre-Raphaelite Birmingham, Studley: Brewin Books, ISBN 978-1-85858-064-7
- Heskett, John (1980), Industrial Design, World of Art, London: Thames & Hudson, ISBN 0-500-20181-1
- Hill, Joseph (1971), The Book Makers of Old Birmingham: Authors, Printers, and Book Sellers, New York: B. Franklin, ISBN 0-8337-1706-5
- Hill, Joseph; Midgley, William; Harper, Edward S. (1928), The history of the Royal Birmingham Society of Artists, Birmingham: Cornish Bros., OCLC 3445640
- Holyoak, Joe; Wildman, Stephen; Schroder, Timothy (1996), "Birmingham", in Turner, Jane (ed.), Grove Art Online, Oxford: Oxford University Press
- Jones, Peter M. (2009), Industrial Enlightenment: Science, technology and culture in Birmingham and the West Midlands, 1760–1820, Manchester University Press, ISBN 978-0-7190-7770-8
- Levy, Silvano (2000), "Maddox, the Melvilles and Morris: Birmingham Surrealists", in Sidey, Tessa (ed.), Surrealism in Birmingham 1935–1954, Birmingham: Birmingham Museums & Art Gallery, pp. 23–36, ISBN 978-0-7093-0235-3
- Livingstone, Marco (2000), Pop Art: A Continuing History, London: Thames & Hudson, ISBN 978-0-500-28240-3
- Noszlopy, George T. (1998), Public Sculpture of Birmingham, including Sutton Coldfield, Public Sculpture of Britain, Liverpool: Liverpool University Press, ISBN 978-0-85323-692-4
- Osborne, Victoria (2008), "Cox and Birmingham", in Wilcox, Scott (ed.), Sun, Wind, and Rain: the art of David Cox, New Haven, CT: Yale University Press, pp. 69–83, ISBN 978-0300117448
- Price, Matt (2008), A Hitchhiker' s Guide to the Gallery - Where to see art in Birmingham and the West Midlands (PDF), London: Arts Co, archived from the original (PDF) on 12 April 2019
- Remy, Michel (2000), "Towards the Magnetic North: Surrealism in Birmingham", in Sidey, Tessa (ed.), Surrealism in Birmingham 1935–1954, Birmingham: Birmingham Museums & Art Gallery, pp. 7–14, ISBN 978-0-7093-0235-3
- Remy, Michel (2001), Surrealism in Britain, London: Lund Humphries, ISBN 978-0-85331-825-5
- Sidey, Tessa (2000), "Boogie Woogie on a higher plane: a local context for the Birmingham Surrealists", in Sidey, Tessa (ed.), Surrealism in Birmingham 1935–1954, Birmingham: Birmingham Museums & Art Gallery, pp. 15–22, ISBN 978-0-7093-0235-3
- Swift, John (2005), "Birmingham and its Art School: Changing Views 1800–1921", in Romans, Mervyn (ed.), Histories of Art and Design Education: Collected Essays, Bristol: Intellect Books, pp. 67–90, ISBN 978-1-84150-131-4
- Wildman, Stephen (1990), The Birmingham school: paintings, drawings and prints by Birmingham artists from the permanent collection, Birmingham: Birmingham Museums & Art Gallery, ISBN 978-0-7093-0171-4
