= Joseph Barber (disambiguation) =

Joseph Barber (1757–1811) was an English landscape painter and art teacher.

Joseph Barber may also refer to:

- Dr. Joseph L. Barber (1864–1940), Wisconsin State Senator
- Joseph Vincent Barber (1788–1838), English artist and son of Joseph Barber

== See also ==
- Joseph Barber Lightfoot (1828–1889), English theologian and Bishop of Durham
