= Henry Payne (artist) =

British stained glass artist, watercolourist and painter of frescoes

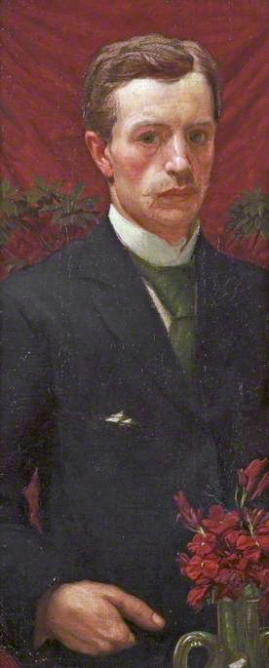
- Self portrait (circa 1890)
- Born: 1868; Kings Heath, Birmingham, England
- Died: 4 July 1940 (aged 71–72)
- Education: Birmingham School of Art, also under Christopher Whall
- Known for: Stained glass

Henry Albert Payne RWS, also known as "Henry Arthur Payne", (1868 – 4 July 1940) was a British stained glass artist, watercolourist and painter of frescoes.

Payne was one of the Birmingham Group of Artist-Craftsmen who formed around Joseph Southall and the Birmingham School of Art in the late nineteenth century. He was involved in several of the group's collective projects, most notably the decoration of the chapel at Madresfield Court, which numbers among the seminal achievements of the Arts and Crafts movement.

== Early years and studies ==
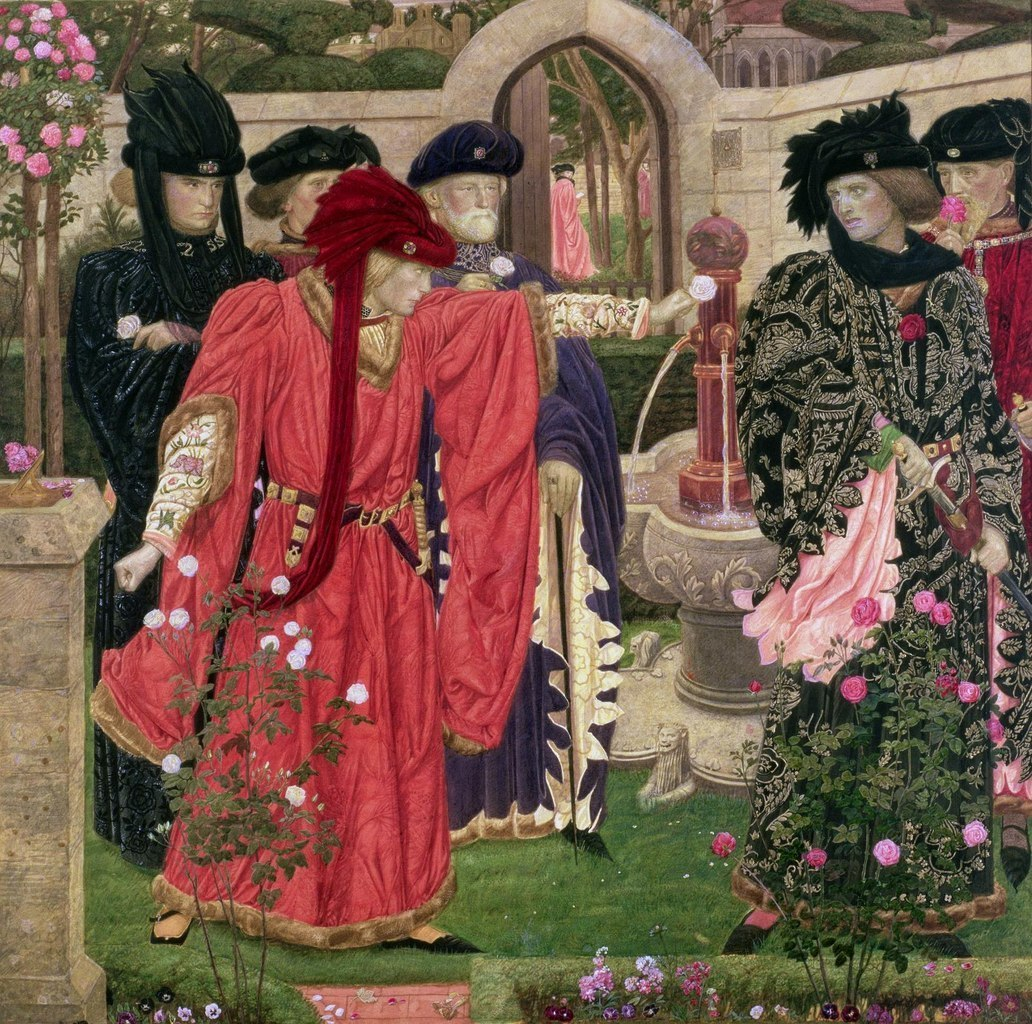
Choosing the Red and White Roses in the Temple Garden (1908–10), pen and watercolour, gouache, gold-leaf and oil.

Born in the King's Heath area of Birmingham, Payne studied under Edward R. Taylor at the Birmingham School of Art, where he was one of the students commissioned to paint a series of murals under Taylor's supervision for the redecoration of Birmingham Town Hall - the first "outward and visible sign of the rise to fame and importance of the Birmingham School".

== Birmingham School educator ==
In 1899, Payne was appointed to the School's staff, initially as a teacher of drawing and painting, but increasingly concentrating through the 1890s on the design of stained glass. In 1900, he installed a glass kiln at the school and studied stained glass manufacture in London under Christopher Whall so that, in the Arts and Crafts tradition, design and manufacture could be taught as an integrated process. Among his outstanding students were Margaret Agnes Rope and Archibald John Davies.

== Stained glass and painting ==
From at least 1904 onwards, he established an independent business designing and manufacturing stained glass, producing large and notable works for churches such as E. S. Prior's St Andrew's, Roker, St Martin's, Kensal Rise, St Mary's, Madresfield and J. L. Pearson's St Alban's, Bordesley.

In common with most of the Birmingham Group he worked across a wide variety of media, producing book illustrations for the Birmingham Guild of Handicraft and interior decoration for the Bromsgrove Guild of Applied Arts. Although most prolific in stained glass, Payne's most notable achievements were arguably in the field of decorative painting. Between 1902 and 1923 he worked on the wall paintings of the chapel at Madresfield Court near Malvern in Worcestershire. Painted as fresco in tempera and sitting alongside work by other figures of the Birmingham Arts and Crafts movement such as William Bidlake, Georgie Gaskin and Charles March Gere, Madresfield Court is "not only Payne's most important scheme of decorative painting, but probably the most famous of all such Arts and Crafts schemes."

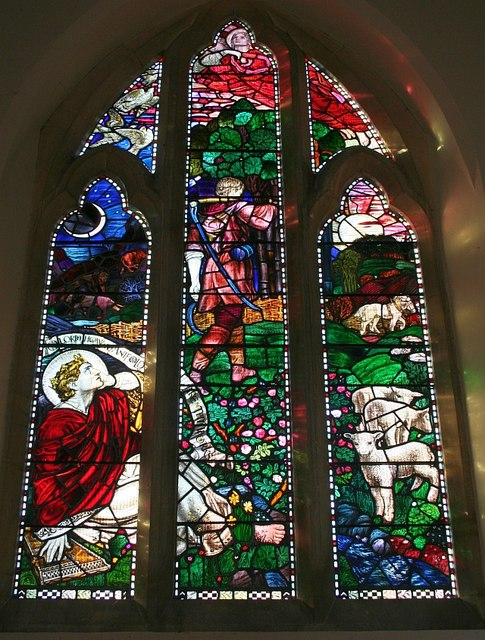
West Window, Hook Church: The "Good Shepherd" window by Henry Payne. A mix of a typical English country scene, with lambs and a stream, but with lions behind the wicker fence and a biblical king complete with what appears to be a zither.

In 1908, he was commissioned to produce a wall painting for the later stages of the decoration of the Palace of Westminster. His work Plucking the Red and White Roses in the Old Temple Gardens - an allegory on the Wars of the Roses - now hangs in the Palace's East Corridor.

Payne also painted landscapes in watercolour, exhibiting at the Royal Academy from 1899 to 1935 and being elected a member of the Royal Watercolour Society in 1920.

== St Loe's Guild ==
In Amberley, Payne continued producing work in fresco and stained glass, and in 1912 established St Loe's Guild, initially modelled in the Arts and Crafts tradition on the Bromsgrove Guild, though ultimately little more than a vehicle for his own works.

== Personal life ==
In 1909, Payne and his family moved to Amberley in Gloucestershire, one of several significant Arts and Crafts figures to move to the Cotswolds.
