= J. B. Lightfoot =

British bishop and scholar of early Christianity (1828–1889)

The Right Reverend Joseph Lightfoot
- Bishop of Durham
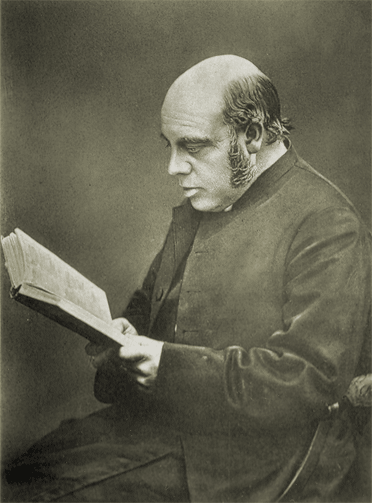
- Diocese: Durham
- Elected: 15 March 1879
- In office: 10 April 1879 (conf.)– 1889 (died)
- Predecessor: Charles Baring
- Successor: Brooke Foss Westcott
- Other posts: Hulsean Professor of Divinity (1861–1875); Lady Margaret's Professor of Divinity (1875–1879); Deputy Clerk of the Closet (1875–?)

Personal details
- Born: 13 April 1828 Liverpool, Lancashire, United Kingdom
- Died: 21 December 1889 (aged 61) Bournemouth, Hampshire, UK
- Buried: Auckland Castle chapel
- Denomination: Anglican
- Residence: Auckland Castle (as Bishop of Durham)
- Parents: John Lightfoot & Ann Lightfoot (née Barber)
- Spouse: never married
- Profession: academic; biblical scholar; bible translator; theologian; tutor
- Education: King Edward's School, Birmingham
- Alma mater: Trinity College, Cambridge

Ordination history of J. B. Lightfoot
History
Diaconal ordination
- Ordained by: James Prince Lee, Bishop of Manchester
- Date: 1854
Priestly ordination
- Ordained by: Prince Lee
- Date: 1858
Episcopal consecration
- Principal consecrator: William Thomson, Archbishop of York
- Co-consecrators: 7 others
- Date: 25 April 1879
- Place: Westminster Abbey

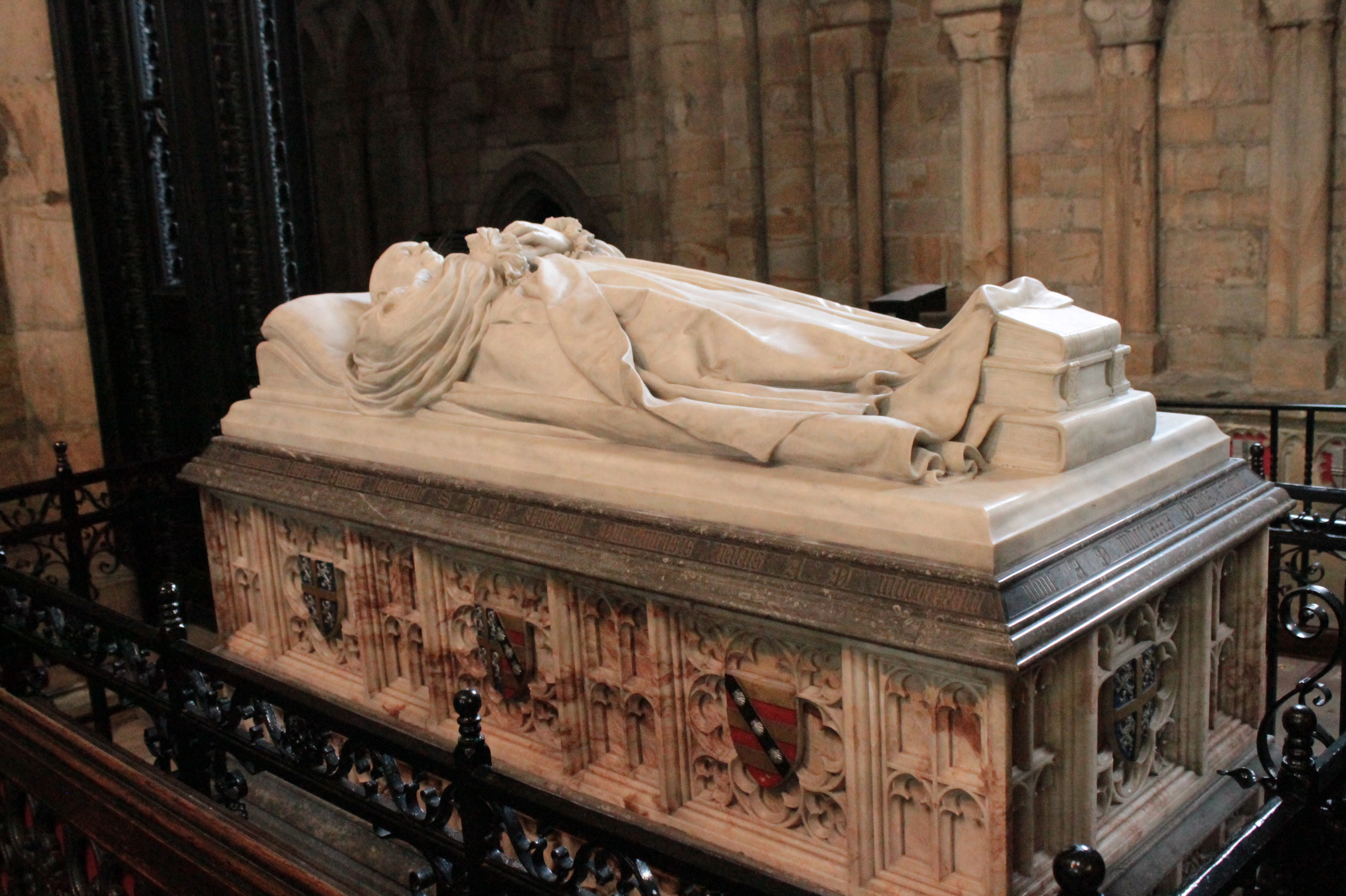
The grave of Bishop Joseph Barber Lightfoot, Durham Cathedral

Joseph Barber Lightfoot (13 April 1828 – 21 December 1889) was an English Anglican theologian who served as Bishop of Durham.

== Life ==
Lightfoot was born in Liverpool, where his father John Jackson Lightfoot was an accountant. His mother, Ann Matilda Barber, was from a family of Birmingham artists. He was educated at King Edward's School, Birmingham, under James Prince Lee. His contemporaries included Brooke Foss Westcott and Edward White Benson. In 1847, Lightfoot went to Trinity College, Cambridge, and read for his degree along with Westcott. He graduated senior classic and 30th wrangler, and was elected a fellow of his college. From 1854 to 1859 he edited the Journal of Classical and Sacred Philology. In 1857, he became tutor and his fame as a scholar grew. He was made Hulsean professor in 1861, and shortly afterwards chaplain to the Prince Consort and honorary chaplain in ordinary to Queen Victoria.

In 1866, he was Whitehall preacher, and in 1871 he became canon of St Paul's Cathedral. The Times wrote after his death that

It was always patent that what he was chiefly concerned with was the substance and the life of Christian truth, and that his whole energies were employed in this inquiry because his whole heart was engaged in the truths and facts which were at stake.

In 1875, Lightfoot became Lady Margaret's Professor of Divinity in succession to William Selwyn. In 1879, he was consecrated bishop of Durham in succession to Charles Baring; he was enthroned at Durham Cathedral on 15 May. He soon surrounded himself with a band of scholarly young men.

Lightfoot was never married. He died at Bournemouth and was succeeded in the episcopate by Westcott, his schoolfellow and lifelong friend. He served as President of the first day of the 1880 Co-operative Congress.

He is buried in Auckland Castle Chapel, with a memorial in Durham Cathedral close to the choir stalls.

== Work ==
Lightfoot wrote commentaries on the Epistle to the Galatians (1865), Epistle to Philippians (1868) and Epistle to the Colossians (1875). In 1874, the anonymous publication of Supernatural Religion, a skeptical work by Walter Richard Cassels, attracted much attention. In a series of rebuttals published in the Contemporary Review, between December 1874 and May 1877, Lightfoot undertook the defense of the New Testament canon. The articles were published in collected form in 1889. About the same time he was engaged in contributions to William Smith's Dictionary of Christian Biography and Dictionary of the Bible, and he also joined the committee for revising the translation of the New Testament.

The corpus of Lightfoot's writings include essays on biblical and historical subject matter, commentaries on Pauline epistles, and studies on the Apostolic Fathers. His sermons were posthumously published in four official volumes, and additionally in the Contemporary Pulpit Library series. At Durham he continued to work at his editions of the Apostolic Fathers, and in 1885 published an edition of the Epistles of Ignatius and Polycarp, collecting also materials for a second edition of Clement of Rome, which was published after his death (1st edition, 1869). He defended the authenticity of the Epistles of Ignatius.

Lightfoot had said that he was open to the idea of a diaconate that included women and in 1899 Emily Marshall wrote A Suggestion for our Times on this theme. Marshall said she was told by Lightfoot to give her idea of training women in his diocese, to take on this role, "a practical form". Lightfoot's death resulted in her idea being shut down. Marshall created a new religious order within the church based on Lightfoot's discussion of the Third Order of Saint Francis who had historically consisted of men and women who did not live in monasteries or wear cowls. Marshall however regretted that Lightfoot's diaconate idea had been lost due to his death.

In 2014, it was announced that InterVarsity Press had agreed to publish about 1500 pages of previously unpublished biblical commentaries and essays by Lightfoot found in Durham Cathedral. The first of the three volume set covers the Acts of the Apostles, the second is a commentary on the Gospel of John and the third is on the Second Epistle to the Corinthians and the First Epistle of Peter.

== Family ==
Lightfoot was the nephew of the artists Joseph Vincent Barber and Charles Vincent Barber and grandson of the artist and founding member of the Birmingham School of Art, Joseph Barber and great-grandson of the founder of Newcastle's first library, Joseph Barber, whose tomb is in Newcastle Cathedral.

== Bibliography ==
- Apostolic Fathers. Part I. (two vols). London: MacMillan and Co. 1890.
- Apostolic Fathers. Part II. (three vols). London: MacMillan and Co. 1885–89.
- Apostolic Fathers Abridged. London: MacMillan and Co. 1891.
- Biblical Essays. London: MacMillan and Co. 1893.
- Cambridge Sermons. London: MacMillan and Co. 1890.
- Dissertations on the Apostolic Age. London: MacMillan and Co. 1892.
- Essays on Supernatural Religion. London: MacMillan and Co. 1889.
- Fresh Revision of the English New Testament. London: MacMillan and Co. 1871.
- Leaders in the Northern Church. London: MacMillan and Co. 1890.
- Historical Essays. London: MacMillan and Co. 1895.
- Notes on the Epistles of St. Paul from Unpublished Commentaries. London: MacMillan and Co. 1895.
- Ordination Addresses. London: MacMillan and Co. 1890.
- Primary Charge. London: MacMillan and Co. 1882.
- St. Clement of Rome. London: MacMillan and Co. 1869.
- Saint Paul's Epistle to the Galatians. London: MacMillan and Co. 1865.
- Saint Paul's Epistles to the Colossians and Philemon. London: MacMillan and Co. 1875.
- Saint Paul's Epistle to the Philippians. London: MacMillan and Co. 1868.
- The Christian Ministry. 1868.
- Sermons preached in St. Paul's. London: MacMillan and Co. 1891.
- Special Sermons. London: MacMillan and Co. 1891.
- The Contemporary Pulpit Library: Sermons by Bishop Lightfoot. London: Swan Sonnenschein. 1892.

== Sources ==
- Treloar, Geoffrey R. (1998). Lightfoot the Historian: The Nature and Role of History in the Life and Thought of J.B. Lightfoot (1828–1889) as Churchman and Scholar. Mohr Siebeck. ISBN 978-3-16-146866-7.
- McIntire, C.T. (2001). "Review of Lightfoot the Historian". Anglican and Episcopal History. 70 (2): 254–256. ISSN 0896-8039. JSTOR 42612184.
- Hort, Fenton John Anthony (1893). "Lightfoot, Joseph Barber" . In Lee, Sidney (ed.). Dictionary of National Biography. Vol. 33. London: Smith, Elder & Co.
- Barrett, C. K. "Lightfoot, Joseph Barber (1828–1889)". Oxford Dictionary of National Biography (online ed.). Oxford University Press. doi:10.1093/ref:odnb/16650. (Subscription, Wikipedia Library access or UK public library membership required.)
- Chrystal, Paul; Laundon, Stan (2015). Secret Newcastle. Amberley. ISBN 978-1-4456-4139-3.

Church of England titles
Preceded by Charles Baring	Bishop of Durham; 1879–1889	Succeeded by Brooke Foss Westcott
