= Birmingham School (engravers) =

The Birmingham School of engravers emerged from the early Birmingham drawing academies of Joseph Barber and Samuel Lines in the early 19th century. By the 1850s and 1860s they were dominant figures in the art of line-engraving.

The Birmingham engravers enabled the expansion of the scope of illustrated books and magazines to include the works of artists such as J. M. W. Turner, greatly increasing the exposure of contemporary art.

== Members ==
The existence of the Birmingham School as a distinctive group within the wider field of engraving was first recognised with the Exhibition of Engravings by Birmingham Men held at the Royal Birmingham Society of Artists in 1877. This exhibition featured work by the following engravers:

- James Baylie Allen
- Robert Brandard
- J. Goodyear
- William Radclyffe
- C. W. Sharp
- James Tibbets Willmore
- E. P. Brandard
- John Pye
- Thomas Garner
- J. Jeavons
- E. Radclyffe
- A. Willmore
- William Floyd
- S. Fisher
