= Birmingham School =

Birmingham School may refer to:

== Schools of thought ==
- The Birmingham School (cultural studies), associated with the Centre for Contemporary Cultural Studies
- Birmingham School (economics), 19th century underconsumptionist economists led by Thomas Attwood
- The style associated with the artists of the Birmingham Group (artists)
- Birmingham School (landscape artists), 18th and 19th century landscape artists
- Birmingham School (engravers), 19th century line-engravers

== Educational institutions ==
- Birmingham Business School
- Royal Birmingham Conservatoire, formerly the Birmingham School of Music
- Birmingham Medical School
- Birmingham School of Art
