= Thomas Garner (engraver) =

British engraver

Thomas Garner (1789–1868) was a British engraver, best known for engraving plates for The Art Journal.

== Life ==
Garner, born at Birmingham in 1789, received instruction in the art of engraving from Samuel Lines. He lived in Birmingham nearly all his life and was an active promoter of the study of art in Birmingham. He was also one of the founders of the Antique Academy there, later known as the Royal Birmingham Society of Artists.

Garner was of a modest and unassuming disposition and so was little known, but he was very much esteemed for his cultivated knowledge and artistic skill. He died at Birmingham on 14 July 1868.

As an engraver, Garner did some of his best work for the annuals then in vogue, and also in subjects of local interest and portraits of local celebrities.

== Plates for The Art Journal ==
- the Mountaineer, after P. F. Poole, R.A.
- the Grecian Vintage, after T. Stothard, R.A.
- L'Allegro, after W. E. Frost, R.A.
- Il Penseroso after J. C. Horsley, R. A.
- Chastity, after W. E. Frost, R.A.
- H.R.H. Princess Charlotte, after Sir Thomas Lawrence, P.R.A.
- the Village Diorama, after T. Webster, R.A.
