= Plucking the Red and White Roses in the Old Temple Gardens =

1910 painting by Henry Payne

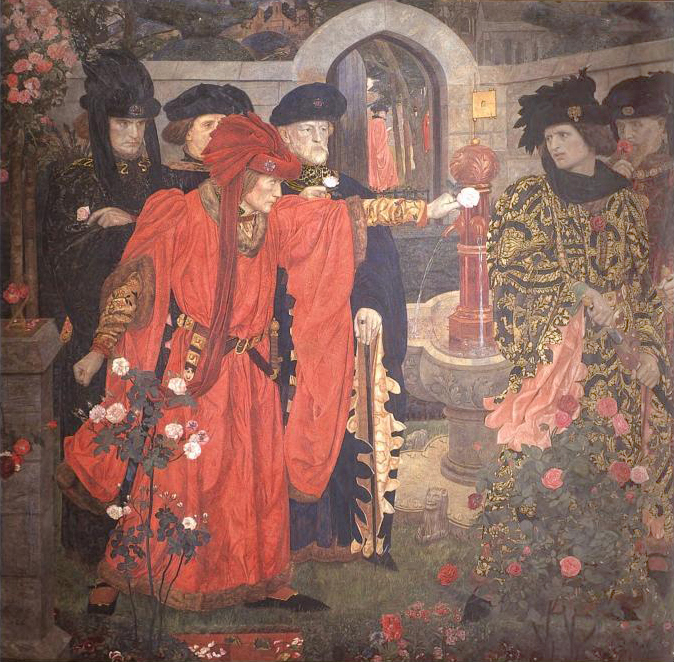
- Artist: Henry Albert Payne
- Year: 1910
- Type: Oil on canvas
- Dimensions: 83 x 81 cm
- Location: Palace of Westminster, London

Plucking the Red and White Roses in the Old Temple Gardens is a 1910 oil painting by Henry Payne. It was commissioned in 1908 to decorate the Palace of Westminster, in whose collection it remains, together with a study for the painting.

It depicts the fictional scene by Shakespeare, from his play Henry VI, Part 1, of Edmund Beaufort, 2nd Duke of Somerset being challenged by Richard of York, 3rd Duke of York to choose between the White Rose of York and the Red Rose of Lancaster.

A gouache painting by Payne, "Choosing The Red and White Roses in the Temple Garden" is in the collection of the Birmingham Museum and Art Gallery.

The "Temple Gardens" of the title are the gardens of the Inner Temple in London.
