= Henry Martin Pope =

- Born: 1843; Birmingham
- Died: 8 February 1908 (aged 64–65)
- Occupation: Painter, lithographer, art educator

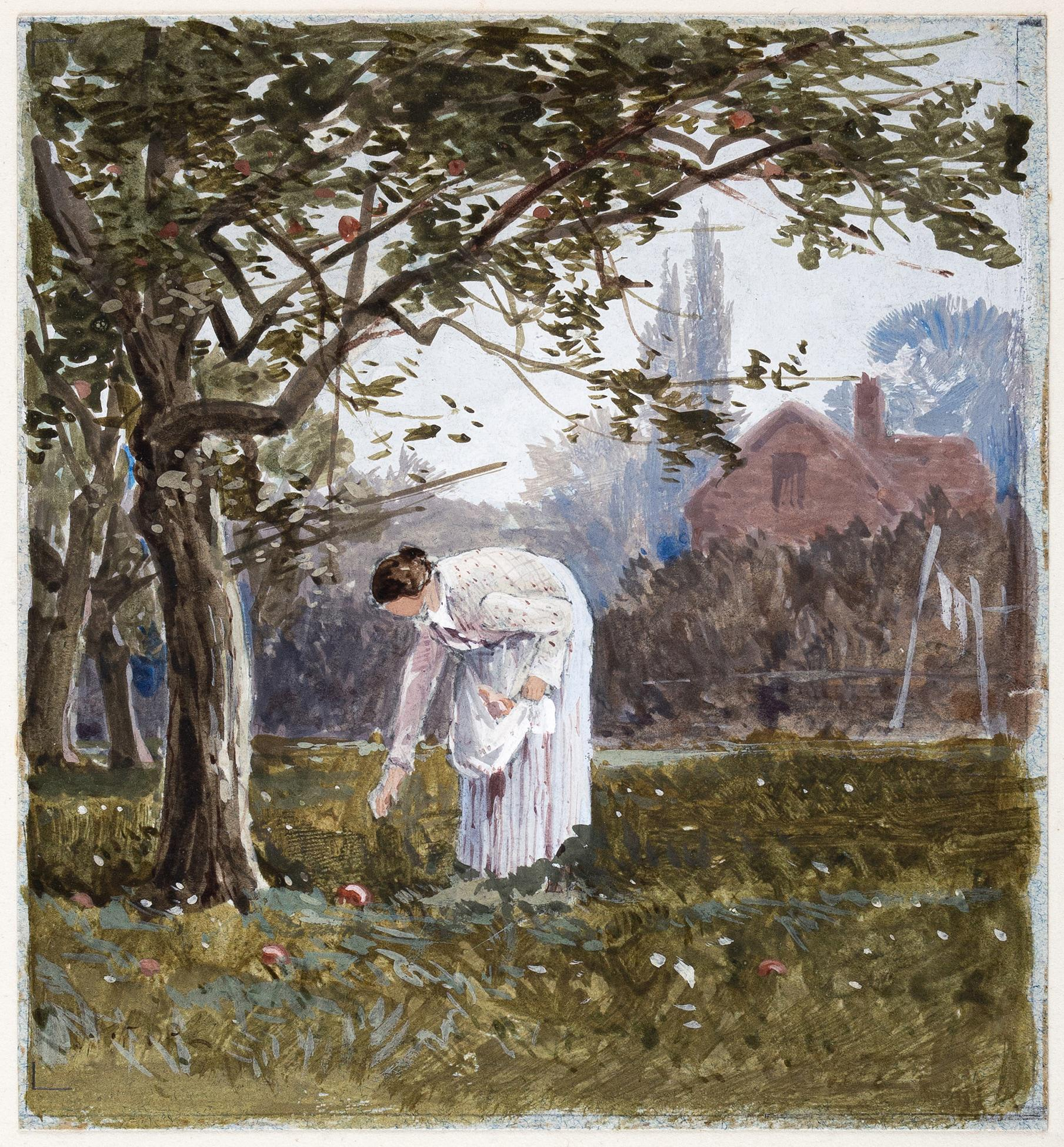
Collecting Apples (watercolour and gouache)

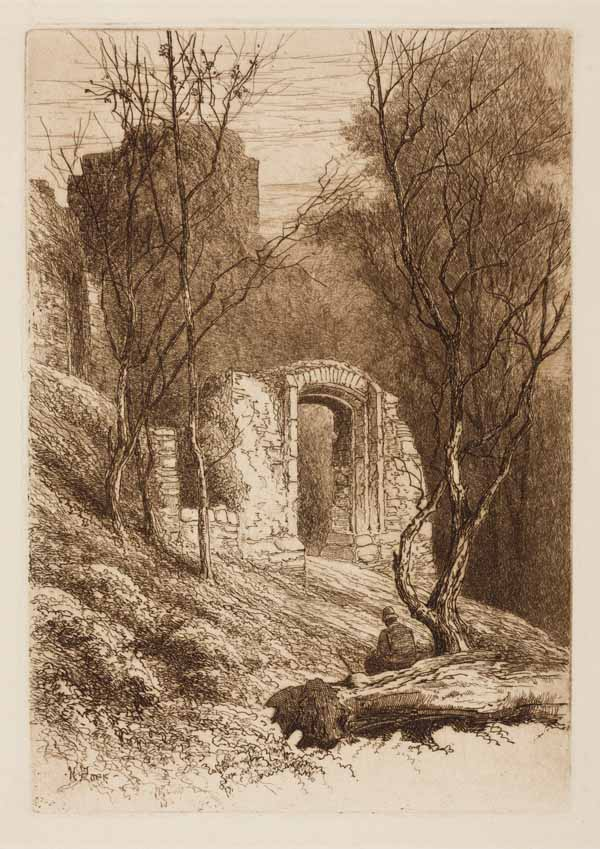
One of Pope's series of 24 etchings of Dudley Castle and Dudley Priory

Henry Martin Pope (1843-1908) was an English painter, engraver and art teacher, known primarily for landscapes, which he painted in oil or watercolour.

Pope was born in 1843 in Birmingham, England. He trained as a lithographer and was taught painting by Samuel Lines. He was a founder, with Walter Langley and others, of the Birmingham Art Circle and taught art in the city. (Note: Birmingham became a city in 1889; prior to that it was an incorporated town with borough status.) He served for eleven years as president of the Clarendon Art Fellowship. He visited Newlyn with Langley from 1880.

His works are in the collections of Birmingham Museums Trust, the Herbert Art Gallery and Museum, y Gaer and Dudley Museums. He exhibited with the Birmingham Art Circle and at the Royal Birmingham Society of Artists.

He died on 8 February 1908.
