= Margaret Gere =

British artist

- Born: August 23, 1878; Leamington Spa, United Kingdom
- Died: 1965 (aged 86–87)
- Known for: Painting

Margaret Gere (23 August 1878 – 1965) was a British artist born in Leamington Spa.

Gere studied at the Birmingham School of Art during the 1890s under her brother, painter Charles March Gere. Later in life, she would accompany him on painting trips aboard. From 1900 she studied Italian painting in Florence. In 1905 she enrolled at the Slade School of Art, where she became friends with both Virginia Woolf and Ethel Walker. Gere exhibited works at the New English Art Club, and had solo shows at galleries including the Cotswold Gallery (1922) and the Beaux Arts Gallery (1929). A retrospective was held at Cheltenham Art Gallery in 1984.

Works by Gere include Noah's Ark, The Garden of the Slothful and What's for Pudding Today?.
