= Albert Edward Jones =

English silversmith and designer (1878 - 1954)

- Born: 1878; England
- Died: 1954 (aged 75–76)
- Occupations: Silversmith, designer

Albert Edward Jones (1878–1954) was an English silversmith and designer.

Jones trained at the Birmingham School of Art under Edward R. Taylor and was for a period a Guildsman of the Birmingham Guild of Handicraft. He founded A. E. Jones & Co. in 1902. Although best known for hallmarked silver, the firm also produced notable work in bronze, copper and brass.
