= Birmingham Guild of Handicraft =

Former art organization in Birmingham, England

Coordinates: 52.482745°N 1.902550°W

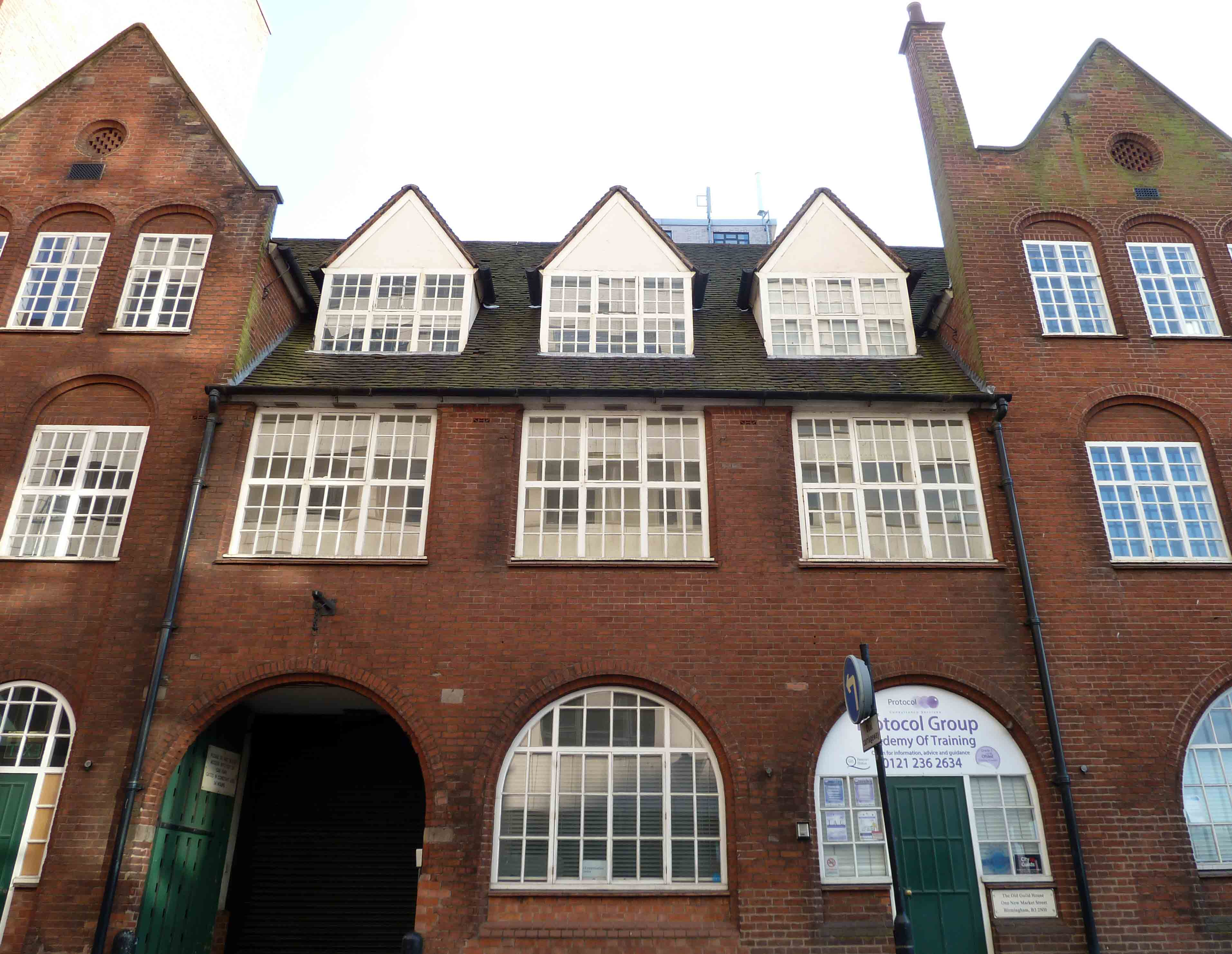
The Guild's headquarters in Great Charles Street, Birmingham, designed by Arthur Stansfield Dixon in 1898

Birmingham Guild of Handicraft was an Arts and Crafts organisation operating in Birmingham, England, established at the end of the 19th century.

== History ==
The Guild began as a loose part of the Birmingham Kyrle Society, then became a more fully formed group within the Kyrle Society in 1890, under the leadership of the silversmith and architect Arthur Stansfeld Dixon (1856–1929) and with the lawyer Montague Fordham as first director, in Vittoria Street School for jewellers and silversmiths, Hockley. It was modelled on Charles Robert Ashbee's London-based Guild and School of Handicraft, founded in 1888, but like that body found itself in financial difficulties owing to high running costs and a lack of money-making ventures.

In 1895, the Guild set up as an independent workshop and limited company under the guidance of Edward R. Taylor, who was an important figure in the history of Birmingham School of Art. William Kenrick, the local MP and an Arts and Crafts enthusiast, became a director. The Guild's first address was at Kyrle Hall, Sheep Street, the same studios later being taken over by John Paul Cooper. In 1898, the Guild moved to 44–5 Great Charles Street. The Guild produced furniture and metalware, taking particular advantage of the switch to electric lighting and the consequent need for new light fittings. Arthur Dixon was the chief designer and head of the metalwork workshop. Other members were Albert Edward Jones and Thomas Birkett. Bernard Sleigh was a teacher at the Guild.

The Guild ran a London showroom, headed by Martin Muir, at 7 Newman Street, Oxford Square.

Under commercial pressure, the Guild merged with E. & R. Gittins in 1905, which brought Llewelyn Roberts into the organisation. In 1919, there was a further merger with Hart, Son & Peard. The name was still shown in directories until 1950 as "The Birmingham Guild Ltd., Architectural & Decorative Metalworkers", the addresses being Grosvenor Road West and Sherbourne St., B16.

== Publications ==
The Guild also published fine books under the imprint of the "Press of the Birmingham Guild of Handicraft, Limited"; and a periodical titled The Quest. The Quest began in November 1894 and aimed to appear three times a year, but was short-lived. William Morris was a contributor. Those involved with the press were Ernest Treglown, Arthur Gaskin, and Charles March Gere. Charles Carr and Mary Newill were book illustrators for the Guild. The press was still active in 1919, when it published Memorials: The Work of the Architect and Craftsman in the Design and Execution of War Memorials.

== Motto ==
The Guild's motto was "By Hammer and Hand".
