= George T. Noszlopy =

Hungarian-British art historian

- Born: Noszlopy György Tomasz; 29 November 1932; Budapest, Hungary
- Died: 5 June 2011 (aged 78)
- Education: Eötvös Loránd University; Courtauld Institute of Art
- Occupation: Art historian

George Thomas Noszlopy (born Noszlopy György Tomasz; 29 November 1932 – 5 June 2011) was a Hungarian-British art historian. Based in England from the 1950s, and the author of several books on the public sculpture of the English Midlands.

Noszlopy was born in Budapest, Hungary, where his father and grandfather were bakers. He graduated with a degree in museology (art history and subsidiary subjects) from Eötvös Loránd University in 1956. In October 1956, he was elected to the Revolutionary Committee of the Hungarian Artists' Association, but was arrested shortly after the second Soviet military intervention, the same year. He fled Hungary and lived briefly in Vienna and Paris, then settled in London.

In 1960, after three years study at the Courtauld Institute, he became a teacher at Coventry College of Art, soon moving to Birmingham College of Art. He became a British citizen in 1962. In 1991, following the fall of communism, Eötvös Loránd University awarded him a DPhil summa cum laude. He was a foundation member of the Association of Art Historians.

Adrian Hicken, a professor at Bath Spa University, said in an obituary that Noszlopy had "made notable contributions to the teaching and dissemination of art history in England for almost fifty years".

At the time of his sudden death at the age 78, Noszlopy was Emeritus Professor and Senior Research Fellow at Birmingham City University's Institute of Art and Design.

== Bibliography ==
- Monograph on the painter Bryan Pearce, 1964
- Note on West’s Apotheosis of Nelson
- Public Sculpture of Britain
  - —— (1998). Public Sculpture of Birmingham. Jeremy Beach (ed.) (Illustrated ed.). Liverpool University Press. ISBN 0853236925.
  - —— (2003). Public sculpture of Warwickshire, Coventry and Solihull. Liverpool University Press. ISBN 9780853238478.
  - —— (2010). Public Sculpture of Staffordshire and the Black Country (First ed.). Liverpool University Press. ISBN 978-0853239895.
  - ——; Fiona Waterhouse (2010). Public Sculpture of Herefordshire, Shropshire and Worcestershire. Liverpool University Press. ISBN 978-1846311727.
- ——; Fiona Waterhouse (2008). Birmingham Public Sculpture Trails. Liverpool University Press. ISBN 978-1846311345.
