= Ruskin Galleries =

Art gallery in Birmingham, England

Coordinates: 52.4800°N 1.9042°W

The Ruskin Galleries was a private art gallery located in what is now Chamberlain Square in Birmingham, England between 1925 and 1940. It provided a venue for the exhibition of modern art at a time when Birmingham's other major artistic institutions were marked by a high degree of artistic conservativism.

Birmingham had been at the forefront of the emergence of several radical art movements in the 19th century, but during the early 20th century the city was largely resistant to emergining modernist trends in the visual arts. In 1917 the Royal Birmingham Society of Artists hosted an exhibition of Post-Impressionist works curated by Roger Fry, but it met a hostile reception, with a review in the Birmingham Post condemning its works for their "puerile insanities" and "the unbelievable squalor of their production". An editorial in the Birmingham Post in 1925 asked "Why is it that Birmingham has ceased to count as an important centre of Art?", criticising the RBSA as being controlled by "a small group of men who have arrogated to themselves the responsibility for deciding what is and isn't art ... entirely out of sympathy with modern movements .... having stood still for at least twenty years"

The Ruskin Galleries were opened by John Gibbins in 1925 and exhibited work both by local artists and by artists from the international avant-garde. One of the first exhibitions put on by the gallery included works by Matisse, Bonnard and Vlaminck. In 1928 it hosted a nationally groundbreaking exhibition of contemporary Russian artists, featuring 70 paintings by 15 artists including Filipp Malyavin, Konstantin Korovin, Natalia Goncharova, Mikhail Larionov.

During the 1920s and 1930s it provided a venue for the local Artist-Craftsmen Group, which evolved into the Modern Group, providing an outlet for the emergence of progressive Birmingham artists such as the sculptors Gordon Herickx and Alan Bridgwater. The galleries hosted a one-man show by Joseph Southall in 1927.

The gallery's immediate impact was noted in the national press in 1926: "when Birmingham seemed hopeless and the modernists felt like exiles in the desert, a miracle happened .... Mr Gibbons has almost revolutionised the artistic life of Birmingham".

Although its founder John Gibbons died in 1932 the gallery continued to present exhibitions by local and international artists throughout the 1930s and remained open until 1940, when it was closed due to the onset of the Second World War. In November of that year the Birmingham Mail reviewed its influence: "For over a dozen years it has been an institution in the cultural life of Birmingham where contemporary art has been displayed and modern craftsmanship exhibited in greater variety than anywhere else ... more than one painter may be said to have been discovered there."

== Bibliography ==
- Hall, J. Barrie (2002), A Review of the Royal Birmingham Society of Artists, 1821-1999, Birmingham: RBSA Archive
