= Vincent Barber =

English painter

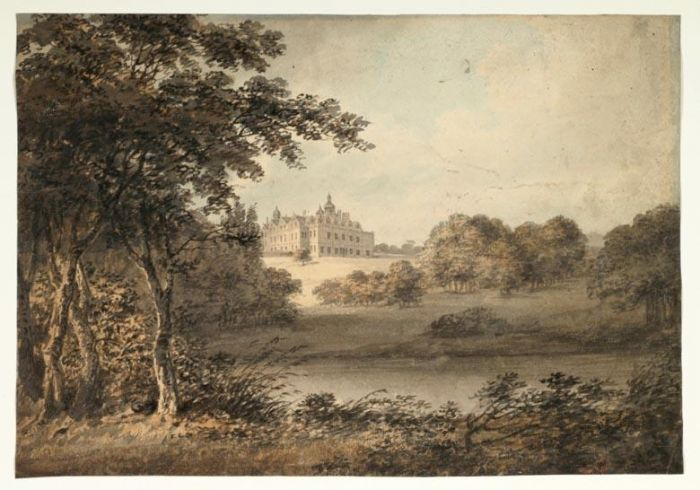
J. Vincent Barber, View of Aston Hall from the Staffordshire Pool (ca. 1808–1838), Watercolour.

Joseph Vincent Barber (1788–1838), known as Vincent Barber, was an English landscape painter and art teacher.

Born in Birmingham, the son of artist and drawing master Joseph Barber, he took over the running of his father's drawing academy in Great Charles Street on the elder Barber's death in 1811. Vincent Barber's students at the academy included Thomas Creswick, James Tibbits Willmore, Thomas Baker and Peter Hollins.

In 1809 he formed a separate academy of life drawing, with his brother Charles Barber and his father's former pupil Samuel Lines, that would ultimately evolve into the Royal Birmingham Society of Artists and Birmingham School of Art.

Barber painted mainly landscapes, which he exhibited at the Royal Academy between 1812 and 1830. He retired in 1837 and travelled to Italy, dying of malaria in Rome in 1838.
