= Temper (artist) =

UK-based graffiti artist

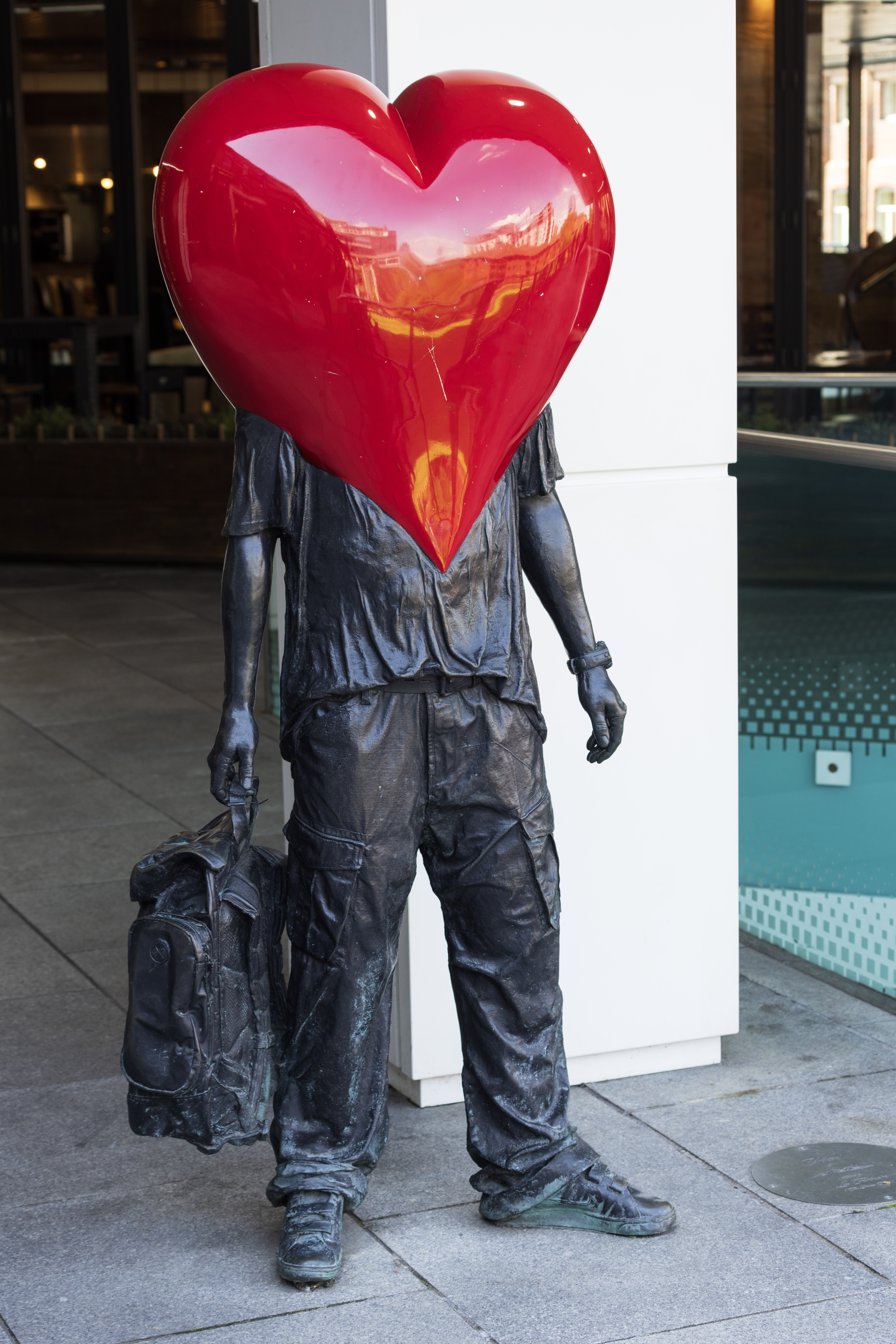
- Urban from The Lovely People Public Art sculptures by Temper at The Cube, Birmingham.
- Born: Arron Bird; Wolverhampton, England
- Movement: Graffiti

Arron Bird, who goes by the name Temper, is an English graffiti artist from Wolverhampton. In 2009, Temper was given the High Sheriff Award by the High Sheriff of the West Midlands Paul Bassi for his contributions to art and community in a ceremony at the Birmingham Botanical Gardens in Edgbaston, Birmingham.

== Works ==
Temper's 2001 exhibition "Minuteman" at the Birmingham Museum and Art Gallery was the first solo exhibition by a graffiti artist in a public gallery.

In 2001, he was commissioned by Coca-Cola to design a unique Sprite can, which was distributed throughout the UK and in parts of Europe.

"A New Day" from 2002 is a collection of 24 artworks of nude figures, which represents the 24-hour day cycle.

"The Good Die Young" is a collection of 27 black-and-white portraits of various public figures who faced an early death.

"Post Graphaelite" is a collection of 12 large portraits representing the different zodiac signs, displayed at the Banqueting House, Whitehall Palace in 2008.

"The Lovely People" at The Cube in Birmingham is a public art sculpture collection raised in 2010. The sculpture collection consists of "Urban", "Uplifted", "Working Man", "Survivor", "Mother and Child", and "Pursuit".
