= Hall of Memory =

Hall of Memory is a name used for some memorials, including:

- The Hall of Memory, Birmingham, a war memorial in Birmingham, United Kingdom, honoring residents killed in World War I.
- The octagonal chapel at the heart of the Australian War Memorial's commemorative area, honoring Australians killed in battle.
- The underground portion of the National Museum of the Holodomor-Genocide in Kyiv, Ukraine, honoring those killed in the Holodomor.
- The Goomeri Hall of Memory, a community center in Goomeri, Australia, honoring residents who have served in any war.

The name may also sometimes be used for something akin to a hall of fame.
