= Charles March Gere =

English painter

The Lady of Grey Days

Charles March Gere RA RWS (5 June 1869 – 3 August 1957) was an English painter, illustrator of books, and stained glass and embroidery designer associated with the Arts and Crafts movement.

A member of the Birmingham Group of Artist-Craftsmen that formed around Joseph Southall, Gere taught at the Birmingham School of Art under Edward R. Taylor and illustrated many books for William Morris's Kelmscott Press, including the frontispiece of Morris's own News from Nowhere. His sister, Margaret Gere, was also a painter and studied under him at the Birmingham School.

Gere painted a signal work in 1897 entitled The Lady of Grey Days. The painting was bought in 1912 and given to Aurora Howard by her mother. She was a descendant of the Earl of Carlisle, of Castle Howard. The painting was last seen in public in 1988, when it was included in an exhibition called The Last Romantics at the Barbican. It was used as a poster to advertise the exhibition on most London Underground stations. It is illustrated on the internet and is now in a private collection.
