= Charles Barber (artist) =

English painter

Charles Vincent Barber (c. 1784 – 1854) was an English landscape painter and art teacher.

He was born in Birmingham and baptised on 28 January 1784, the first son of Joseph Barber, the town's first drawing master. He studied at his father's art school where his fellow students included David Cox, who was to become a lifelong friend and with whom he was to regularly travel to North Wales to paint in later life.

In 1814 Barber was one of the artists who formed the academy of life drawing on Peck Lane in Birmingham that would eventually evolve into the Royal Birmingham Society of Artists and Birmingham School of Art.

By 1818 Barber had moved to Liverpool where he established himself as a drawing master. He exhibited at the Royal Academy, the Birmingham Society of Artists, and the Liverpool Academy of Arts, of which he was president from 1847 to 1853.
