= Samuel Lines =

English designer, painter and art teacher (1778–1863)

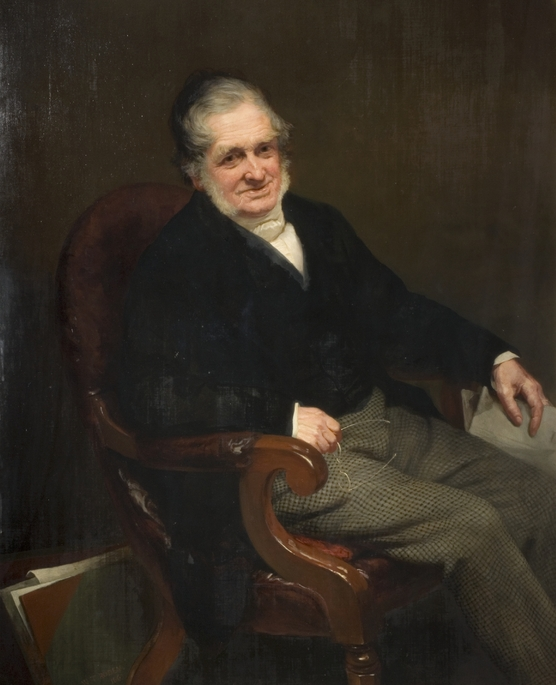
Samuel Lines (1863) by William Thomas Roden

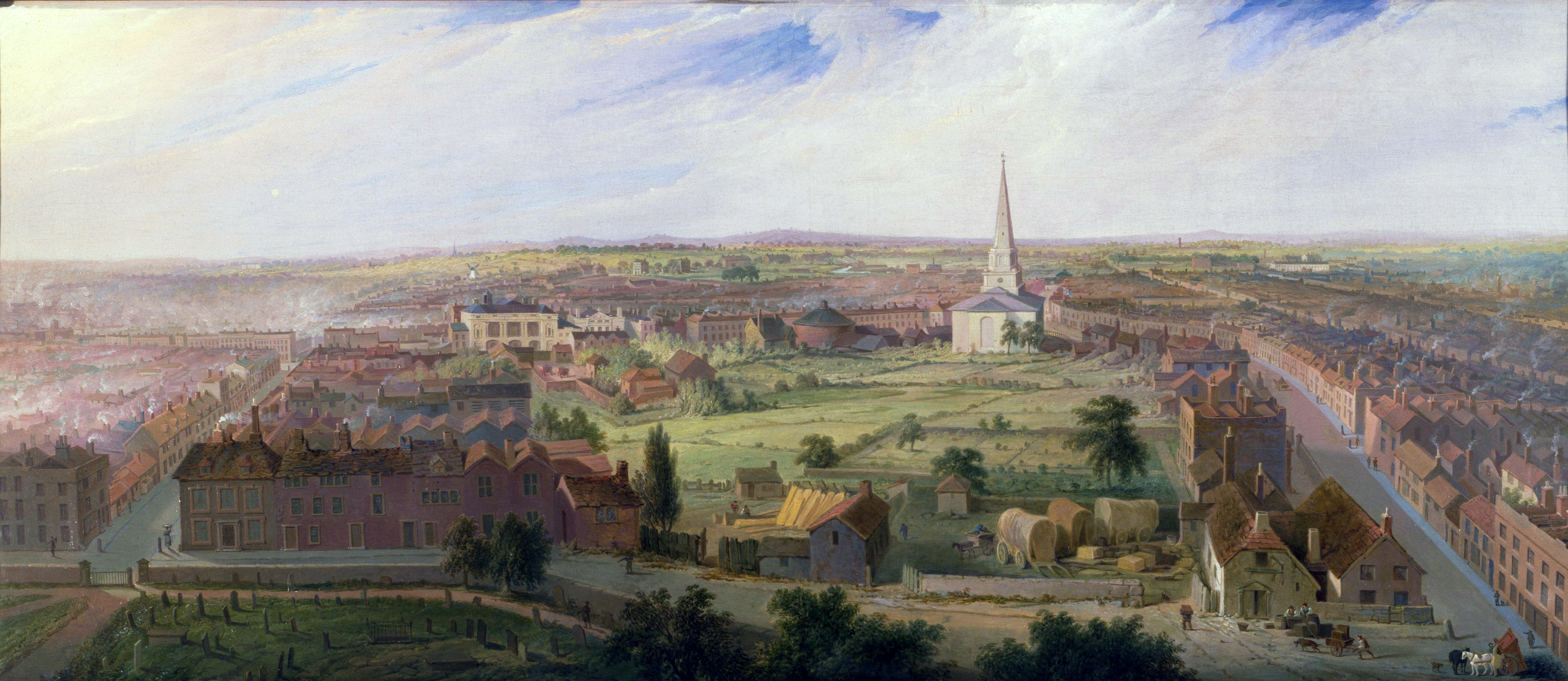
Samuel Lines, Birmingham from the Dome of St Philip's Church in 1821 (1821), Oil on canvas.

Samuel Lines (1778 – 22 November 1863) was an English designer, painter and art teacher, and an early member of the Birmingham School of landscape painters.

A significant figure in the development of art in Birmingham during its rapid growth in the early nineteenth century, Lines pioneered the teaching of drawing and painting in the town and was one of the founders of the life drawing academy that would eventually evolve into the Royal Birmingham Society of Artists and Birmingham School of Art.

== Life ==
Samuel Lines was born in the village of Allesley in Warwickshire, where his mother was a schoolmistress. After a period working in agriculture for his uncle he moved to Birmingham in 1794 and secured an apprenticeship as a designer to Thomas Keeling, a firm of clockmakers and enamellers. Lines was then employed by Messrs Osborn and Gunby of Bordesley as a sword blade decorator, designer and engraving to the highest standard. He also worked for Henry Clay, painting papier-mâché wares.

Lines studied drawing under Joseph Barber at the latter's academy on Great Charles Street, and in 1807 opened his own academy for training pupils in drawing and painting in Newhall Street. This was so successful that he was able to build his own house in Temple Row.

Lines' pupils included Thomas Creswick, Bernard Walter Evans, Andrew Hunt, Henry Martin Pope, William Wyon, and his own sons Samuel Rostill Lines, Frederick Thomas Lines and Henry Harris Lines. His art classes notoriously started at five o'clock in the morning, with Lines himself personally visiting latecomers to rouse them.

In addition to his influence on Birmingham's fine artists, Lines' tuition was to have a deep impact upon standards of design and craftsmanship across Birmingham's industries: at the time of the exhibition of works by his pupils in 1854 it was found that "by a reference to the Catalogue of the Great Exhibition of 1851, in London, it may be seen that upwards of forty-two of the most distinguished manufacturers of Birmingham received the rudiments of their artistic requirements at their Academy."

Lines' own academy held annual exhibitions of pupils' work, with prizes for "Best Perspective Drawing" and "Best Drawing in the Round", though Lines himself remarked that "No exhibition would satisfy me until we could have a public one, on similar lines to the Royal Academy". In 1809 he was one of a group of local artists who founded the Birmingham Academy of Arts – a school of life drawing that came closer to Lines' vision by holding its first public exhibition of its members' works after moving to Union Street in 1814. In 1821 this was refounded as the Birmingham Society of Arts with the help of wealthy local patrons, until the breakaway Birmingham Society of Artists formed in 1842 in protest at the society's decision to reform itself into a dedicated Government School of Design. Lines was the treasurer and curator of the society until he resigned at the age of eighty, when he was elected an honorary life member. He is buried in the graveyard of St Philip's Cathedral in Birmingham, where the monument to him is grade II listed.

Although he was most notable as a teacher, several of Lines' topographical landscapes are in the collection of the Birmingham Museum and Art Gallery.

== Plaque ==
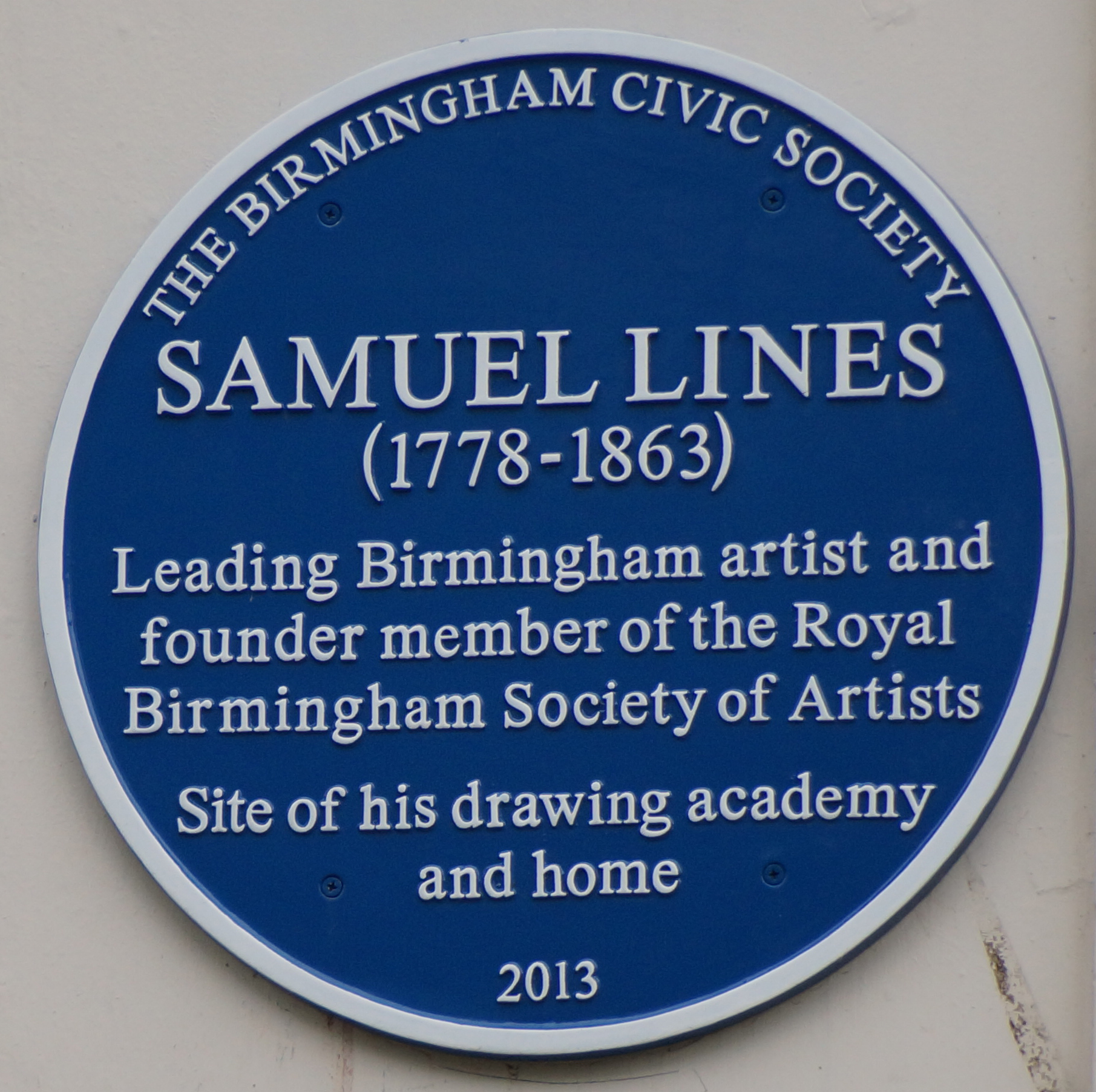
Blue plaque

In December 2013 a Birmingham Civic Society blue plaque was attached to the Old Joint Stock pub, (formerly a bank) on the site of his home and drawing academy.
