= Joseph Barber =

English painter

Joseph Barber (1757 – 16 July 1811) was an English landscape painter and art teacher, and an early member of the Birmingham School of landscape painters.

Born in Newcastle upon Tyne, Barber moved to Birmingham in the 1770s, where he worked painting papier-mâché and japanned goods. In 1798, Barber was appointed to teach drawing at the Free Grammar School on New Street holding classes in his studio on the corner of Edmund Street and Newhall Street. By the mid-1780s he was well established as the town's first drawing master, with an academy training artists on Great Charles Street. His pupils there included David Cox, William Radclyffe and Samuel Lines, who was to form his own academy in Newhall Street in 1807.

Barber had five children. His two sons Vincent Barber and Charles Barber both trained as painters in his academy, with Vincent taking over its running after his father's death in 1811. His daughters Maria, Eliza and Ann Matilda also exhibited paintings and taught private students. Ann Matilda was the mother of theologian and Bishop of Durham Joseph Barber Lightfoot.

Charles and Vincent Barber, with the elder Barber's former pupil Samuel Lines, set up a separate academy of life drawing in 1809, that would eventually evolve into the Royal Birmingham Society of Artists and Birmingham School of Art.

Joseph Barber's own work consists largely of drawings and watercolours of rustic landscape scenes - including pictures of North Wales, which he was the first of many Birmingham artists to paint. His works feature in the collections of the British Museum, the Victoria and Albert Museum and Birmingham Museum and Art Gallery. Samuel Lines wrote of him, 'He was a very talented artist of the old school. He drew the figure and painted landscape well. Most of his time was employed in teaching drawing, chiefly in Indian ink and tinted with colours - such was at that time the manner of making watercolour drawings'.
