= Edward R. Taylor =

English painter (1838–1912)

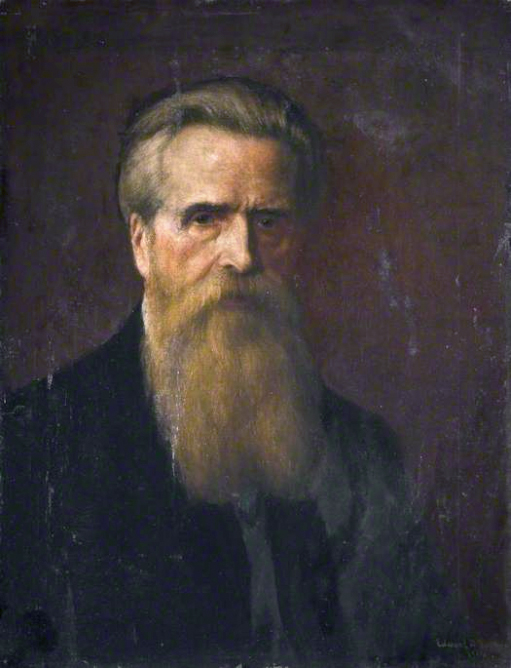
Self-portrait (1906)

Edward Richard Taylor RBSA (14 June 1838 – 14 January 1912) was an English artist and educator. He painted in both oils and watercolours. He became a member of the Royal Birmingham Society of Artists in 1879.

== Biography ==
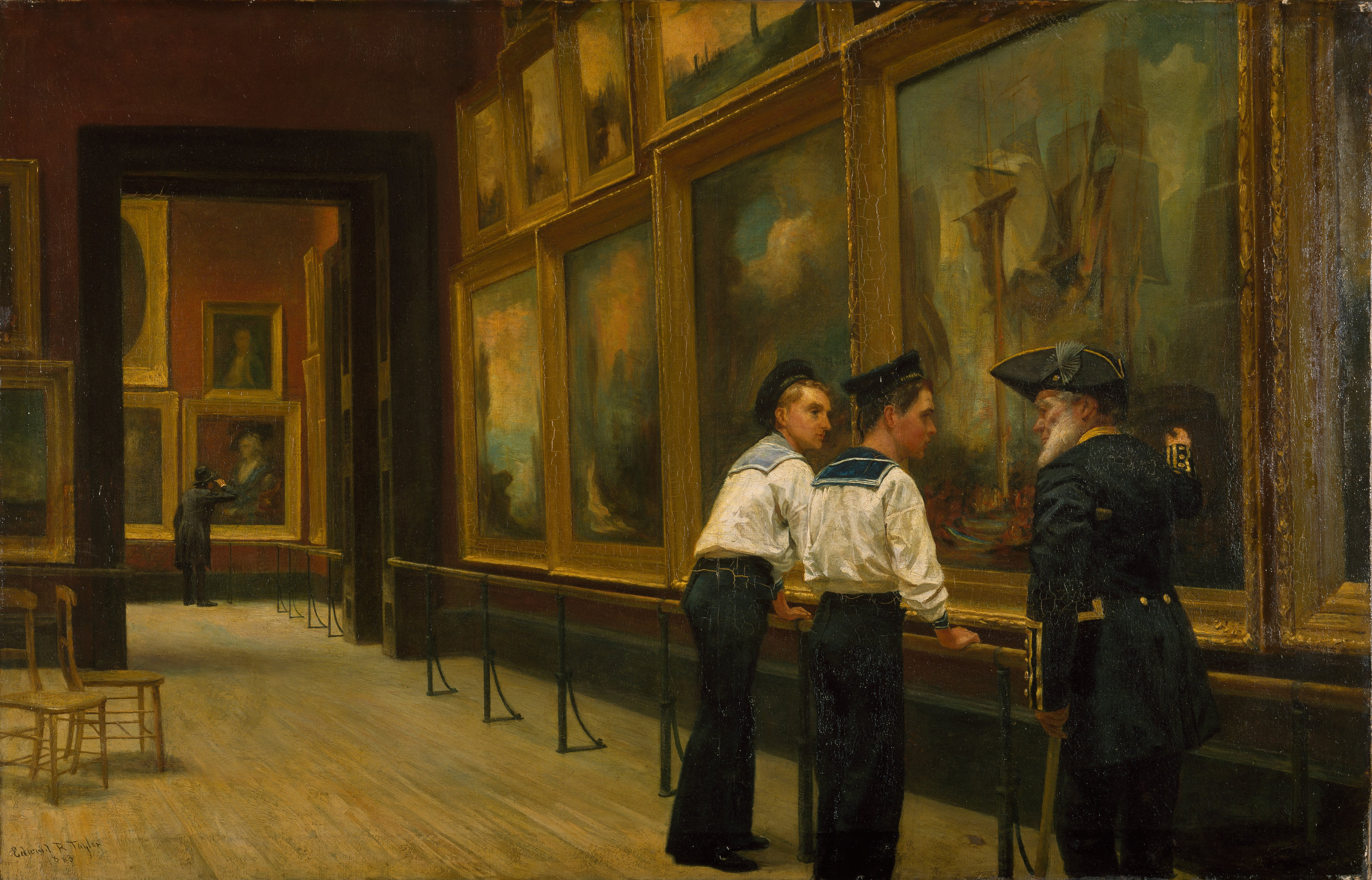
Twas a Famous Victory by Edward Richard Taylor (1883; Birmingham Museum and Art Gallery)

Taylor taught at the Lincoln School of Art, where amongst his pupils were William Logsdail and Frank Bramley, and became influential in the Arts and Crafts movement as the first headmaster at the Birmingham Municipal School of Arts and Crafts from 1877–1903. In December 1898, he founded Ruskin Pottery at Smethwick, Staffordshire. Since 2003, the work of this artist has been auctioned with one painting, The Avon from Bideford, sold at Andrew Hartley Fine Arts in 2012 for a record price.

== Personal life ==
Taylor married Mary Parr on 1 May 1858 at St. John, Burslem. They had five daughters and two sons. His youngest son, William Howson Taylor (1876–1935), took over Ruskin Pottery after the death of his father on 14 January 1912.

== See also ==
- Birmingham Group
