= Women's Guild of Arts =

Professional body for women-identified artists

The Women's Guild of Arts was founded in 1907 by Arts and Crafts artists May Morris and Mary Elizabeth Turner. The organisation offered female artists an alternative professional body to the Art Workers Guild, an artists' association founded in 1884 that excluded women and was based on the ideas of William Morris and the Arts and Crafts Movement.

The Women's Guild was established with May Morris as its First President and watercolourist and etcher Mary Annie Sloane as its Honorary Secretary. Other key initiators included Mabel Esplin, Agnes Garrett, Mary Lowndes, Marianne Stokes, Evelyn De Morgan, Georgie Gaskin, Mary J. Newill, Ethel Fanny Everett, and Letty Graham. The Guild grew to include about 60 artists.

== History ==
The first gathering of the guild was held in the Chelsea studio of muralist painter Mary Sargant Florence on 18 January 1907. Those present were some of the leading women artists, designers and craftworkers of the time: tempera painter and art patron Christiana Herringham; gilder Mary Batten; embroiderer, teacher, and writer Grace Christie; muralist Mary Sargant Florence; sculptor Feodora Gleichen; calligrapher Florence Kate Kingsford; and stained-glass artist Mary Lowndes. The group compiled a list of women art workers in Britain and invited them each by letter to join the guild.

The founding members of the guild were predominantly around middle-age and had already established an informal professional network through friendships and studying alongside one another. Among the group, May Morris was the driving force of the Women's Guild of Arts in its early years. Thirty-six women joined the guild in its first year, including bookbinders Katherine Adams and Sarah Prideaux; interior designer Agnes Garrett; painters Marianne Stokes, Annie Swynnerton, and Evelyn de Morgan; and muralist Mary Seton Watts.

The Women's Guild of Arts closely replicated the role and activities of the Art Workers' Guild. It held meetings at the same venues and cultivated a close professional network among its members. There were also occasionally joint events held in collaboration by the two groups.

There were significant crossovers with the first-wave feminist movement, with many members active in the suffrage campaign. Mary Lowndes established the Artists' Suffrage League in the same year that the guild was formed and many members joined both groups. Most of the founding members of the Women's Guild of Arts had begun their careers against the backdrop of debates around the 'New Woman' in the late-1800s.

During World War One the Guild's general meetings continued, but the group shifted towards more public and philanthropic events and activities. The Guild furnished a Lady's bedroom for the Arts and Crafts Exhibition Society's 11th exhibition at the Royal Academy in 1916 in London.

The WGA continued until at least 1961, when Mary Annie Sloane died.

== Activities ==
The application process to join the guild was rigorous. Applicants had to identify a proposer and seconder within the guild's existing membership and present a portfolio of their work. Members paid an annual subscription fee, which was reduced for members based outside of London who were unable to attend regular meetings.

There were six or seven formal meetings of the guild per year. These took place at Clifford's Inn Hall on Fleet Street and later at 6 Queen Square in Bloomsbury after 1914. These meetings generally included lectures by members or visiting speakers, providing a rare opportunity for women art workers to showcase and debate their work. Members additionally held regular social gatherings, exhibitions, visits to museums and houses, and 'at-homes' in their studios.

== Membership ==
- Mabel Esplin
- Ethel Everett
- Agnes Garrett
- Georgie Gaskin
- Letty Graham
- Mary Lowndes
- Evelyn De Morgan
- May Morris
- Mary J. Newill
- Mary Annie Sloane
- Marianne Stokes
- Mary Elizabeth Turner
