= Women's Printing Society =

British publishing house

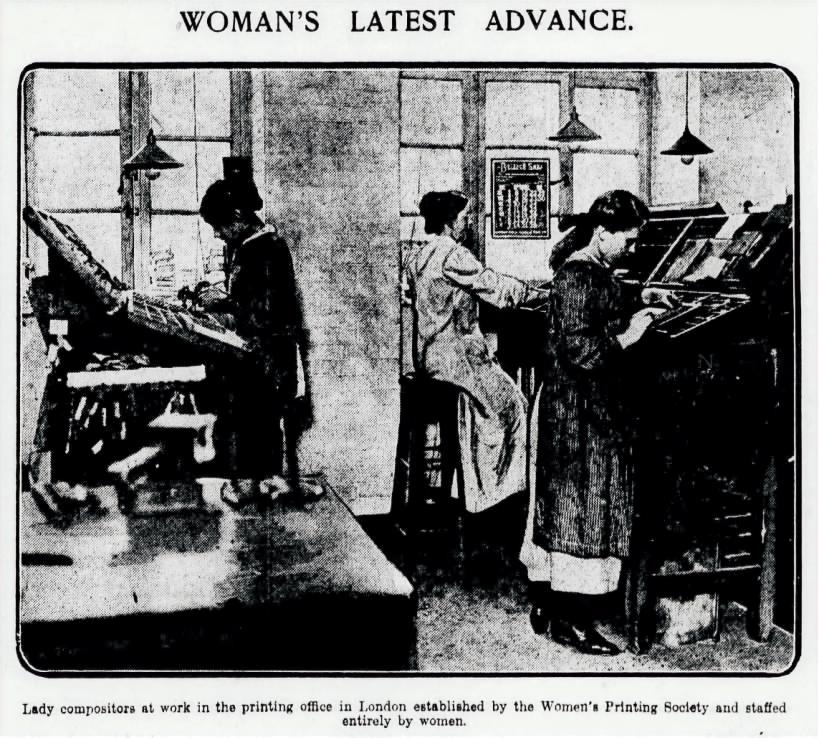
A group of women compositors at work in the Women's Printing Society c.1912

The Women's Printing Society was a British publishing house founded in either 1874 or 1876 by Emma Paterson and Emily Faithfull with the company being officially incorporated as a cooperative in 1878.

== Involvement in the suffragist movement ==
The company played an important role in British suffrage movement, both through its publication of feminist tracts and in providing employment opportunities for women in a field that had previously been restricted to men. The house was set up to allow women to learn the trade of printing, and provided an apprenticeship program. Women worked as compositors, and as of 1904, it was one of the few houses where they also did the imposing: ordering the galley proofs so that when folded, the front and back pages aligned properly. As of 1899, the company employed 22 women as compositors. The manager, proof-reader and bookkeeper were also women. Men held the tasks of "pressmen and feeders". The women apprentices earned a wage "considering the hours (9 to 6.30), etc., this is better pay than even highly-educated women can sometimes secure". Some of the initial employees came from Faithfull's Victoria Press.

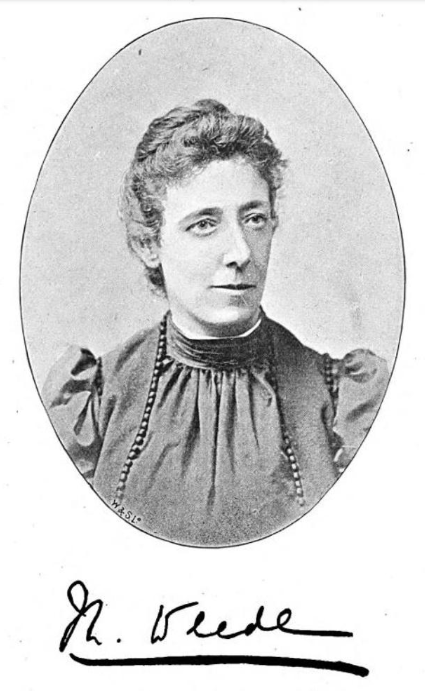
Margaret Weede, manager of the Women's Printing Society in London from 1886.

== Notable employees ==
The Board of Directors included Sarah Prideaux, Mabel Winkworth and Stewart Duckworth Headlam. Elizabeth Yeats studied for a brief time at the Women's Printing Society, before returning to Ireland and starting the Dun Emer Press.

Up to 1893 and between 1889 and 1900, the company published the reports of the Central Committee for the National Society for Women's Suffrage. It published the Women's Penny Paper through 1890, but it is not recorded why the relationship ended.

== Selected works ==
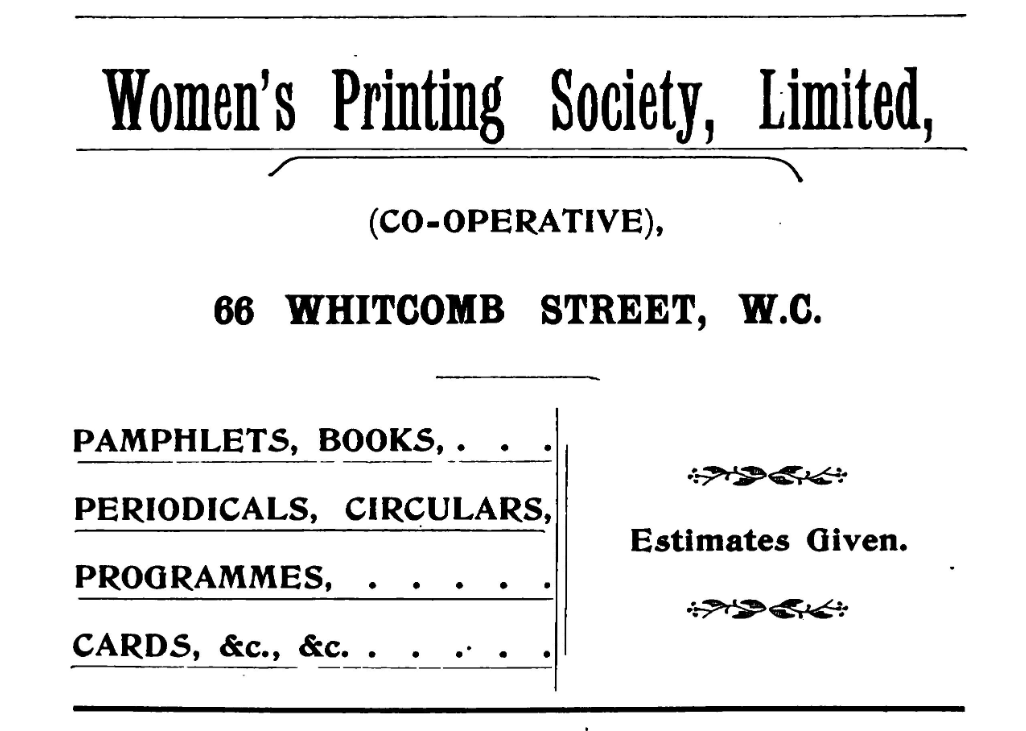
Women's Printing Society advertisement from 1895

Works published by the Women's Printing Society include:

- What is women's suffrage and why do women want it by Veritas (1883)
- A Woman's Plea to Women by Elizabeth Clarke Wolstenholme Elmy (reprint from Macclesfield Courier) (1886)
- Home Politics: An Address by Millicent Garrett Fawcett (1894)
- Swimming and its relation to the Health of Women by Frances Hoggan (1879)
- Education of Girls in Wales by Frances Hoggan (1879)
- Women in India and the Duty of their English Sisters y bMrs. Martindale (1896)
- Thomas Wilde Powell by Christiana Herringham (1903)
- Papers of the Society of Painters in Tempera by Christina Herringham.
- Woman Suffrage and the Anti-militants by Ennis Richmond
- Choose, Ye: Darkness or Light! by Lady Melville (1922)
- the exhibition catalogue of the London International Surrealist Exhibition (1936)
