= Ethel Fanny Everett =

British painter and illustrator

Ethel Fanny Everett (24 September 1877 – 30 August 1951) was an English painter and illustrator, specialising in children's book illustration. She was born in London and studied at the Royal Academy Schools from 1899 to 1904. Alongside May Morris and Mary Elizabeth Turner, Everett was one of the founding members of the Women's Guild of Arts.

== Life ==
Everett was born in Southwark, London and in 1911 is recorded as living at 170 Kennington Park Road. She attended Mary Datchelor School, a girls' grammar school in Camberwell, before studying at the Royal Academy Schools.

Working as a children's book illustrator and portrait painter, with a career spanning roughly 1900-1939, Everett was one of the most prolific women artists working in Britain at the time. Some of her most notable work is the illustration for Charles Kingsley's Water Babies and Enid Blyton's Silver and Gold. She designed a number of travel posters for the London Underground Group in 1914. During her career, Everett exhibited eight works at the Royal Academy. She also staged her own exhibitions, in July 1935 installing a "delightful picture gallery with grouped plants and palms at the centre" at the Saffron Rooms, Eastbourne.

Everett was one of the founding members of the Women's Guild of Arts and in 1916 was listed as a committee member. In 1915 she contributed to the creation of a frieze in the Women's Recreation Room at the Belgian Refugee Camp for World War One refugees based in Earl's Court. She worked on this alongside fellow Women's Guild of Arts members May Morris, Pamela Colman Smith, Lola Frampton, and Eleanor Rowe. The frieze has not survived and it is not known what it depicted, but it is known to have been an 83 by 5 foot work, featuring painted contributions by each of the women.

Retiring around the time of the onset of the Second World War, Everett moved to Mullion Cottage, in the Essex village of Chrishall. Everett never married and lived with her brother at Mullion Cottage.

Everett died on 30 August 1951 at St James' Hospital in Saffron Walden.
