= Katharine Adams =

British bookbinder (1862–1952)

- Born: 25 November 1862; Berkshire, England
- Died: 15 October 1952 (aged 89); Gloucestershire, England
- Known for: Bookbinding
- Spouse: Edmund James Webb (m. 1913)

Katharine Adams (25 November 1862 – 15 October 1952) was a British bookbinder famous for her detailed leather bindings.

== Biography ==
Adams was born in Bracknell, a town in Berkshire, England, to Catherine Mary Horton (d. 1912) and Reverend William Fulford Adams (d. 1912). Her childhood friends included Jane Alice Morris and May Morris, daughters of the artist William Morris. Adams trained briefly as a bookbinder with Sarah Prideaux and T. J. Cobden-Sanderson in London in 1897, then set up her own workshop in Lechlade. In May 1898, she won first prize in amateur bookbinding at the Oxford arts and crafts exhibition.

In 1901, Adams established the Eadburgha Bindery in Gloucestershire, where she employed and trained two assistants, both women. She soon received frequent commissions from the likes of Emery Walker and Sydney Cockerell. Two of her most important commissions were The Buildings of the British Museum presented to George V and a psalter presented to Queen Mary. Her patrons also included the Doves Press, the Ashendene Press, and the Kelmscott Press. In 1913, she married Edmund James Webb, and they moved to Otmoor near Islip in Oxfordshire before returning to Gloucestershire in the 1930s.

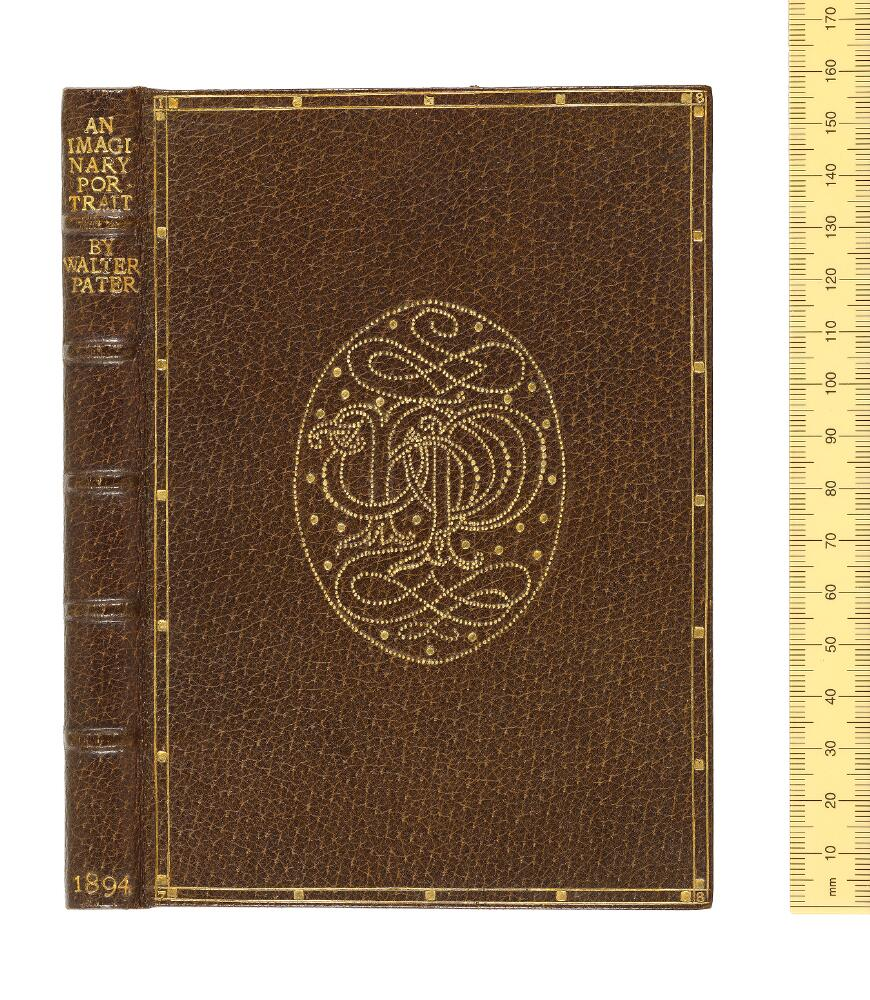
The Bodleian copy of Walter Pater's An Imaginary Portrait (1894), re-bound for the Library in 1916 by Katharine Adams, with her cover-design

Adams' bindings were intricate and usually featured fine, pictorial gold details on leather, made using tools she made herself (now held by the British Library). She was largely self-taught. She exhibited frequently throughout Europe as well as North America and South Africa. She became the president of the Women's Guild of Arts and, in 1938, a fellow of the Royal Society of Arts.

Adams continued to bind until her death at her home, The Cherries, in Gloucestershire, on 15 October 1952. In her lifetime, she completed an estimated 300 bindings.

== Legacy ==
Adams' bindings are held by private collectors and collecting institutions alike. Her papers are held at:

- Bodleian Library (Add. MSS 45300–45304, 45307, 45330, 43694, 50002, 50004, 54231)
- J.P. Getty Library at Wormsley
- Southern Methodist University, Dallas, Bridwell Library
- University of California, Berkeley, Bancroft Library
