= Mary Lobb =

Companion of English designer May Morris (1878–1939)

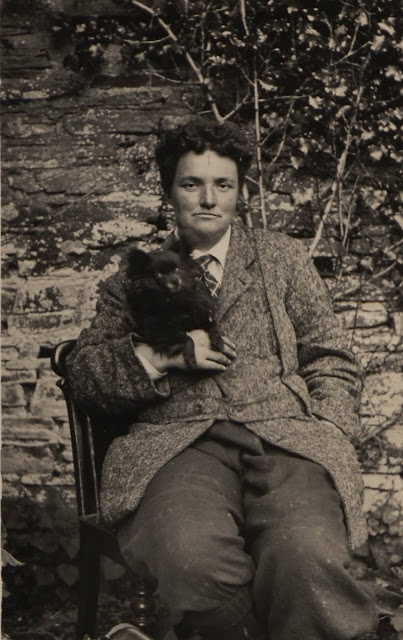
- Lobb, circa 1910s
- Born: 1 October 1878; Cornwall
- Died: 27 March 1939 (aged 60); Kelmscott
- Other name: Miss Vivian Lobb
- Partner: May Morris

Mary Frances Vivian Lobb (1 October 1878–27 March 1939) was an English Land Army volunteer and life companion to the English designer May Morris for 22 years.

== Early life ==
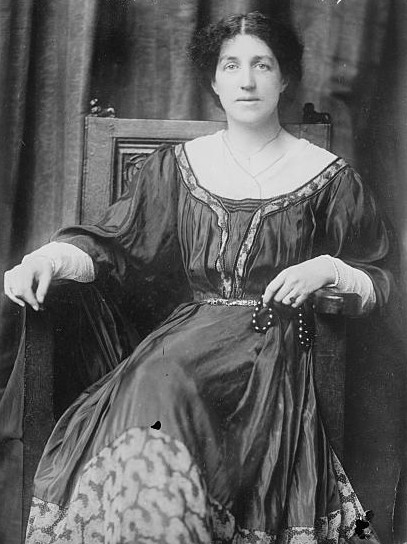
Mary Lobb was companion to May Morris who is shown in this photograph taken in 1909.

Mary Francis Vivian Lobb was born in New Malden, Surrey on 1 October 1878. Her parents were Nicholas William Lobb and Emma Vivian Lobb, and she was the second of their five children. Lobb grew up in South Petherwin and Trenault, Cornwall, and was educated at St. Thomas College in Launceston.

== Personal life ==
Lobb was a Land Girl, or Land Army volunteer, in World War I. In 1917 Lobb met May Morris, who was living at Kelmscott Manor, which had been her father William Morris' country retreat. Morris had had two relationships with men that had failed before meeting Lobb. Lobb moved in, initially serving as a gardener. Lobb and Morris would spend the rest of their lives together. Lobb was known for wearing sturdy clothes, with a Norfolk jacket and knickerbockers. Evelyn Waugh described Lobb as a 'hermaphrodite' and George Bernard Shaw also described Lobb in negative terms. As time passed, Lobb and Morris travelled through Europe, including visits to Iceland and Gwbert in Wales.

May Morris died in 1938, leaving £12,000 to Mary Lobb and tenure of Kelmscott Manor, where Lobb remained until her death the following year.Following Morris' death some of the objects in Kelmscott Manor were auctioned off. Lobb donated the jewellery that Morris had left to her to Victoria and Albert Museum in London, and gave the city of Exeter her Icelandic artefacts which included a drinking horn.

== Death ==
Lobb died of heart disease on 27 March 1939. Her will stipulated she was to have no coffin, only a plain oblong box. She was cremated; her wish was for her ashes to be "scattered on a Cornish Moor preferably Bosporthennis Manor". She left her notebooks to the National Library of Wales in Aberystwyth.

In 2017, the Kelmscott Manor Museum held an exhibition centred on Lobb.
