= Thomas Wilde Powell =

English solicitor and stockbroker

Thomas Wilde Powell (1818–1897) was an English solicitor and stockbroker, now remembered as a patron of architects and artists.

== Early life ==
He was the son of James Powell, a bank clerk living in 1830 in Briggate, Leeds in Yorkshire, and his wife Christiana Wilde, daughter of Theophilus Wilde, He entered Leeds Grammar School in early 1833, where the headmaster was Joseph Holmes, and his rival Edwin Gilpin, who became Archdeacon of Nova Scotia. He left in autumn 1833, and was articled to the Leeds solicitors Atkinson, Dibb, and Bolland, working for five years under Thomas Townend Dibb. At this period he became a Sunday school teacher for William Sinclair at St George's Church, Leeds.

After his five years working for his articles were up, Powell stayed at Atkinson, Dibb, and Bolland for two further years, on a salary. In early 1842 he passed his qualification examination, and set up on his own in Albion Street, Leeds, as a solicitor. Shortly, in partnership with Frederick Heycock, he used a back room there to deal in railway shares. At the height of the Railway Mania, in 1845, on Powell's own account, Heycock found the stress too much. Powell successfully saw through the dealings on his own, and bought Heycock out. He is recorded in 1846 as a solicitor living in Headingley Terrace, Leeds. In 1847 he was still in practice at Albion Court.

Closing down his stockbroking business, Powell spent some time in 1849 with family at Holme Lodge in Swaledale, a few miles from Thirsk. He started to be approached by activist investors. A group from Leeds asked him to implement change in a London gas company. Charles Swainson wanted him to restrain his son-in-law Ralph Ward Jackson in the development of West Hartlepool: but from a base at Seaton Carew he concluded that Jackson was "beyond my control (or anyone else's)."

== London stockbroker ==
Marriage in 1852 brought Powell into the London stockbrokers Marten & Heseltine. He became senior partner there in 1872, when they traded as Heseltine, Powell & Co.

Powell and Edward Heseltine, a founding partner, dealt particularly in American railroad bonds and shares. John Postle Heseltine, son of Edward, was a junior partner. They supported bond issues for the New York and Erie Rail Road, Baltimore and Ohio Railroad (1873) and Pennsylvania Railroad (1876). In relation to the Marietta and Cincinnati Railroad, they put British representatives on the board.

When the Reading Railroad's financial troubles came to a head in 1880, Powell corresponded with Franklin B. Gowen, on behalf of the committee of London bondholders chaired by Lord Cairns. The series of letters with Powell in Philadelphia was published shortly. Powell was acting largely for McCalmont Brothers & Co. of London, who had acquired a controlling interest the Railroad, and had fallen out with Gowen in mid-1880, leading to his temporary departure. Discussions between Gowen and Powell foundered on the composition of an American committee, on which Gowen wished to have a number of the Railroad's current board. Powell brought up matters of outside dealings of Adolph E. Borie, and his brother-in-law H. Pratt McKean, and Gowen was unable to accept the imputations of dishonesty in these supporters.

With other bankers and financiers, Heseltine, Powell & Co. acquired natural resources in the industrialising West Virginia. It has been commented that its activities came close in some cases to that of merchant banker.

== Later life ==
Powell was a major shareholder in the Western Australian Land Company. He travelled to Western Australia in 1889. He had bought there the Eastwood Estate, of 5,000 acres (2,000 ha) near Lakeside (now Ellerker), west of Albany. He also acquired another large tract of land. Powell had imported two steam ploughs on SS Nairnshire, and set them to work on his estate in November 1889. They were manufactured by John Fowler & Co. of Leeds. They were unskillfully employed, however, and the crops failed to yield.

At his death, the estate of Thomas Wilde Powell was valued at £195,508.

== Art and architecture ==
Influenced by John Postle Heseltine, Powell began to collect fine art. He also commissioned a number of buildings:

- "Piccard's Rough" in Guildford, from Richard Norman Shaw: it became his home. Rowe also designed for Powell Hitherbury House and other houses nearby.
- Wycliffe Buildings, Guildford (1894), from Hugh Thackeray Turner, his son-in-law.

== Family ==
Powell married in 1852 Mary Elizabeth Marten (1826–1871), daughter of Charles Marten (1797–1851) and his wife Hannah Watson (1798–1881), daughter of Joseph Watson of Highbury. Charles W. Marten was a founder of Marten & Heseltine in 1848, with Edward Heseltine, and Powell had used the company as London agents from his days in Leeds.

Their children were:

- Christiana Herringham (1852–1929), artist and patron.
- Mary Elizabeth Powell (1854–1907), embroiderer, who married Hugh Thackeray Turner. Their daughter Ruth married George Mallory.
- Charles Marten Powell (born 1855), surgeon. He graduated B.A. at Corpus Christi College, Oxford in 1879.
- Thomas Edmund Powell (born 1857), solicitor. He graduated B.A. at Oriel College, Oxford in 1880.
- Eleanor Grace Powell (1859–1945). At the time of the 1881 census she was a school teacher in Lewisham. She took a Class 1 in history in the Oxford University Women's Examination of 1886, from Somerville Hall. She was then a tutor there, from 1886 to 1892. In the 1890s she contributed to the Dictionary of Political Economy (85 articles) and Dictionary of National Biography. She was active in the settlement movement with Margaret Sewell.
- Rosamond Emma Powell, married 1894 William Alfred Wills, M.D.
- Herbert Andrews Powell (born 1863), physician. He graduated B.A. at Corpus Christi College, Oxford in 1885. At Oxford he knew Henry Newbolt, who visited the Powell family around 1882, finding them "a special kind of civilisation", and the father "Olympian", terminating a dance at 1 a.m. and switching off the lights.
- Agnes Margaret Powell (1866–1918), married 1889 Charles Wolryche Dixon: he was the second son of George Dixon. She wrote The Canteeners (1917), a memoir of her Red Cross experiences in World War I.
- Theodora Powell (1871–1920), studied at Somerville Hall.
