= Hugh Thackeray Turner =

English architect (1853–1937)

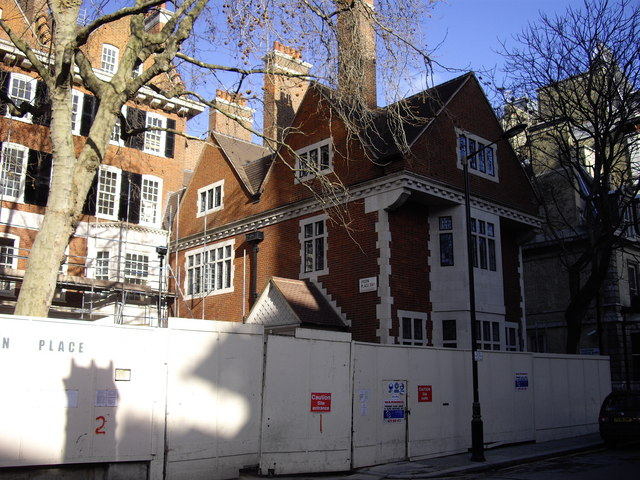
Grade II listed buildings in Lygon Place off Ebury Street in central London, designed by Eustace Balfour and Hugh Thackeray Turner in the Arts and Crafts style.

Hugh Thackeray Turner (8 March 1853 – 11 December 1937) was an English Arts and Crafts architect and also an amateur china painter.

Hugh Turner was born at Foxearth, Essex, England. His father, Rev. John Richard Turner, was a Church of England vicar from Wiltshire.

Turner was apprenticed to the architect Sir George Gilbert Scott and worked under his son too.

Turner's buildings included Wycliffe Buildings (1894), The Court (1902), and Mead Cottage in Guildford, Surrey. In 1899, Turner bought some land in Godalming, Surrey, with the aim of building a house. He designed "Westbrook", which became his residence. He also designed the garden there. With the Arts and Crafts garden designer Gertrude Jekyll, he designed the Philips Memorial Cloister on the riverside in Godalming, commemorating the bravery of Jack Philips, a hero on board the Titanic in 1912.

In 1888, Turner married the embroiderer Mary Elizabeth Powell (1854–1907), the daughter of Thomas Wilde Powell from Guildford. Their daughter, Ruth, married George Mallory, the climber of Mount Everest who also taught at Charterhouse School.
