= Mary Annie Sloane =

English painter

- Born: 10 December 1867; Leicester
- Died: 30 November 1961 (aged 93)
- Education: Leicester School of Art; National Art Training School
- Known for: etching

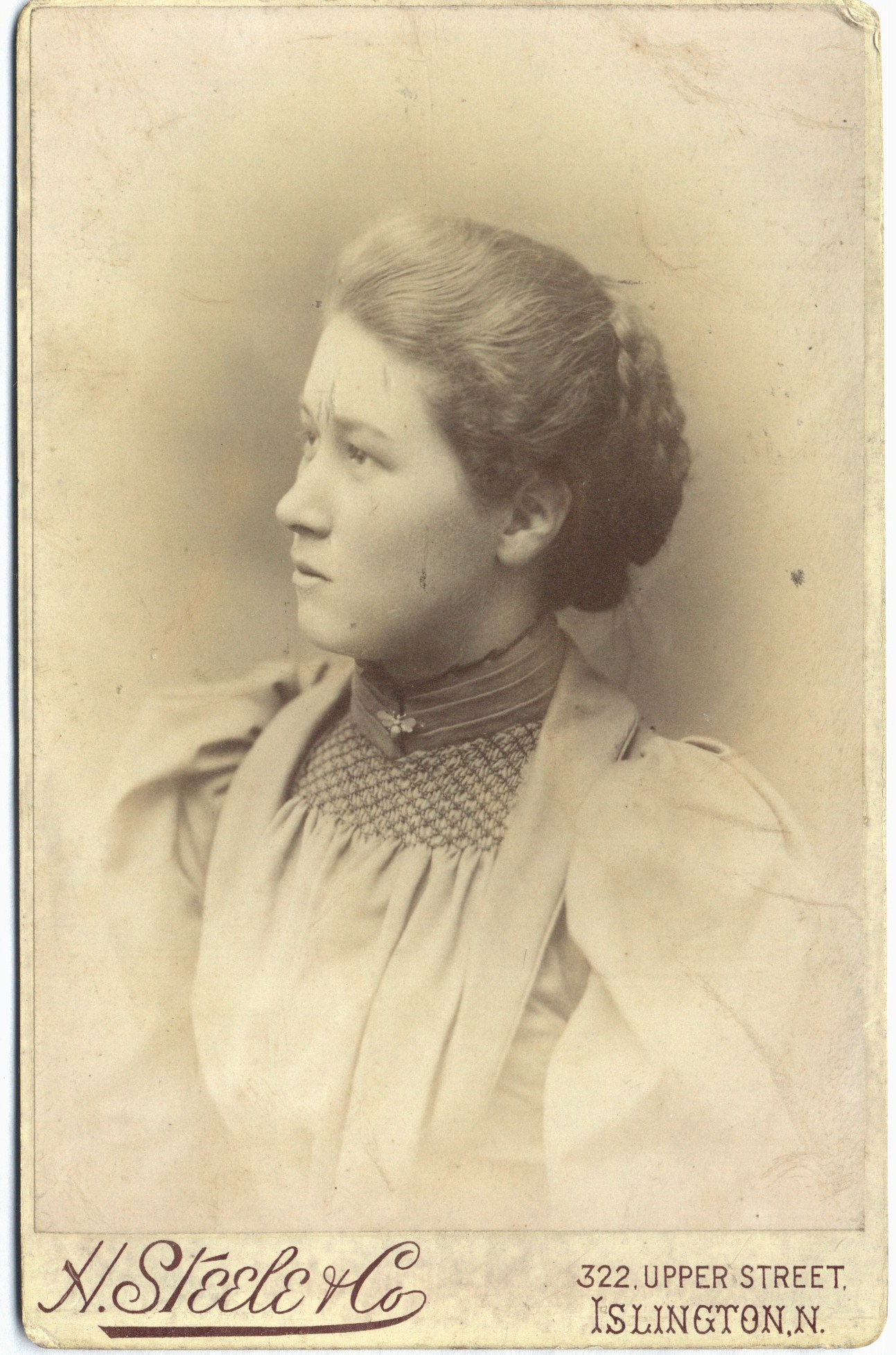
Mary A Sloane, taken in 1891 or 1892. By H. Steele and Co. 322 Upper Street, Islington, London.

Mary Annie Sloane (10 December 1867 – 30 November 1961) was a British artist associated with the Arts and Crafts movement.

== Life ==
She was born in Leicester, an area which was the subject of many of her prints. She first studied at Leicester School of Art and was taught etching and engraving by Hubert von Herkomer in his school at Bushey, and later studied under Francis Job Short at the Royal College of Art. She lived for many years in the village of Enderby, Leicestershire, where she made a number of etchings of weavers, a traditional craft practised there as well as other subjects.

She became a close friend of May Morris, William Morris's daughter, and lived with her for a while in Majorca. She later took over the lease of May’s house at 8 Hammersmith Terrace in London, near Kelmscott House. She was a member and Honorary Secretary of the Women’s Guild of Arts that May Morris founded in 1907. She was a frequent visitor to William Morris's houses, where she met other members of the Arts and Crafts movement.

She exhibited at the Royal Academy and the Paris Salon, but few of her works were published. In 2012-3 there was an exhibition of her watercolours and engravings at the William Morris Society in Hammersmith. In 2016 she was the subject of an exhibition at Leicester's New Walk Museum.
