= Adrian Scott Stokes =

English painter (1854–1935)

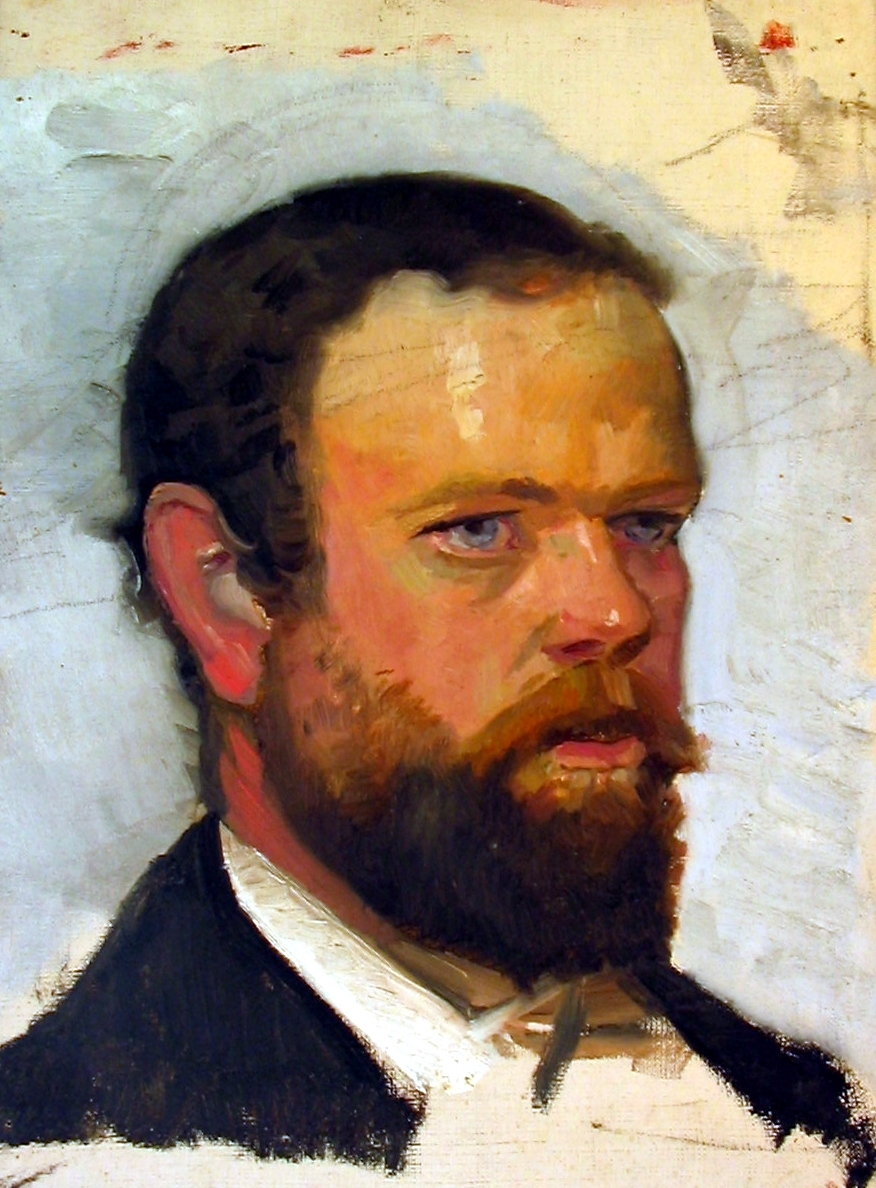
Adrian Stokes; portrait by Michael Ancher

Charles Adrian Scott Stokes (23 December 1854 – 30 November 1935) was an English landscape painter. Born in Southport, Lancashire, he became a cotton broker in Liverpool, where his artistic talent was noticed by John Herbert RA, who advised him to submit his drawings to the Royal Academy. He entered the Royal Academy Schools in 1872 and exhibited at the academy from 1876.

== Biography ==
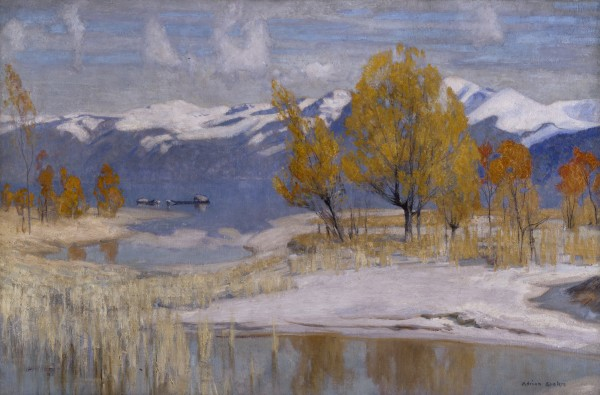
Adrian Scott Stokes: Lago Maggiore

From 1876, travelling to Fontainebleau and Barbizon, he came under the influence of French plein air landscape painters including Jules Bastien-Lepage. He also painted genre works and portraits influenced by Frederic Leighton, John Everett Millais and Parisians such as Pascal Dagnan-Bouveret.

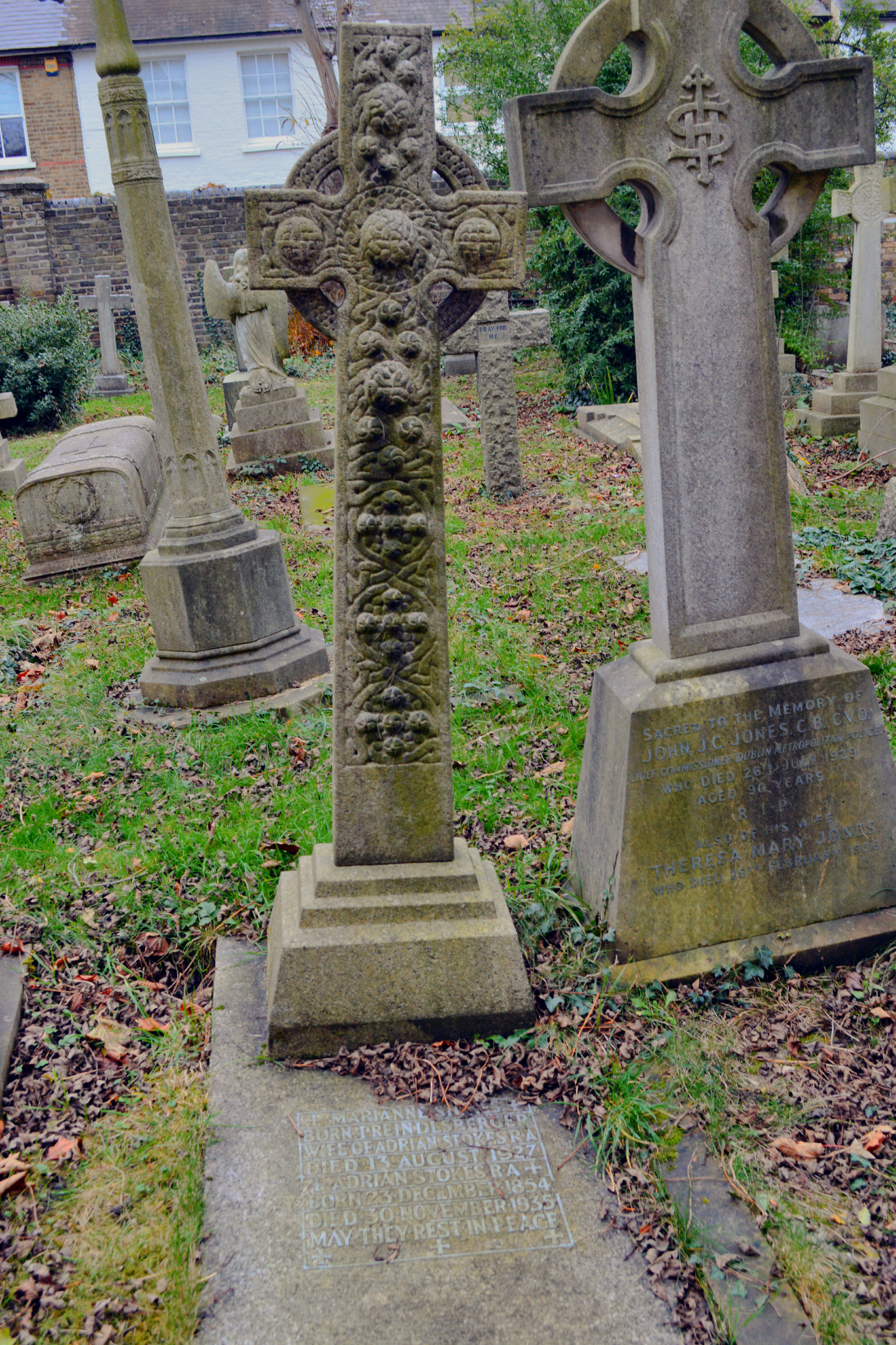
St Mary Magdalen, Mortlake

In 1884, he married Austrian artist Marianne Preindlesberger (1855–1927). She became a well-known artist under her married name of Marianne Stokes. The couple spent the summers of 1885 and 1886 at Skagen in the far north of Denmark where there was an artists' colony which became known as the Skagen Painters. There they struck up a close friendship with Michael and Anna Ancher. After an extended stay in France, the couple returned to Britain where they settled in Cornwall at Carbis Bay and joining the artists' colony at St Ives in 1886. The couple travelled frequently to Tyrol and in 1905 to Slovakia. In 1905, the couple made their first visit to Hungary, returning in 1907 and 1908.

Adrian Stokes was a landscape painter, concerned most with atmospheric effects, and later with decorative landscapes. He was the author of Landscape Painting (1925). He became ARA in 1909 and RA in 1919, won medals at the Paris Exhibition and Chicago World Fair (1889), became first President of the St Ives Arts Club (1890) and became Vice President of the Royal Watercolour Society (1932).

Marianne Stokes died during 1927. Adrian Stokes died during 1935. Both were buried at Mortlake Roman Catholic Cemetery, London. An obituary of Adrian Stokes was published in The Times on 2 December 1935.

== Paintings ==
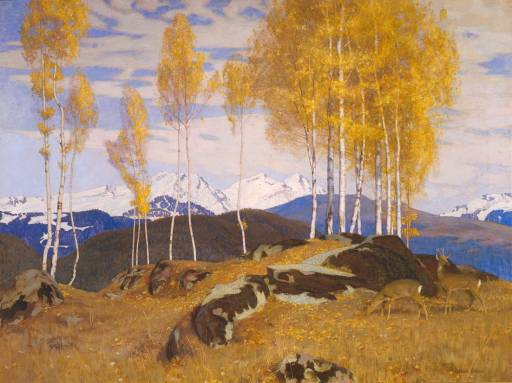
Autumn in the Mountains

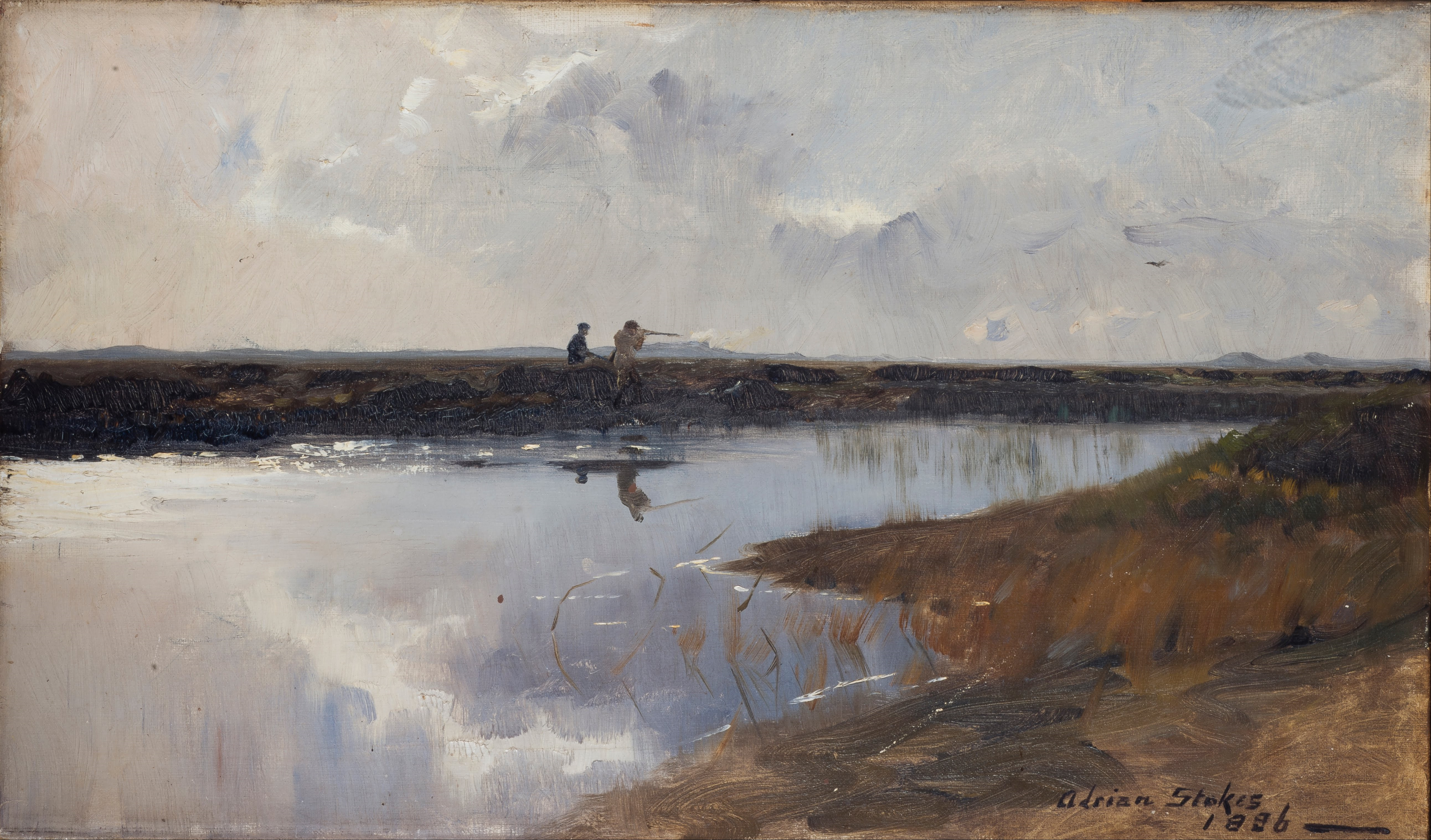
Hunters on the moor north of Skagen

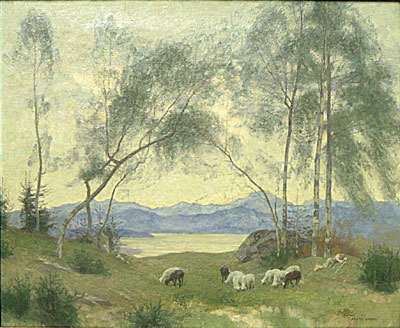
Dawn

== Literature ==
- Evans, Magdalen (2009). Utmost fidelity: the painting lives of Marianne and Adrian Stokes. Sansom & Company. ISBN 978-1-906593-01-8.
