= Mary Elizabeth Turner =

English embroiderer

Mary Elizabeth Turner (née Powell; 1854–1907) was an English embroiderer who exhibited her work at the 1890 exposition of the Arts and Crafts Exhibition Society, for which she wrote an essay on modern embroidery. She was also the co-founder of the Women’s Guild of Arts with May Morris.

== Personal life ==
Turner's father was Thomas Wilde Powell, a solicitor and stockbroker who was also a patron of architects and artists. One of her siblings was the artist, copyist and art patron Christiana Herringham. Her husband was the architect Hugh Thackeray Turner. One of her children, her daughter Christiana Ruth Turner, was the wife of climber George Mallory.
