= Marianne Stokes =

Austrian painter (1855–1927)

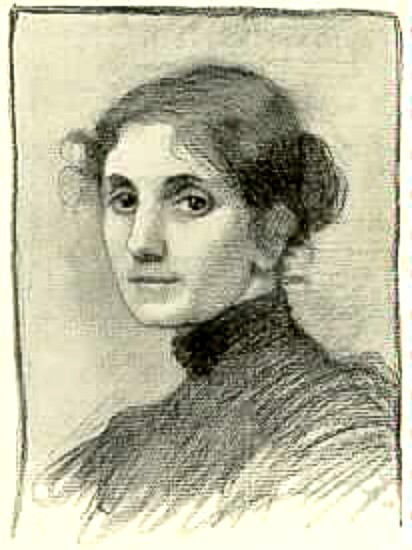
- Born: Marianne Preindlsberger; 1855; Graz, Styria, Austrian Empire
- Died: August 1927 (aged 71–72); London, England
- Known for: Painting
- Spouse: Adrian Scott Stokes (m. 1884)

Marianne Stokes (née Preindlsberger; 1855–1927) was an Austrian painter. She settled in England after her marriage to Adrian Scott Stokes (1854–1935), the landscape painter, whom she had met in Pont-Aven. Stokes was considered one of the leading women artists in Victorian England.

== Biography ==
Preindlsberger was born in Graz, Styria. She first studied in Munich under Lindenschmit, and having been awarded a scholarship for her first picture, Mutterglück, she worked in France under Colin, Pascal Adolphe Jean Dagnan-Bouveret (1852–1929), and Gustave Courtois (1853–1923). She painted in the countryside and Paris, and, as with many other young painters, fell under the spell of the rustic naturalist Jules Bastien-Lepage. Her style continued to show his influence even when her subject matter changed from rustic to medieval romantic and biblical themes. While in France she met the Finnish painter Helene Schjerfbeck, in whose company she visited Pont-Aven in 1883.

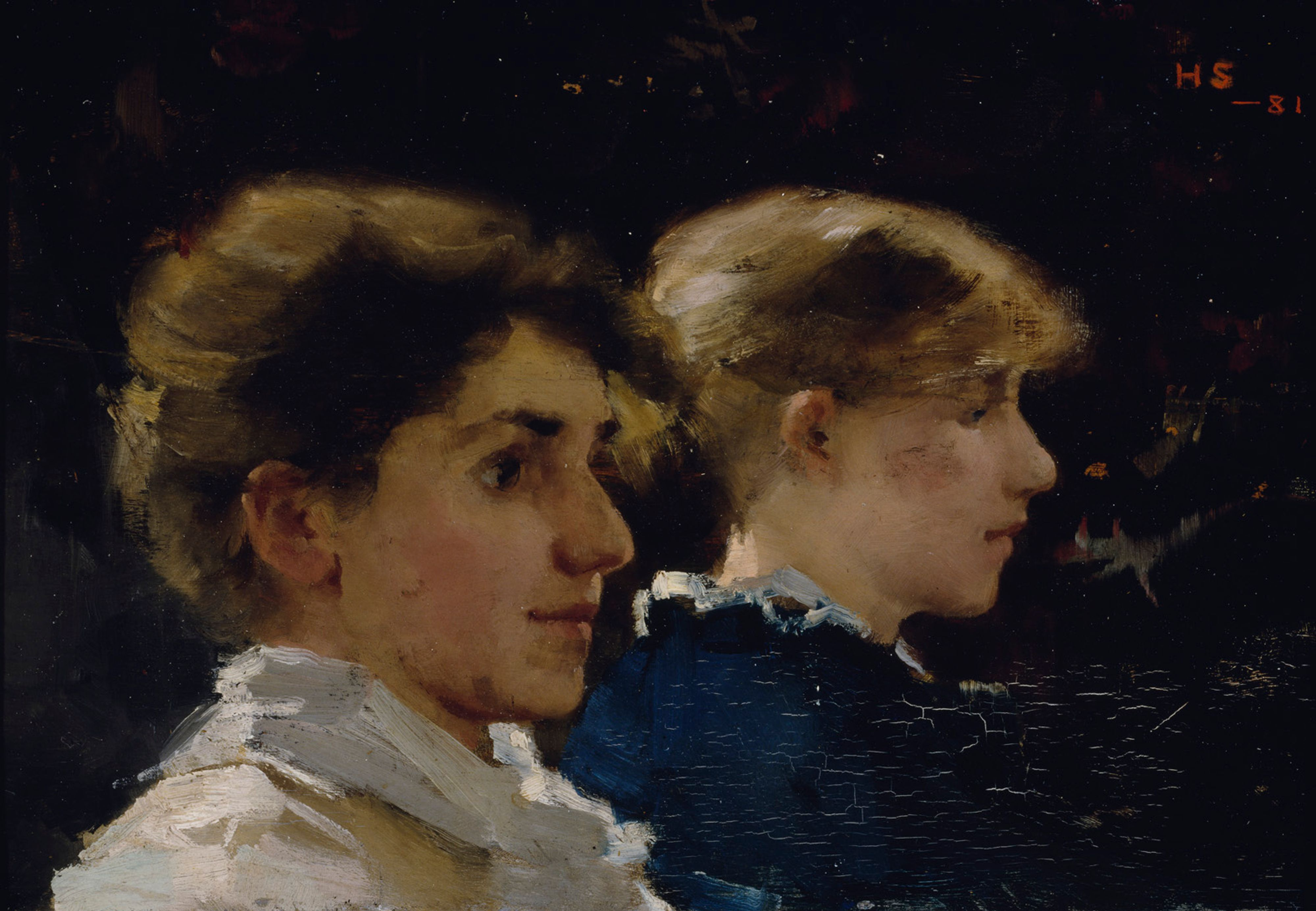
Stokes (in front), painted by Helene Schjerfbeck in 1881

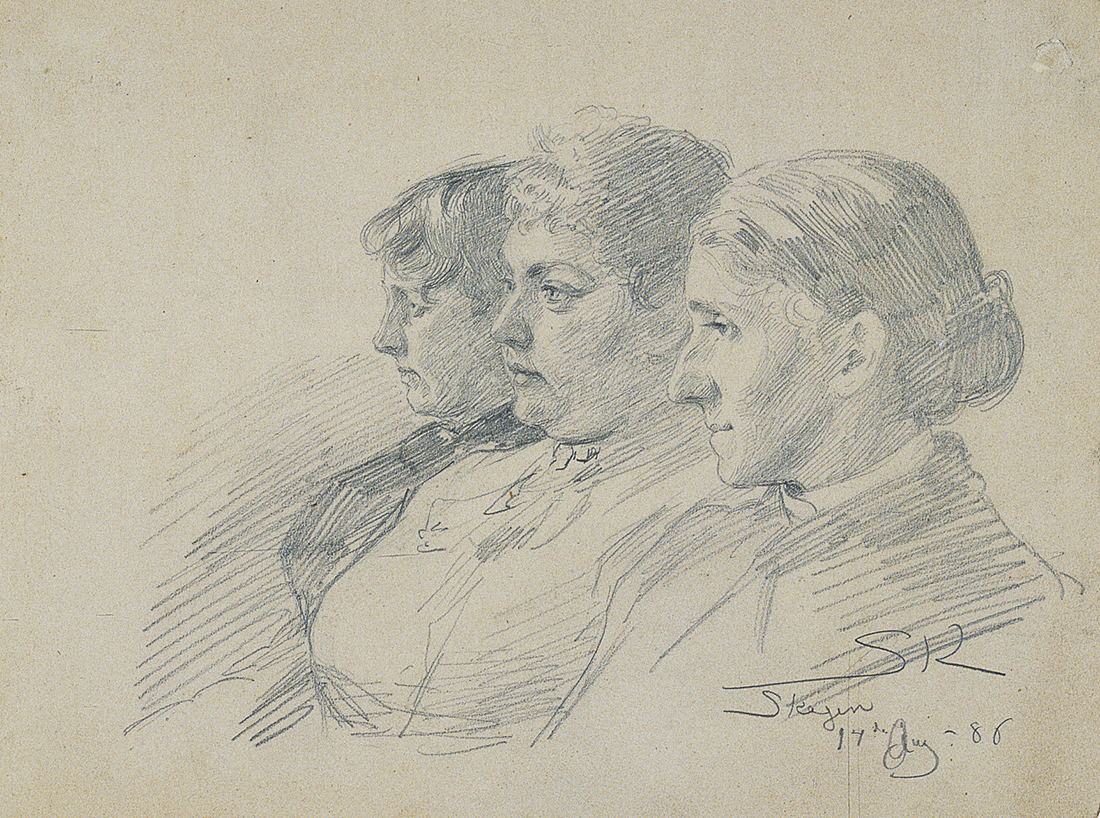
Vilhelmine Bramsen, Beatrice Diderichsen and Marianne Stokes (front) in Skagen, by Peder Severin Krøyer on 14 August 1886

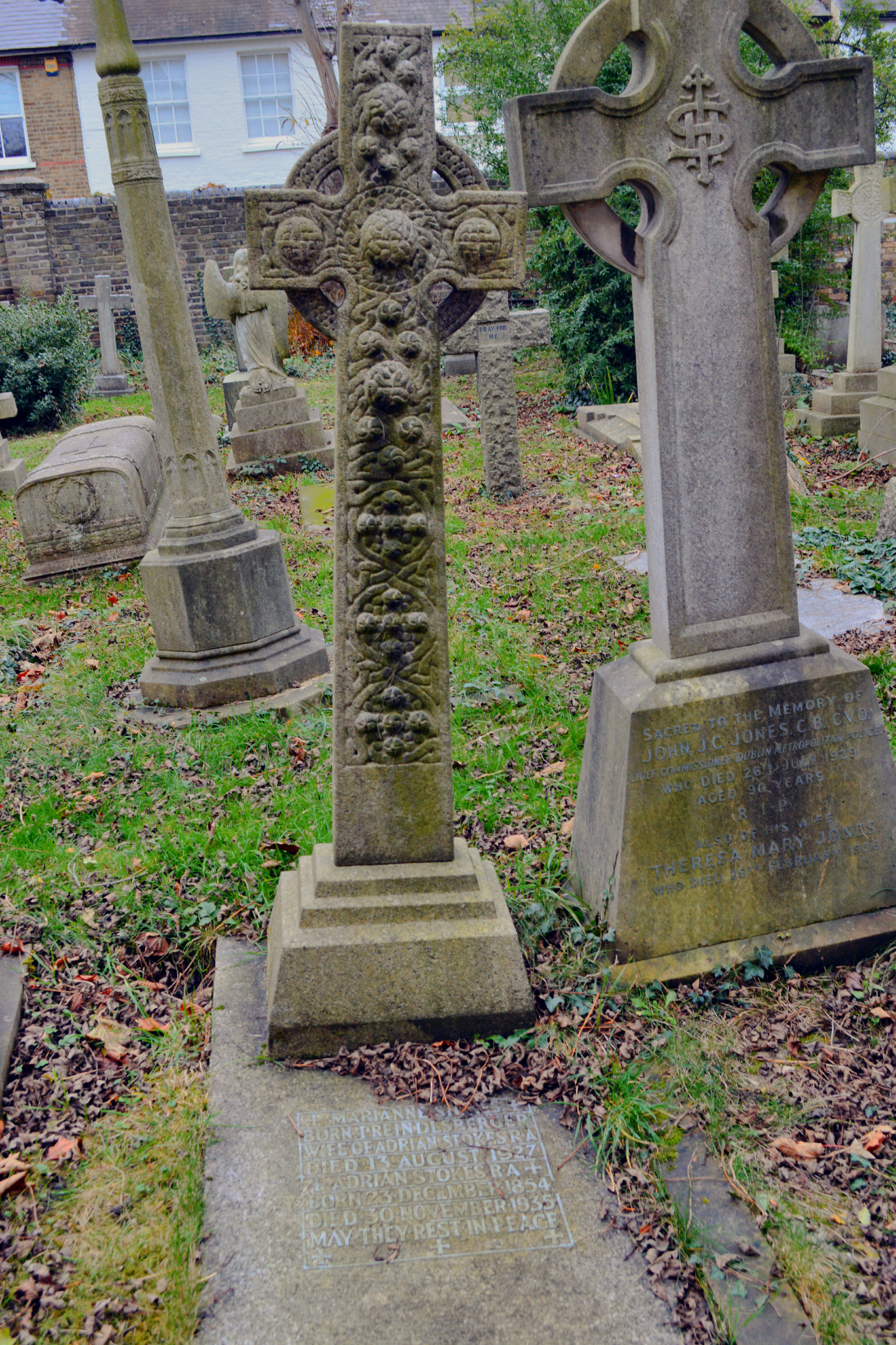
St Mary Magdalen, Mortlake

Her first salon painting, Reflection, which had been painted in Brittany, was exhibited in 1885 at the Royal Academy. Her work was also shown at the Grosvenor Gallery, New Gallery, and the Society of British Artists. In 1885, a year after her marriage, she took to using the name 'Mrs. Adrian Stokes'.

Together with her husband, she spent the summers of 1885 and 1886 at Skagen in the far north of Denmark where there was an artists' colony which became known as the Skagen Painters. There the couple struck up a close friendship with Michael and Anna Ancher. In summer 1885 they also visited Ireland.

Stokes exhibited her work at the Palace of Fine Arts at the 1893 World's Columbian Exposition in Chicago, Illinois.

She held a joint exhibition with her husband at the Fine Art Society in 1900. The Stokeses lived in St Ives where Marianne Stokes was a member of the Newlyn School. Having no children, they regularly travelled abroad, frequently to the Tyrol, and in 1905 to Hungary and the High Tatra. Here they spent about half a year sketching and painting in the villages of Važec, Mengusovce and Ždiar. Adrian Stokes concentrated on landscapes, with images of hay-harvesting and picturesque cottages, while Marianne Stokes painted portraits showing the fine detail of the garments. These paintings provide a valuable record of the Slovak culture.

Stokes abandoned oils, inspired by the Pre-Raphaelite movement, and prompted by the translation work of Christiana Herringham. She painted flat compositions in tempera and gesso, her paintings giving the impression of being frescoes on plaster surfaces. She was an Associate of the Royal Society of Painters in Water Colours. Stokes was included in the 2018 exhibit Women in Paris 1850-1900.

Marianne Stokes died during 1927. Adrian Stokes died during 1935. Both were buried at Mortlake Roman Catholic Cemetery, London.

== Selected paintings ==
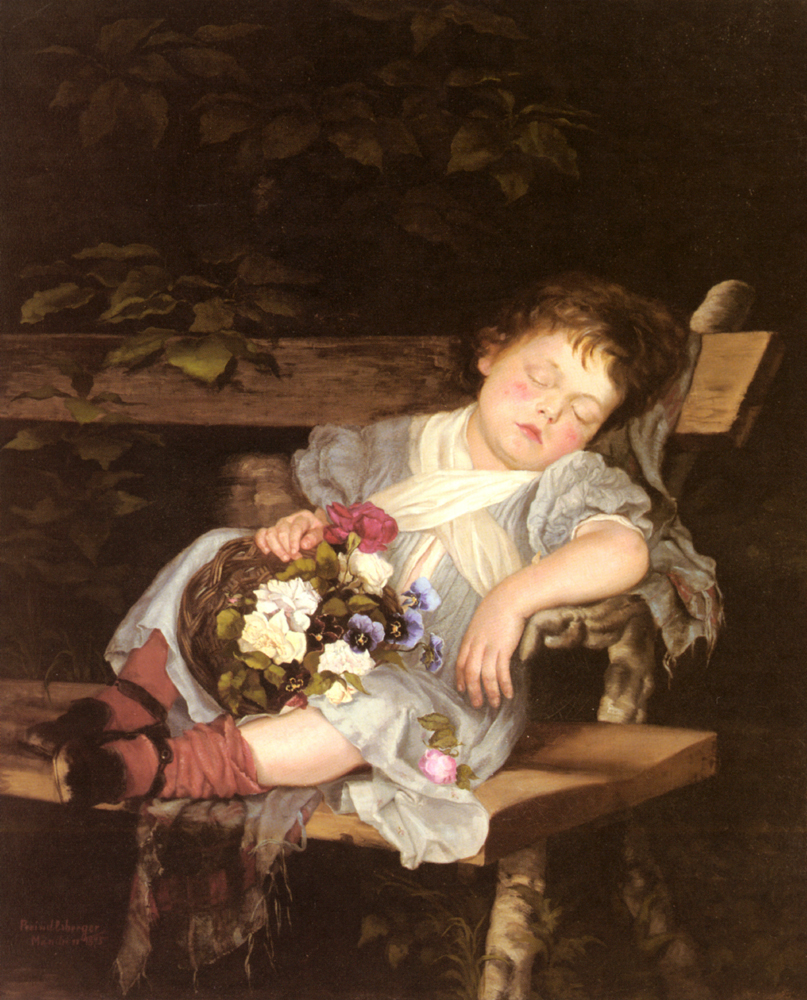
Sweet Dreams, 1875

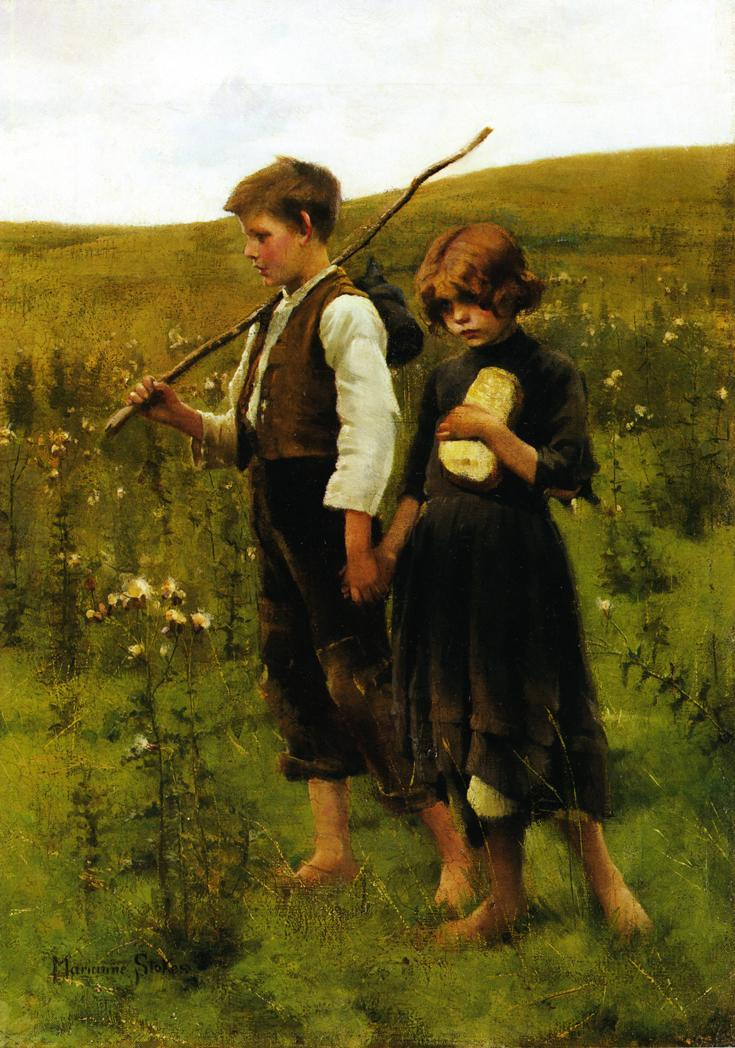
On the Way to the Fields, 1883–87

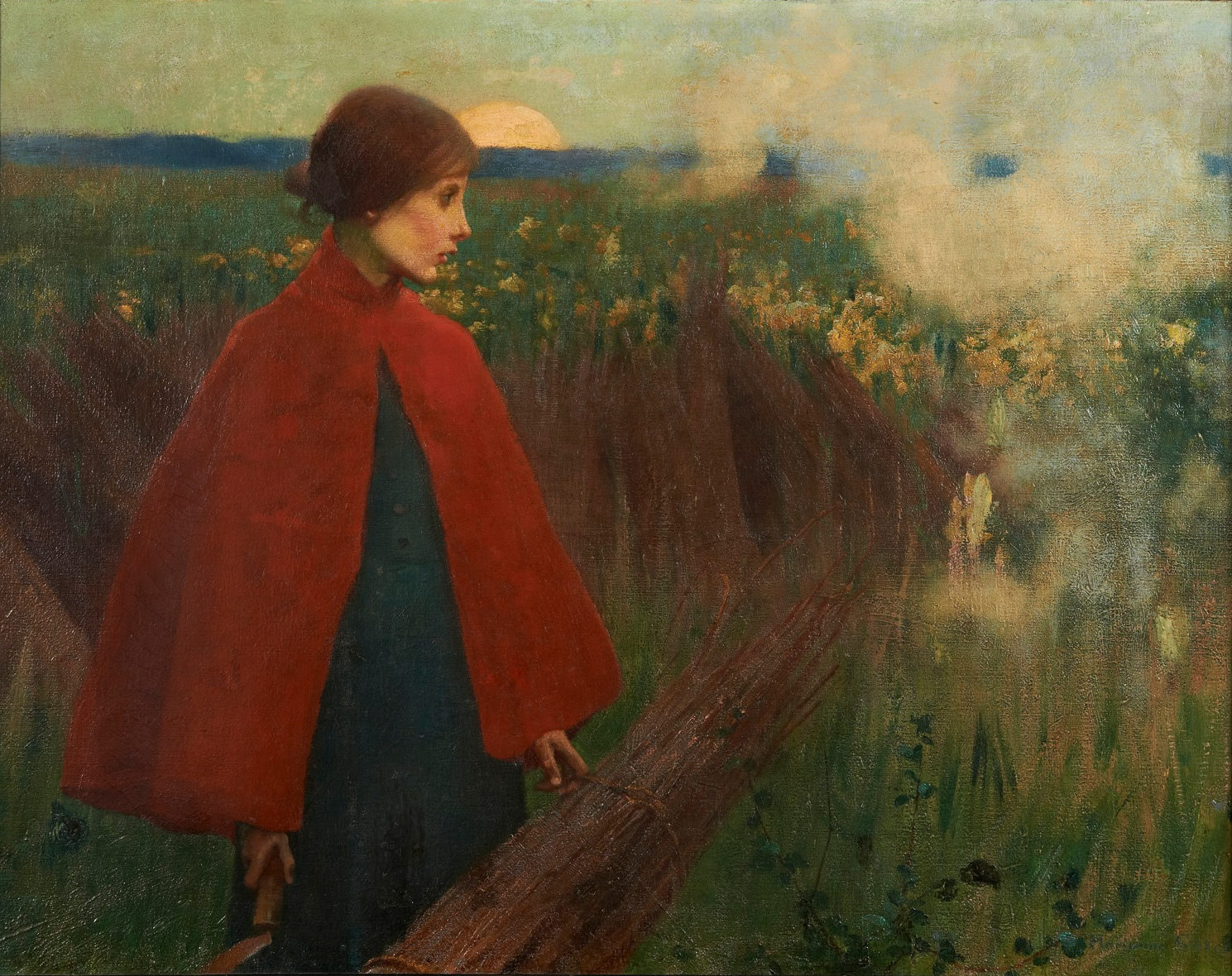
The Passing Train, 1890

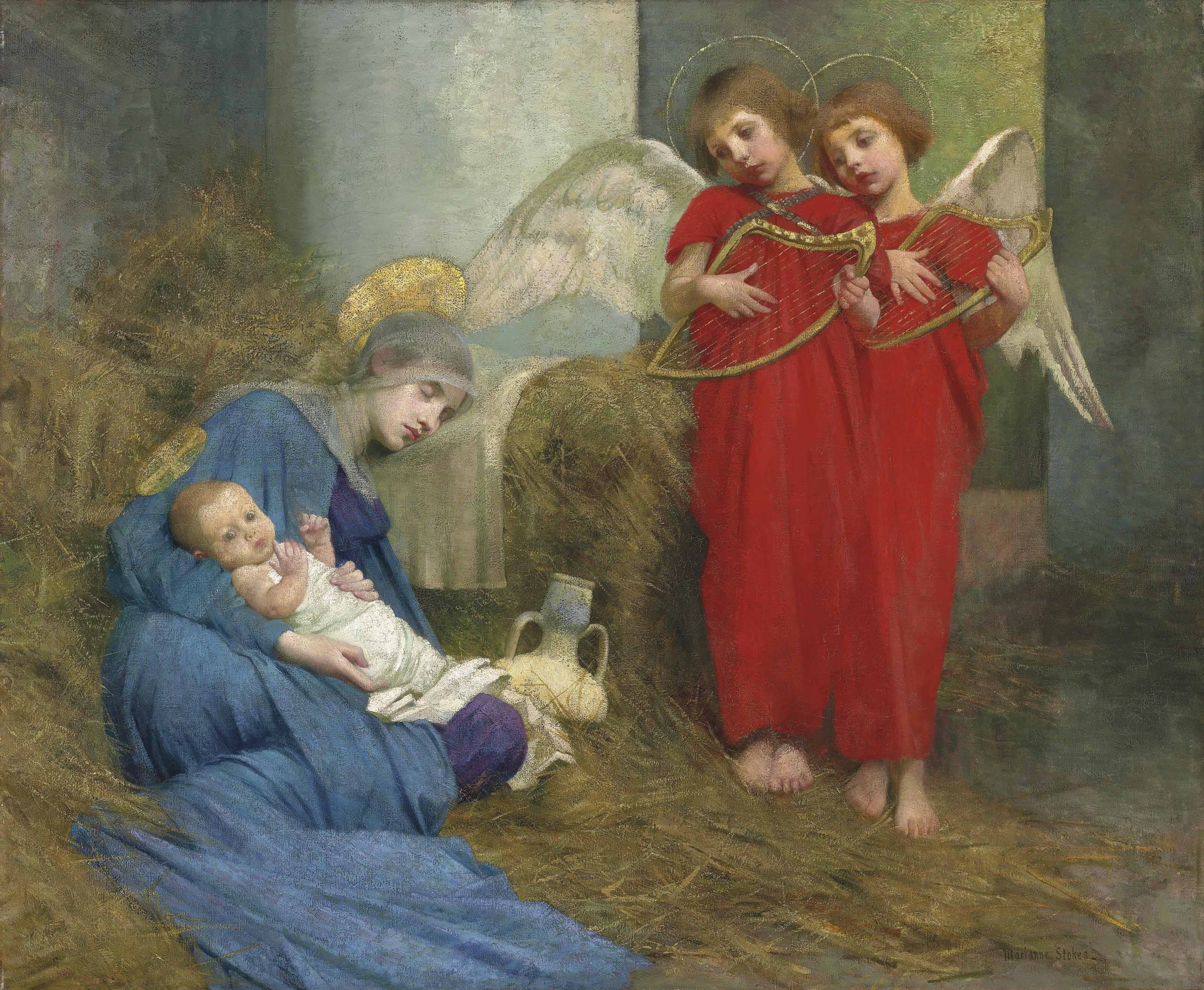
Angels Entertaining the Holy Child, 1893

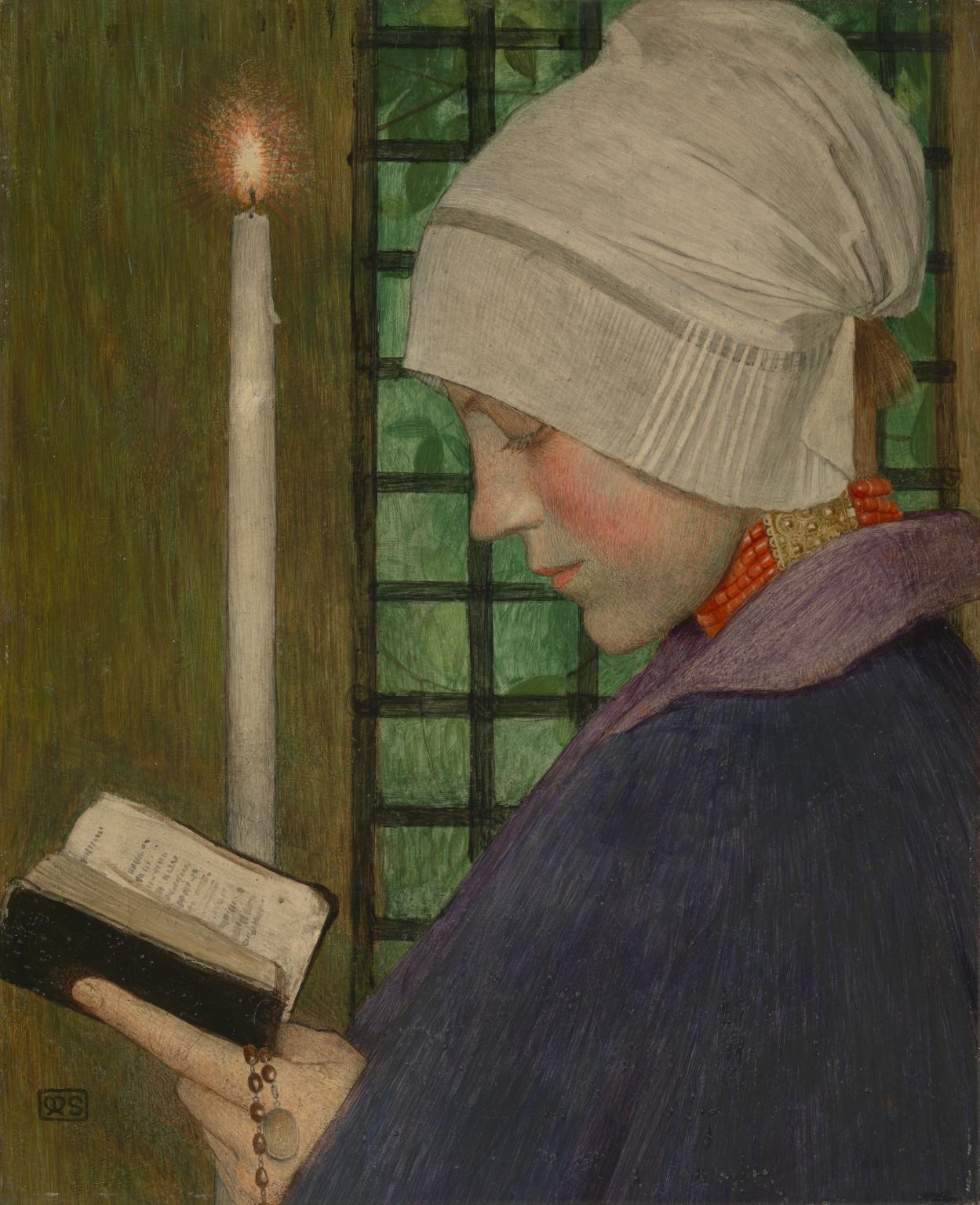
Candlemas Day, c. 1901

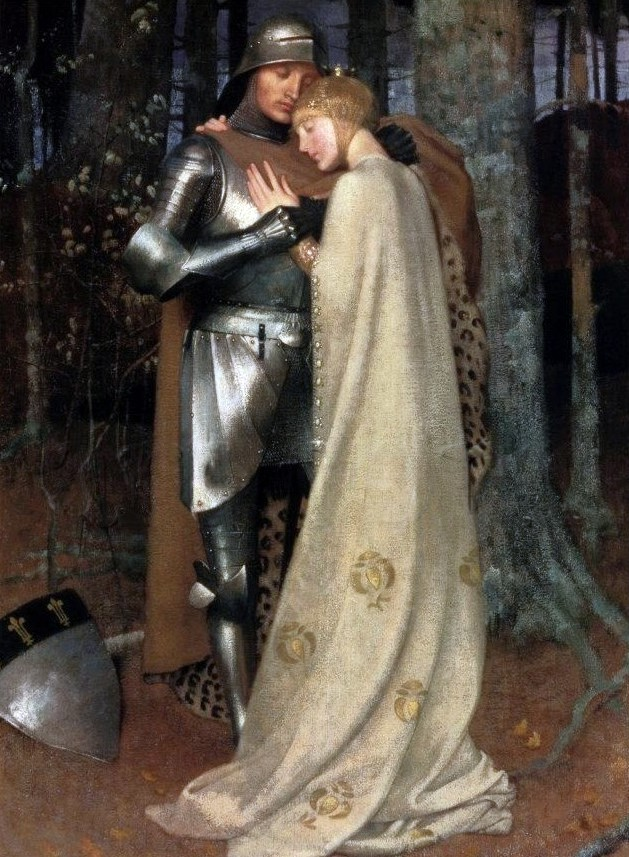
Aucassin and Nicolette, unknown date

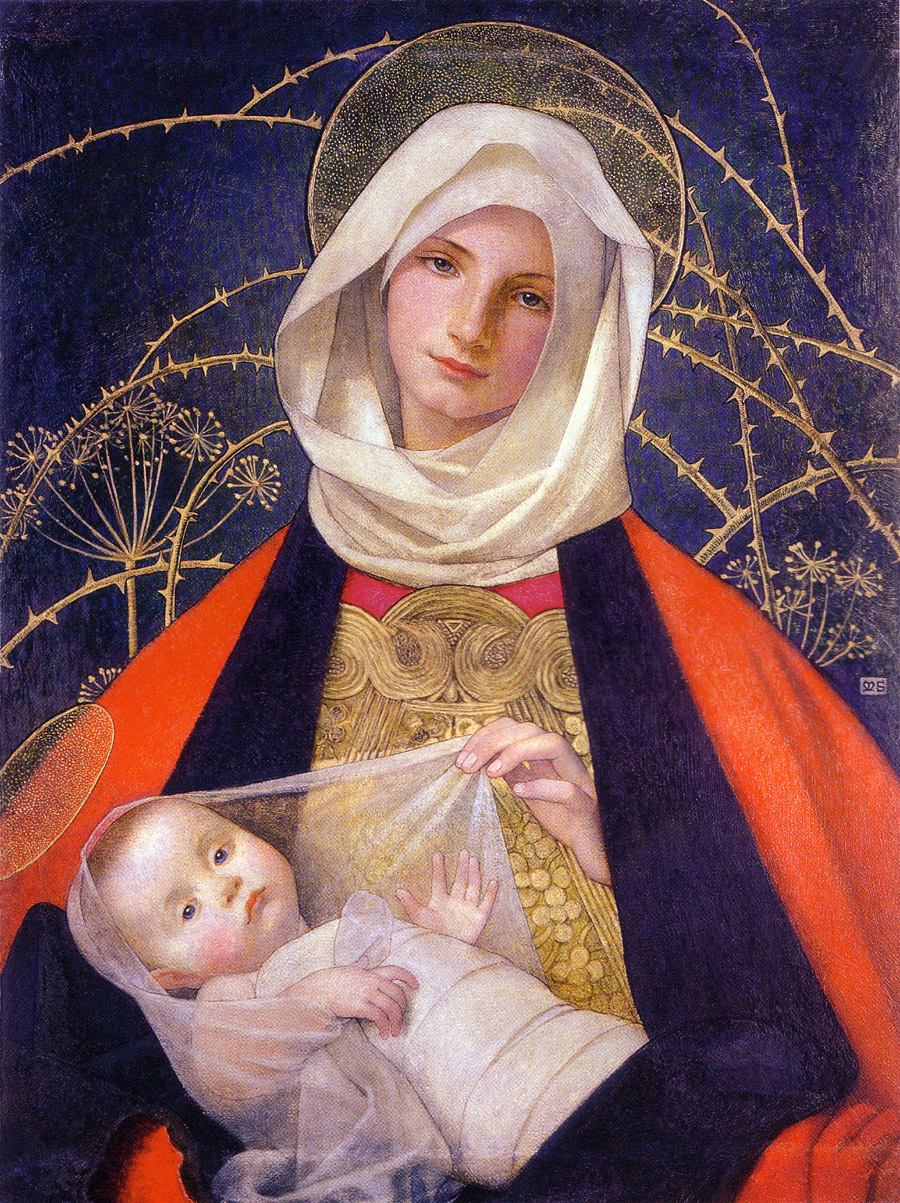
Madonna and Child, 1907–08, tempera on panel

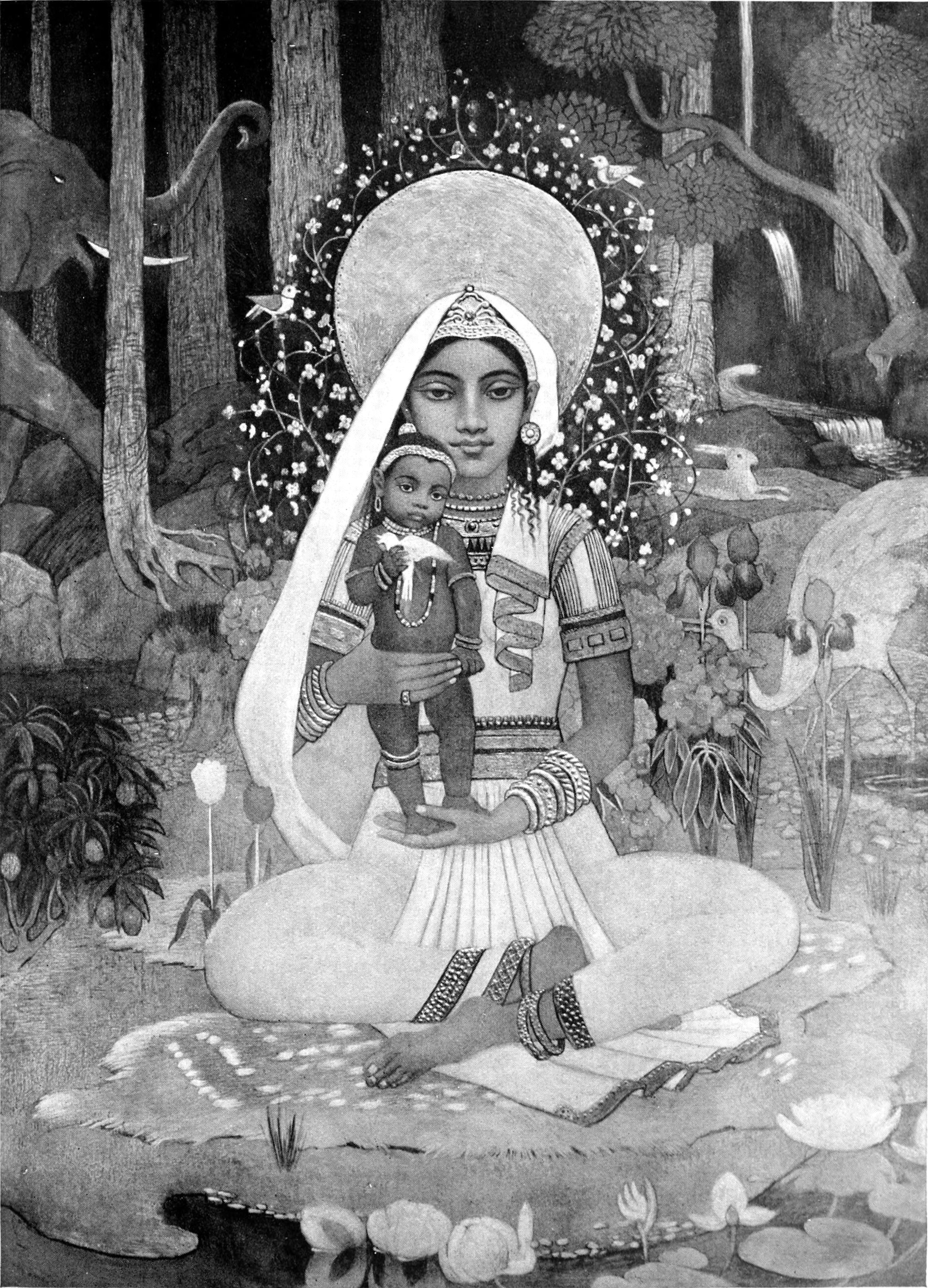
Devaki, Mother of Krishna, 1920

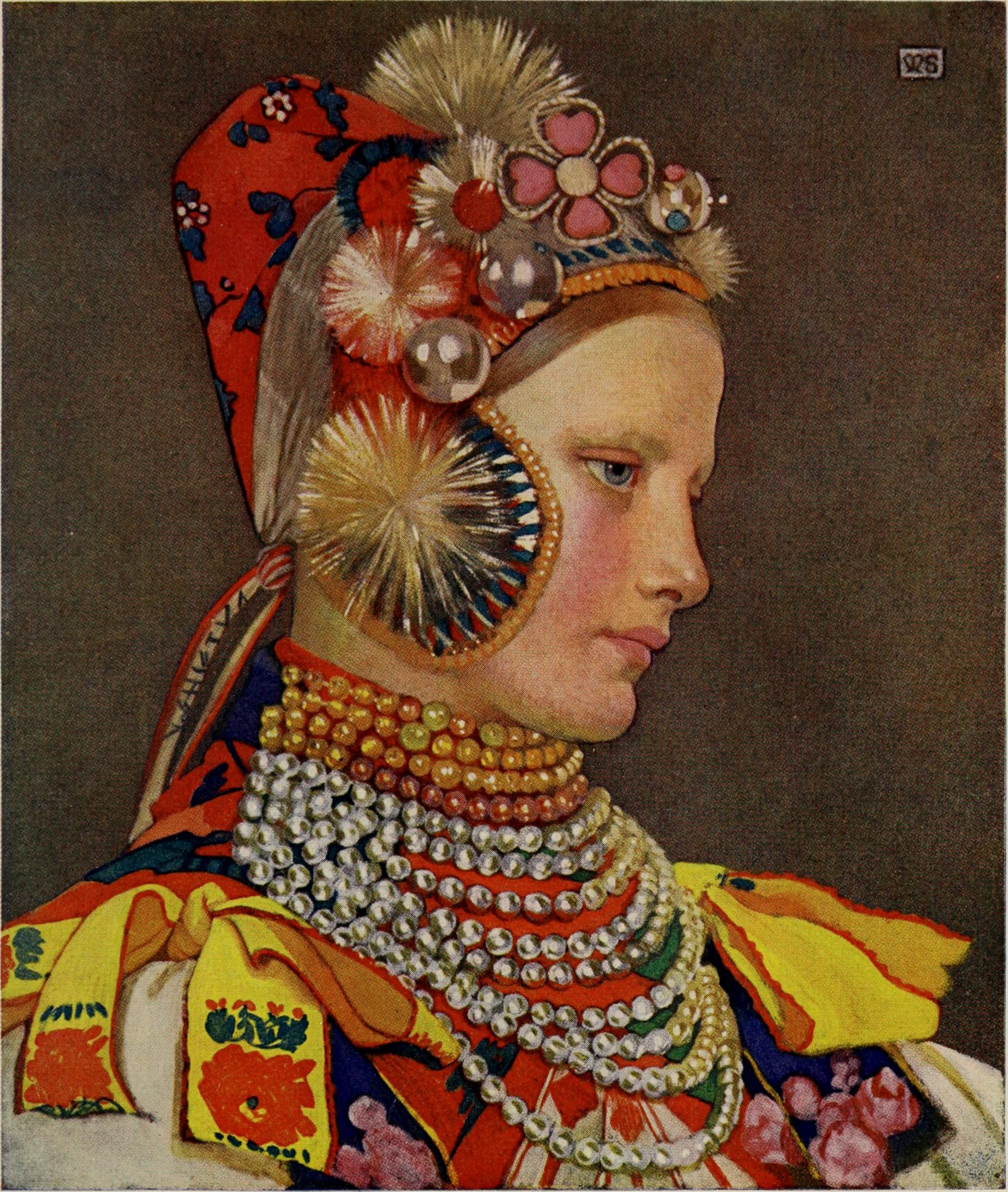
Slovak girl, 1909

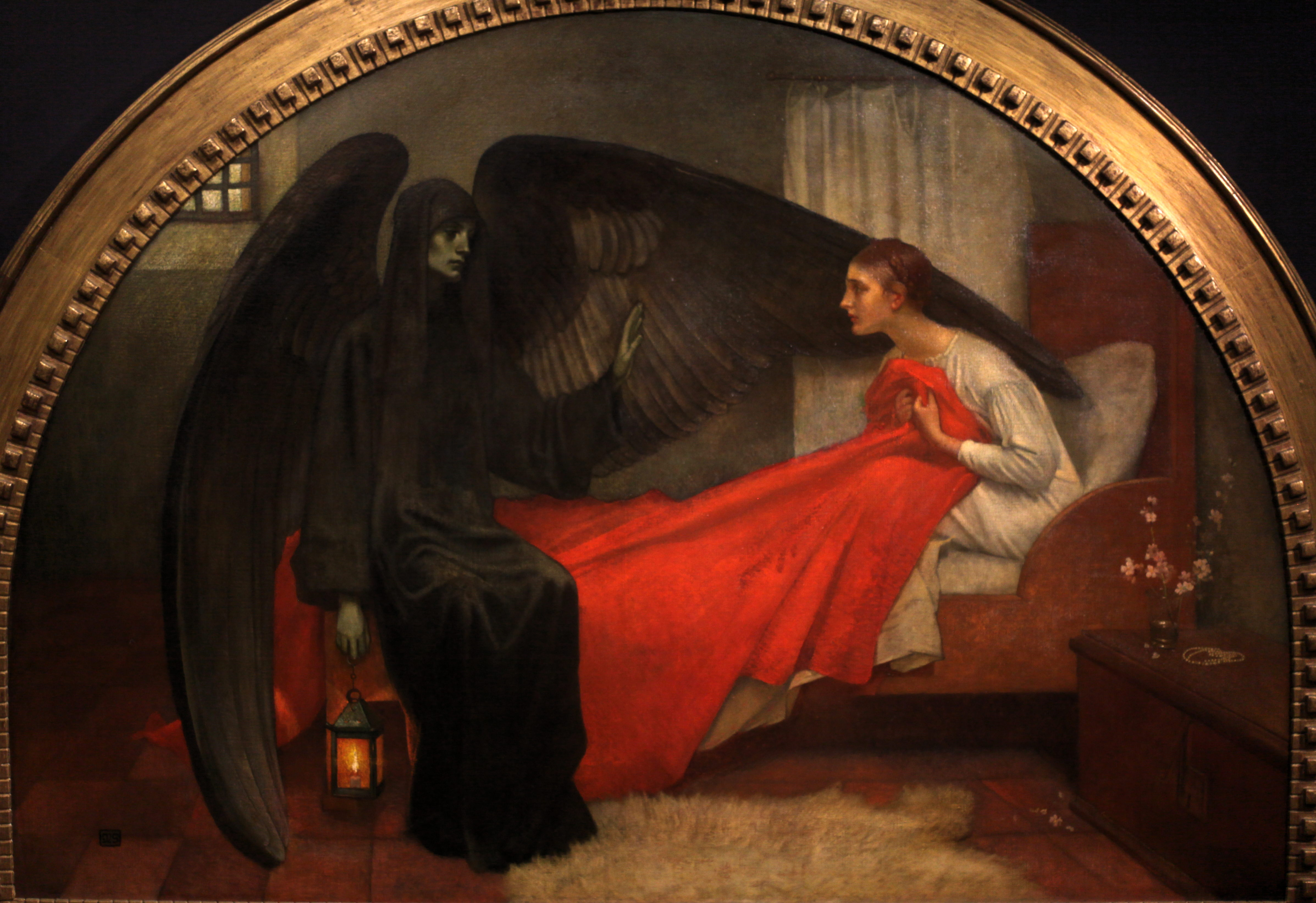
Death and the Maiden, ca. 1908

== Bibliography ==
- Evans, Magdalen (2009). Utmost fidelity: the painting lives of Marianne and Adrian Stokes. Sansom & Company. ISBN 978-1-906593-01-8.
- Hungary, Adrian and Marianne Stokes, (Adam and Charles Black, London, 1909), 75 colour full-page illustrations of Hungary and High Tatra
- Mevnell, Wilfred, "Mr and Mrs Adrian Stokes", in Art Journal, 1900.
