= Sarah Prideaux =

British bookbinder, designer, and writer (1853–1933)

- Born: Sarah Treverbian Prideaux; 1853; London
- Died: 1933 (aged 79–80); Kensington
- Known for: Bookbinding
- Notable work: Aquatint Engraving A Chapter in the History of Book Illustration; Modern Bookbindings Their Design and Decoration; Bookbinders and their Craft

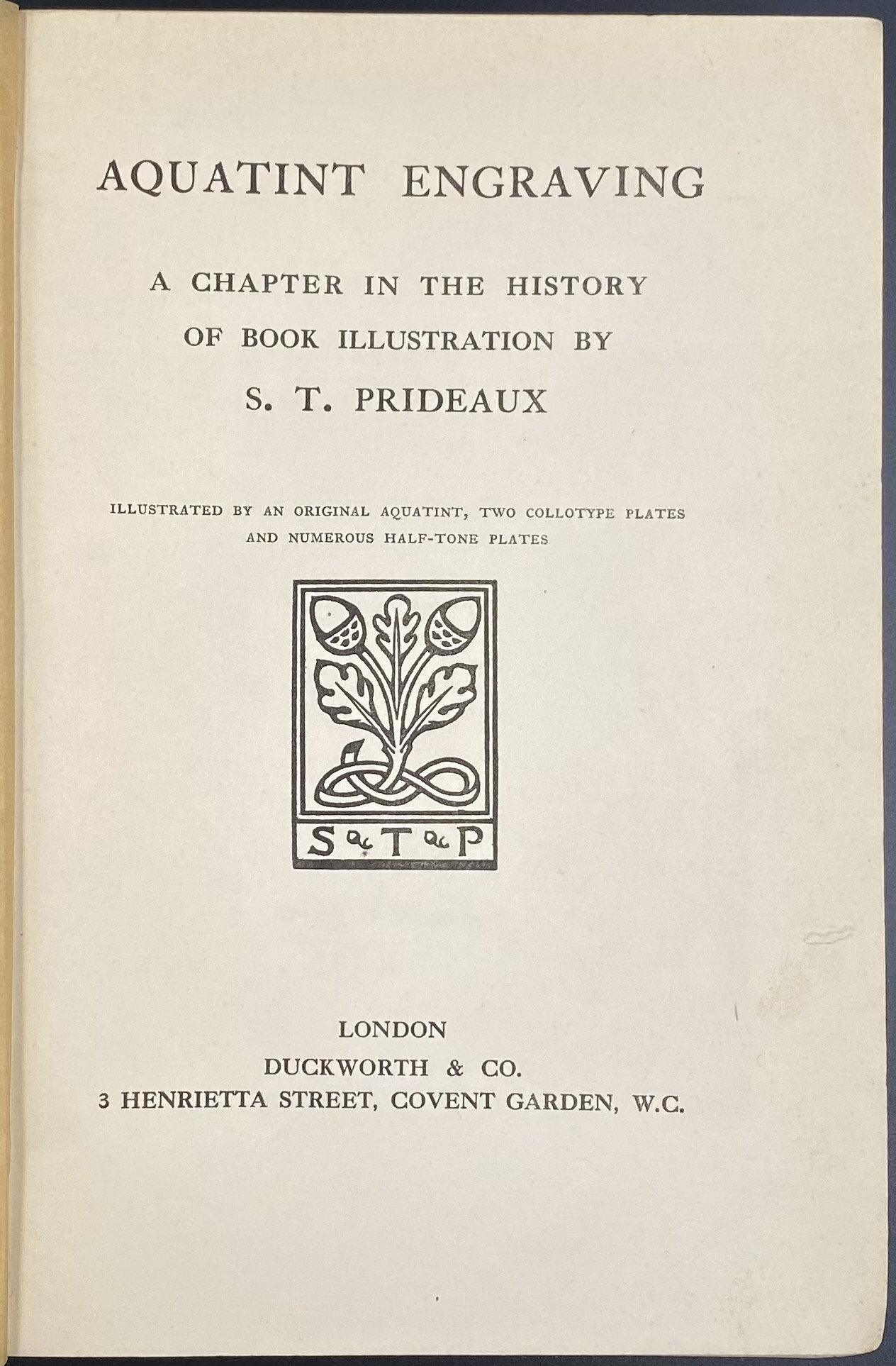

Sarah Treverbian Prideaux (1853–1933) was a bookbinder, teacher, historian and author of books on binding and illustration. She, along with Katharine Adams and Sybil Pye, was one of the noted women bookbinders of the period.

== Biography ==
Prideaux was born in London, England, one of five children born to Elizabeth Williams and Walter Prideaux.

In 1888, at the age of 35, she started lessons in bookbinding under Joseph Zaehnsdorf's son, Joseph W., and continued in Paris under Antoine Joly. For several years she experimented, wrote articles, produced bound books inspired by Art Nouveau designs, and showed in various exhibits. But in 1894, the quality of the bindings signed by Prideaux were notably produced at a professional level. It has since been discovered that although she designed the bindings, selected the leather and marbled endpapers to a very detailed specification, the actual bookbinding was carried out by a French tradesman, Lucien Broca, and possibly others under her name. Over 276 books were bound and published under her signature.

Throughout the 1890s, Prideaux, an expert on the history of bookbinding, taught, lectured, and wrote reviews and articles for journals and magazines. Her 1893 book An Historical Sketch of Bookbinding has an introductory chapter by E. Gordon Duff. Katharine Adams was one of Prideaux's students and close friend. Her articles were collected and published as "Bookbinders and their Craft". Her final book on bookbinding was "Modern Bookbindings Their Design and Decoration". She also wrote a book called "Aquatint Engraving A Chapter in the History of Book Illustration". She served as one of the directors of the Women's Printing Society.

She was very physically active, went on long bicycle rides through Europe, skied, and bobsledded, even into middle age. She died in Kensington in 1933 in her 80th year.

== Legacy ==
Prideaux's bindings are held by most major institutions and many private collectors.

- Boston Athenaeum in Boston, Massachusetts
- British Library
- Victoria and Albert Museum
- Duke University's Rubenstein Rare Book Library's Lisa Unger Baskin Collection
- Southern Methodist University's Bridwell Library
