= May Morris =

English artisan and embroidery designer

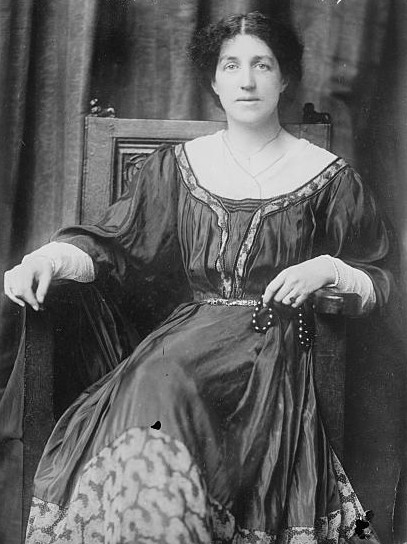
- May Morris, 1909
- Born: Mary Morris; 25 March 1862; Red House, Bexleyheath, England
- Died: 17 October 1938 (aged 76); Kelmscott Manor, Kelmscott, England
- Occupations: Embroidery designer, teacher, editor
- Known for: Arts and Crafts movement British Socialism
- Spouse: Henry Halliday Sparling (m. 1890; div. 1898)
- Partner: Mary Lobb (1917-1938)
- Parent(s): William Morris; Jane Morris
- Relatives: Jenny Morris (sister)

Mary "May" Morris (25 March 1862 – 17 October 1938) was an English artisan, embroidery designer, jeweller, socialist, and editor. She was the younger daughter of the Pre-Raphaelite artist and designer William Morris and embroiderer and artists' model Jane Morris (née Burden).

== Biography ==
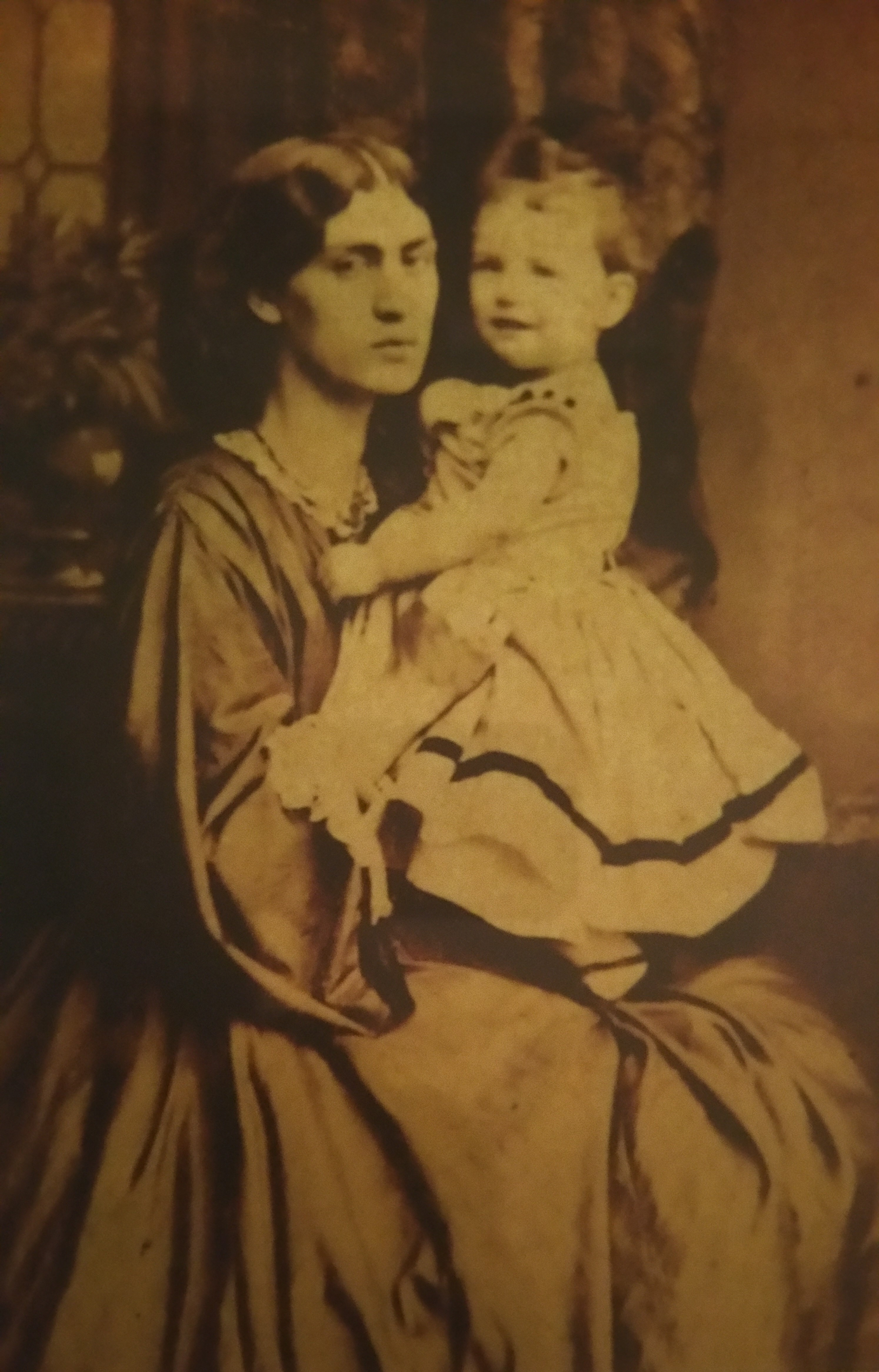
May Morris with her mother Jane, circa 1865

May Morris was born on 25 March 1862 at Red House, Bexleyheath, and named Mary, as she was born on the Feast of the Annunciation. May learned to embroider from her mother and her aunt Bessie Burden, who had been taught by William Morris. In 1878, she enrolled at the National Art Training School, precursor of the Royal College of Art. In 1885, aged 23, she became director of the embroidery department at her father's enterprise Morris & Co. During her time in the role she was responsible for producing a range of designs, which were frequently misattributed to her father. She ran this department until her father's death in 1896, where she moved into an advisory role.

In 1886, May fell in love with Henry Halliday Sparling (1860–1924), secretary of the Socialist League. Despite her mother's concerns about Sparling, they married on 14 June 1890 at Fulham Register Office. They were divorced in 1898, and May reverted to her maiden name.

In 1907, she founded the Women's Guild of Arts with Mary Elizabeth Turner, as the Art Workers' Guild did not admit women. They were assisted in its foundation by Mary Annie Sloane, Ethel Fanny Everett, Mabel Esplin, and Letty Graham. The Women's Guild of Arts became a leading association for women artists and craftswomen, providing networking and educational opportunities as an alternative to the Art Workers' Guild.

She edited her father's Collected Works in 24 volumes for Longmans, Green and Company, published from 1910 to 1915, and, after his death, commissioned two houses to be built in the style that he loved in the village of Kelmscott in the Cotswolds. Her companion at Kelmscott from 1917 until her death was Mary Lobb, a Women's Land Army volunteer in the village.

May Morris died at Kelmscott Manor on 17 October 1938.

== Embroidery ==
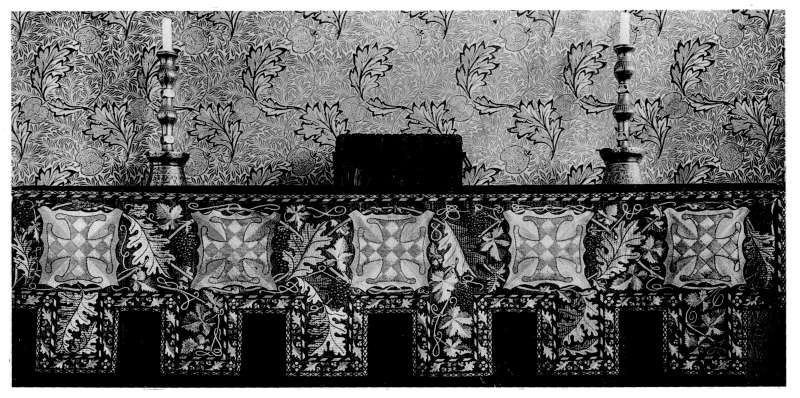
Embroidered Altar frontal, executed by May Morris from a design by Philip Webb.

May Morris was an influential embroiderer and designer, although her contributions are often overshadowed by those of her father, a towering figure in the Arts and Crafts movement. She continued his resurrection of free-form embroidery in the style which would be termed art needlework. Art needlework emphasized freehand stitching and delicate shading in silk thread thought to encourage self-expression in the needleworker, in sharp contrast with the brightly-coloured Berlin wool work needlepoint and its "paint by numbers" aesthetic which had gripped much of home embroidery in the mid-19th century.

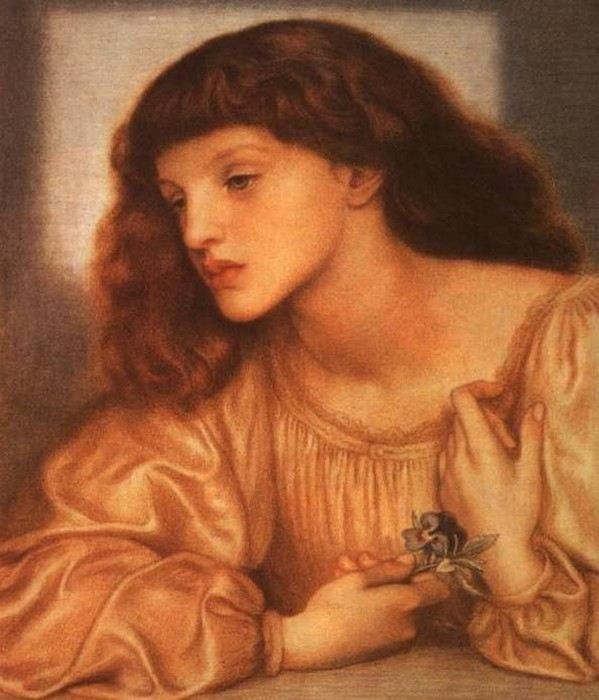
May Morris, 1872, by Dante Gabriel Rossetti.

May Morris was also active in the Royal School of Art Needlework (now Royal School of Needlework), founded as a charity in 1872 under the patronage of Princess Helena to maintain and develop the art of needlework through structured apprenticeships. The school originally opened in the autumn of 1872 in rooms in Sloane Street, London, with a staff of twenty women overseen by Lady Welby and Mrs. Dolby, an "authority in ecclesiastical work." The school grew rapidly, and by 1903 had moved into their third locale, located in Exhibition Road next to the South Kensington Museum.

Also among the staff at the RSAN were Jane Morris's sister, Elizabeth Burden, who was chief technical instructor from 1880, and designer Nellie Whichelo.

May Morris taught embroidery at the LCC Central School of Art in London from 1897, and was head of the embroidery department from 1899 until 1905, thereafter continuing her association with the Central School as Visitor until 1910. She also taught at Birmingham, Leicester, and Hammersmith art schools.

By 1916, there were many art schools under the LCC umbrella that included embroidery in their curriculum. Among the embroidery instructors were sisters Ellen Mary Wright and Fanny Isobel Wright, both previously employed in the embroidery department at Morris & Co., and trained by May Morris.

== Jewellery ==
Morris also designed and made jewellery. She began to design jewellery around the turn of the 20th century, and was probably inspired by the Birmingham jewellers Arthur and Georgie Gaskin, who were old family friends. Examples of her jewellery were donated by Mary Lobb to the Victoria and Albert Museum and Amgueddfa Cymru – Museum Wales.

== Publications ==
- Decorative Needlework. London: Joseph Hughes & Co., 1893.
- Collected Works of William Morris (ed.). 24 volumes. London: Longmans, Green, 1910–1915.
- "Coptic Textiles". The Architectural Review 5 (1899), 274–287.
- "Chain Stitch Embroidery". The Century Guild Hobby Horse 3 (1888), 25–29.
- "Line Embroidery". The Art Workers' Quarterly 1:4 (October 1902), 117–121.
- "Opus Anglicanum – The Syon Cope". The Burlington Magazine 6 (October 1904 – March 1905), 278–285.
- "Opus Anglicanum II – The Ascoli Cope". The Burlington Magazine 6 (October 1904 – March 1905), 440–448.
- "Opus Anglicanum III – The Pienza Cope". The Burlington Magazine 7 (April–September 1905), 54–65.
- "Opus Anglicanum at the Burlington Fine Arts Club". The Burlington Magazine 7 (April–September 1905), 302–309.
- "William Morris". The Times Literary Supplement 905 (22 May 1919).
- "William Morris". The Times Literary Supplement 1685 (17 May 1934).

== Exhibitions ==
In 2026 there was an exhibition of her work in the Lady Lever Art Gallery that included some of her paintings, embroidery, and designs.
