= Christiana Herringham =

British painter

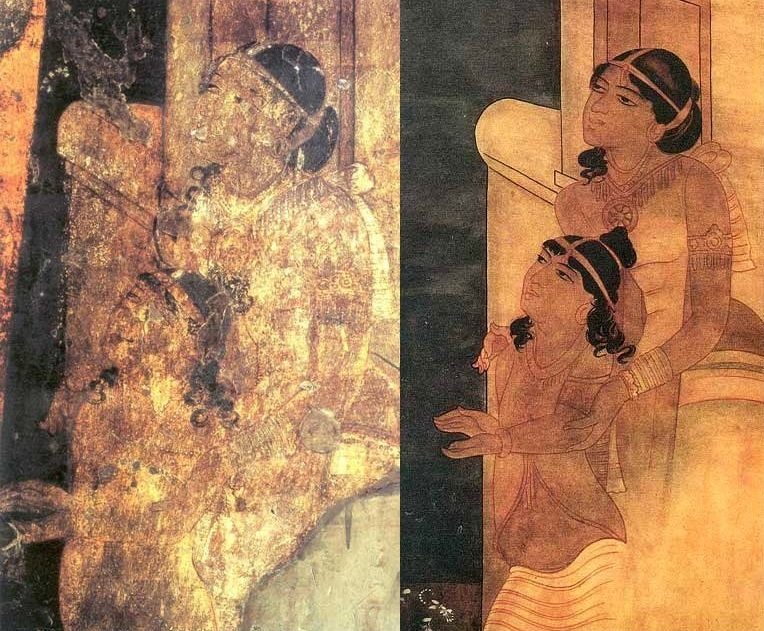
A detail: original left, 1915 copy by Lady Herringham right

Christiana Jane Herringham, Lady Herringham (née Powell; 1852–1929) was a British artist, copyist, and art patron. She is noted for her part in establishing the National Art Collections Fund in 1903 to help preserve Britain's artistic heritage. In 1910 Walter Sickert wrote of her as "the most useful and authoritative critic living".

== Background ==
Christiana Jane Powell was born in Kent and was the daughter of Thomas Wilde Powell, a wealthy patron of the Arts and Crafts Movement. One of her siblings was Mary Elizabeth Turner. From shortly after her mother's death in 1871, to her marriage, she ran her father's household. After a courtship in 1878 and 1879 marked by tension between her independence and his conventional Anglican upbringing, she married the physician Wilmot Herringham in 1880, with whom she had two sons.

== Interests 1880–1900 ==
From 1880 to 1890, Herringham was a director of the Ladies Residential Chambers Co. She was one of its founders, with Agnes Garrett.

Herringham encountered fresco work by William Dyce in All Saints, Margaret Street, a setting significant in her courtship. She experimented with tempera recipes, of pigment mixed with egg yolk, and translated Cennino Cennini's authoritative book on the old techniques. She worked as a copyist of Italian tempera paintings in galleries, and an anecdote was told about her meeting John Ruskin while copying a Piero di Cosimo in the National Gallery, London. G. C. Williamson wrote in 1900 that ""It is quite clear from Mrs Herringham's work, that tempera painting [...] is quite capable of the sort transparent effects which are to be seen in Perugino's paintings [...]".

Her paintings had much in common with what has been called "a late provincial renaissance of Pre-Raphaelite and Symbolist art" based in Birmingham, facets of the "Tempera Revival". Independent of the Birmingham group were John D. Batten and John Roddam Spencer Stanhope who also revived and worked in tempera.

Her father, who had passed money to his children during his lifetime, died in 1897, and Herringham became wealthy. She gave money to Newnham College, Cambridge at the end of the century. Mary Bateson of Newnham was a scholar and suffragist, and a friend, and Herringham found some money for her at the beginning of the 20th century when Bateson was considering emigration to the USA.

== Suffrage ==
Herringham was committed to women's suffrage from 1889. Bertha Newcombe of the Artists' Suffrage League (ASL) was a friend, and Christiana took part in her letter-writing campaign in 1908.

=== Publications ===
The death of Jessie Boucherett in 1905, who had founded and given financial support to The Englishwoman's Review, a feminist journal, undermined a publication that had appeared for nearly 40 years, and lasted to 1910. Her will left a lump sum, which was run down. In 1906 Herringham founded the Women's Tribune tabloid before she went to India. It was short-lived, lasting four months, but reported in detail on the Women's Social and Political Union. Explicitly it was the organ of the Women's Declaration Committee, associated with Clementina Black. The publication was recreated as Women and Progress by Nora Vynne and was published until 1914.

Herringham also supported the launch in 1909 of The Englishwoman by the Women's League of Suffrage Societies. She published in it "Travel Sketches of Indian Women" in 1909, and "A Visit to a Purdah Hospital" in 1910. It was published from January 1909 by Grant Richards, initially edited by his wife Elisina. In April 1909 Mary Lowndes took it over, as Herringham specified. It continued to 1921.

=== Banners ===
Christiana Herringham made banners for suffragist groups: for ASL, and the Women Writers' Suffrage League, in particular. The latter was designed by Mary Lowndes, and carried in the 1908 procession organised by the National Union of Women's Suffrage Societies, in which 800 banners were seen. It carried the Latin tag litera scripta manet, part of the saying vox audita perit litera scripta manet. The former was for the ASL, formed in 1907, and involved in production of suffragist materials designed to bring about change. The stitching of the banner was in part the work of Herringham, and its slogan "Alliance not Defiance" implied an appeal for male assistance.

Herringham supplied textiles and silk from India for banners: another one on which she worked, carrying the words "Post Laborum Palma", is not known to be extant. The procession in London on 13 June 1908, from the edge of the city to the Albert Hall, met with criticism: Herringham dealt sharply with Oswald Crawfurd, who complained from Switzerland.

== Art interests 1901–1907 ==
Herringham was involved in founding the Society of Painters in Tempera in 1901. It had little impact on academic painters, but influenced Joseph Southall. The members included Mary Sargant Florence and Margaret Gere; the Society flourished to around 1909, and had around 50 members, holding exhibitions in 1901, 1905 and 1909. It merged into a new Mural Decorators' Society in 1912.

The National Art Collections Fund had a quiet inception in June 1903, when Christiana Herringham recruited Roger Fry, Dugald Sutherland MacColl and Claude Phillips. With the exception of Phillips, who was in bad health, they met on 7 July at 40 Wimpole Street, the Herringham's London home: others invited were John Postle Heseltine, Charles Holroyd, John Bowyer Buchanan Nichols, Robert Clermont Witt and Lord Balcarres. They represented business (Heseltine) and politics (Balcarres) as well as the art world. Balcarres gravitated to the position of chairman of a provisional committee, and Herringham provided some working funds, but there were tensions: between Herringham and her cousin Witt, and over the participation of other women. At the first General Meeting of the Fund in November, Fry moved a protest amendment, seconded by Herringham, aimed at the exclusion of key early founders from the executive committee. Balcarres tried hard to smooth over the schism between Witt and Isidore Spielmann on one side, and Fry, MacColl and Phillips on the other. With these issues barely contained backstage, Heseltine set out to acquire the Rokeby Venus for the National Gallery, London, the purchase that established the Fund in British cultural life. In 1904 Herringham was one of the backers found by Fry to re-finance The Burlington Magazine.

In 1907, Herringham was one of the founders of the Women's Guild of Arts.

== India ==
In 1906, the Herringhams made a trip to India. Christiana subsequently became involved in the promotion of Indian art in the UK through her friendship with William Rothenstein. She was also on good terms with Ananda Coomaraswamy, interested in promoting Indian art in the United Kingdom but otherwise rather isolated. Ernest Havell and Rothenstein formed the India Society and Herringham joined the committee, the only female member of it at the time. The Society would often meet at her home at 40 Wimpole Street in London. Her husband became Chair of the India Society committee in 1914.

Herringham travelled to India again in 1911, and made copies of the Buddhist cave paintings at Ajanta near Aurangabad, which had deteriorated. Among the visitors who observed her work was William Rothenstein. An exhibition of the copies opened at the Crystal Palace in London in June 1911. Following the formation of the Society, Herringham returned to the Ajanta caves with Rothenstein. She set up a camp with the help of the Nizam of Hyderabad, and with several artists (including Dorothy Larcher) set about copying the frescoes.

The Russian-French art historian Victor Goloubew (fr:Victor Goloubew) and his assistant, the French writer Charles Müller (fr:Charles Müller (écrivain)), participated in the project, but the working relationship was fraught. Sister Nivedita arranged for Nandalal Bose and other pupils of Abanindranath Tagore to assist with the work at Ajanta, which had an influence on mural projects based on Havell's teaching in Calcutta. She visited the site, with Jagadish Bose, and also brought Lady Minto, wife of Lord Minto who was Viceroy to 1910. Another artist from Bengal involved at Ajanta was Asit Kumar Haldar. There were also two students from Hyderabad.

== Later life ==
Herringham, however, had begun to suffer from delusions of pursuit and persecution. In 1914, she returned to the UK and was admitted to mental institutions. She spent the rest of her life in private nursing homes. She died in Sussex in 1929.

== Works ==
- Translation of Il libro dell'arte by Cennino Cennini, 1899. Herringham had taken up the cause of the revival of tempera painting, and this translation from Italian of Cennini's 15th century treatise was a replacement for the 1844 translation by Mary Merrifield. It used the edition in Italian by Carlo and Gaetano Milanesi, and the German translation by Albert Ilg; and became the standard version in English for a generation. The work influenced Marianne Stokes.
- Ajanta Frescoes: Being Reproductions in Colour and Monochrome of Frescoes in Some of the Caves at Ajanta After Copies Taken in the Years 1909-1911 by Lady Herringham and Her Assistants (1915)

== Legacy ==
Wilmot Herringham left the couple's art collection, and a number of Christiana's paintings, to Bedford New College and to Newnham College. Royal Holloway, University of London now owns a large collection of Herringham's works, of those originally left to Bedford New College, remaining in the Picture Gallery and archive.

== Family ==
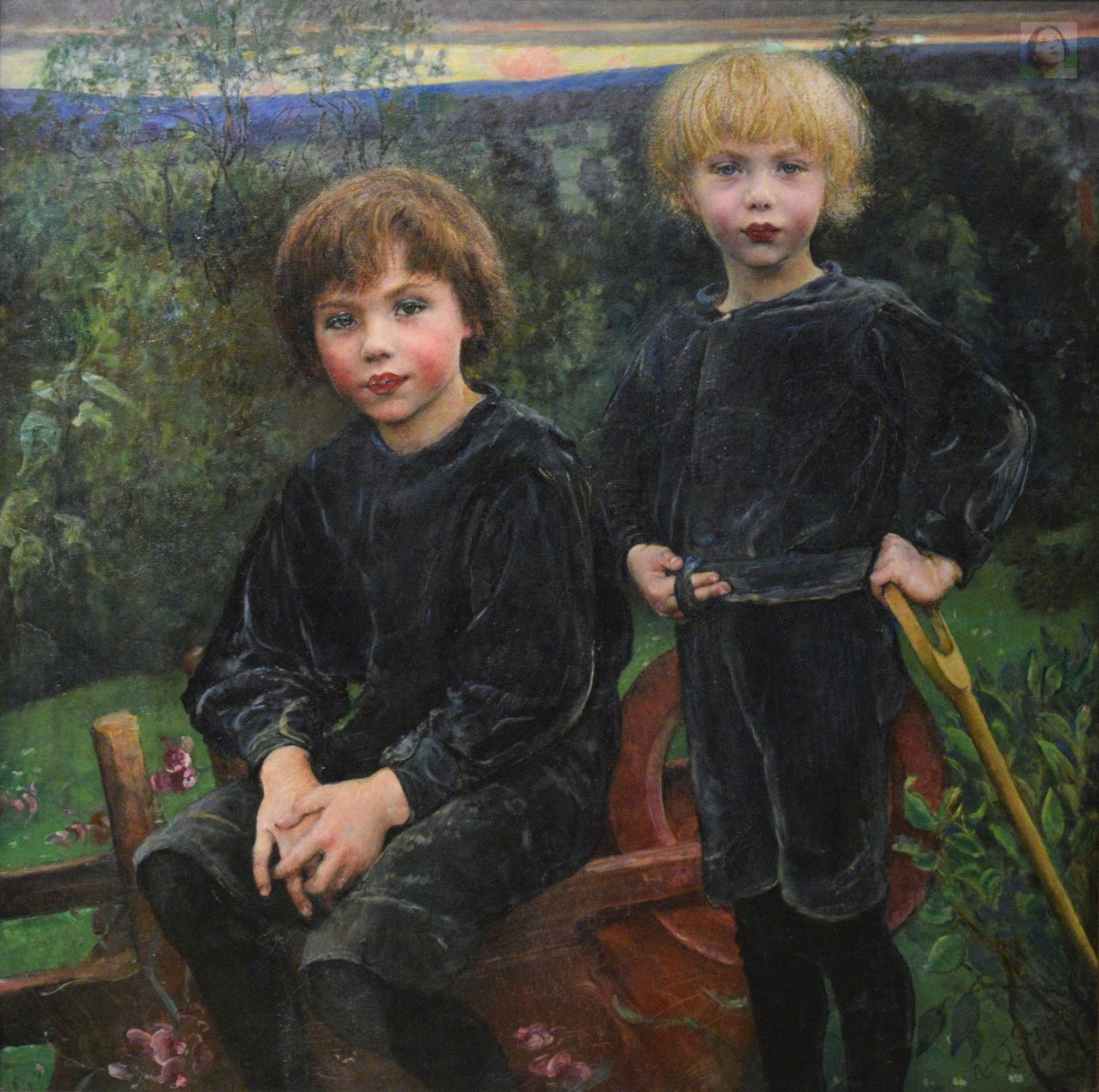
Geoffrey and Christopher Herringham, 1889 double portrait by Annie Swynnerton

Christiana and Wilmot Herringham had two sons. Christopher (1882–1893) died of rheumatoid arthritis. Geoffrey (1883–1914) was a professional soldier, killed at the Battle of Messines at the beginning of World War I.

== In literature ==
Her biographer Mary Lago suggests Christiana Herringham may have been the inspiration for Mrs Moore in E. M. Forster's 1924 novel A Passage to India. The Herringhams were family friends of the Forsters, through Forster's Aunt Laura; and Forster dined with Wilmot Herringham, William Rothenstein and Rabindranath Tagore in 1912, before his journey to India. Lago makes a case that the Adela Quested character in the novel is based on a travelling companion of the Herringhams on their 1906 voyage out.
