= Pass of Killiecrankie =

Coordinates: 56°44′03″N 3°46′23″W

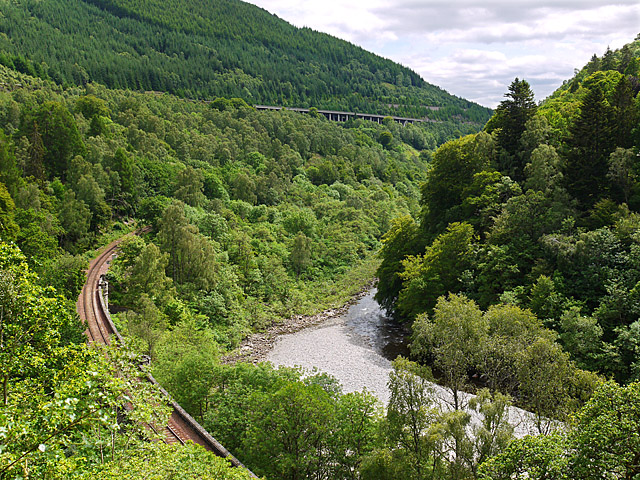
The Pass of Killicrankie

Scene on the Tummel, Perthshire by Thomas Creswick, 1844. The Pass of Killiecrankie is in the distance

The Pass of Killiecrankie is a gorge at the lower end of Glen Garry in Atholl, Scotland. It leads from Glen Garry into Strath Tummel. The A9 Road, the Highland Main Line, and a former military road all run through the pass. The village of Killiecrankie lies at its northern end.

Killiecrankie is part of the Loch Tummel National Scenic Area, one of 40 such areas in Scotland, which are defined so as to identify areas of exceptional scenery and to ensure their protection by restricting certain forms of development.
