= Birmingham School (landscape artists) =

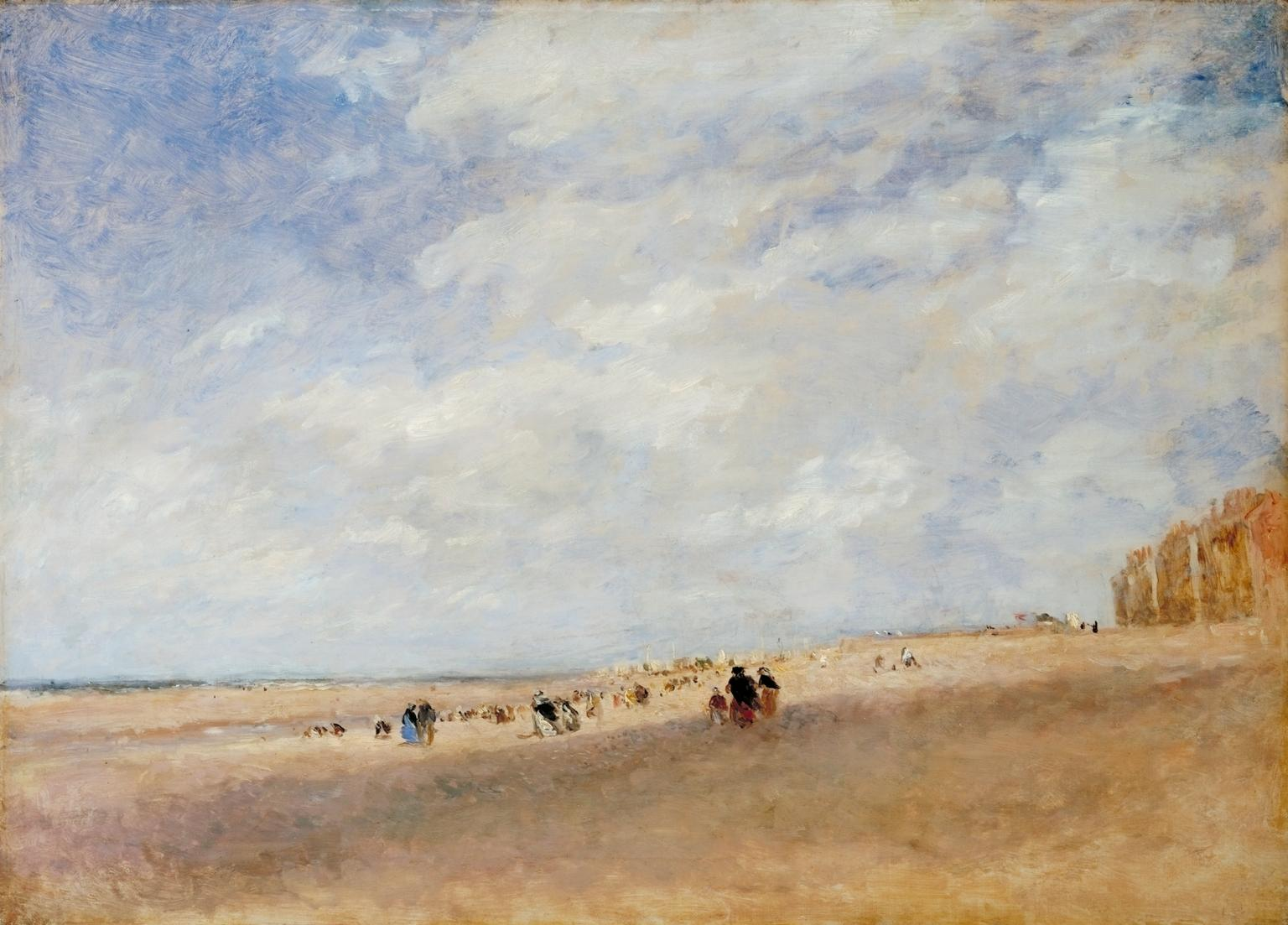
Rhyl Sands (c.1854), oil on canvas by David Cox

The Birmingham School was a group of landscape artists working in Birmingham, England in the late 18th and early 19th centuries; descending from Daniel Bond, who was active in the 1760s, and including well-known later figures such as Thomas Creswick, Thomas Baker and David Cox, who was to become an early precursor of impressionism.

Although the artists of the school were not formally organised, they were related by their common technique, which distinguished them from the broader field of contemporary landscapists. In particular the Birmingham School is notable for its emphasis on character as well as precision in its portrayal of nature; for example often depicting trees in a manner that has more in common with portraiture, and showing "a quest for the essential, the quiddity of what is observed." Many of the artists were also related by training: Bond taught in the 1760s and pupils of his exhibited at the Free Society of Artists in London in 1763; Joseph Barber opened a drawing academy in 1801 where pupils included Cox and Baker; and Samuel Lines opened another academy in 1806 where pupils included Creswick.

== Members ==
- Daniel Bond (1725–1803)
- Joseph Barber (1758–1811)
- Samuel Lines (1778–1863)
- Charles Barber (1783–1854)
- David Cox (1783–1859)
- W. Roberts (1788–1867)
- Joseph Vincent Barber (1788–1838)
- H. C. Allport (fl. 1811–23)
- Henry Harris Lines (1801–1889)
- Samuel Rostill Lines (1804–1833)
- F. H. Henshaw (1807–1891)
- Thomas Baker (1809–1864)
- Thomas Creswick (1811–1869)
- George Wallis (1811–1891)
- C. T. Burt (1823–902)
- Harry John Johnson (1826–1884)
- Elijah Walton(1832–1880)

== See also ==
- Art of Birmingham
