= Harry John Johnson =

British painter

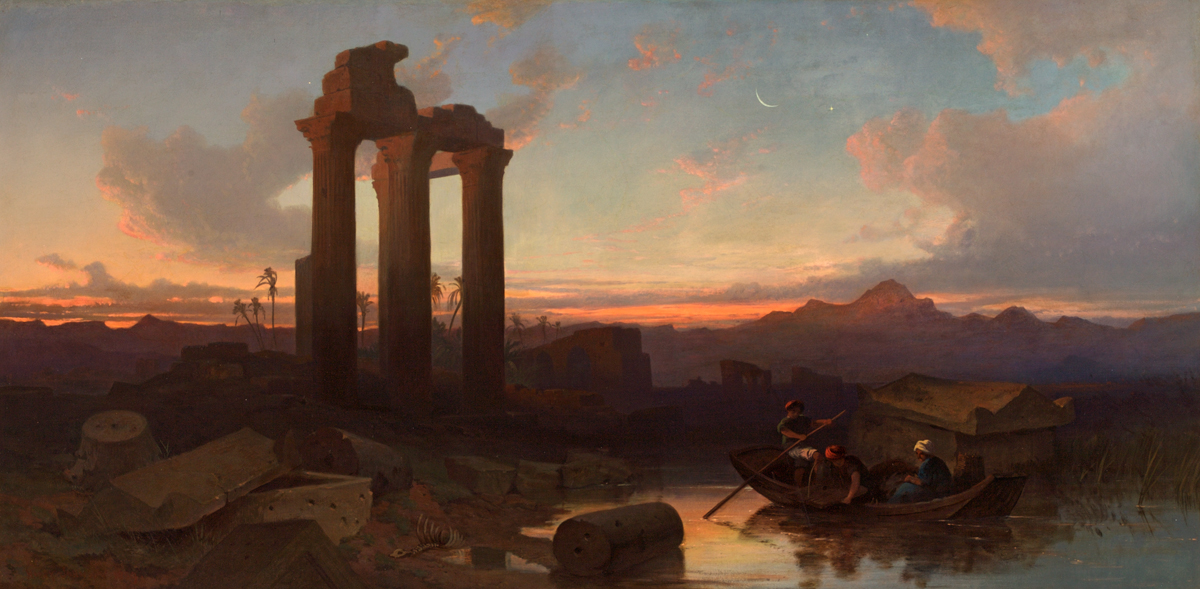
Hierapolis, oil painting by Harry John Johnson, c.1844

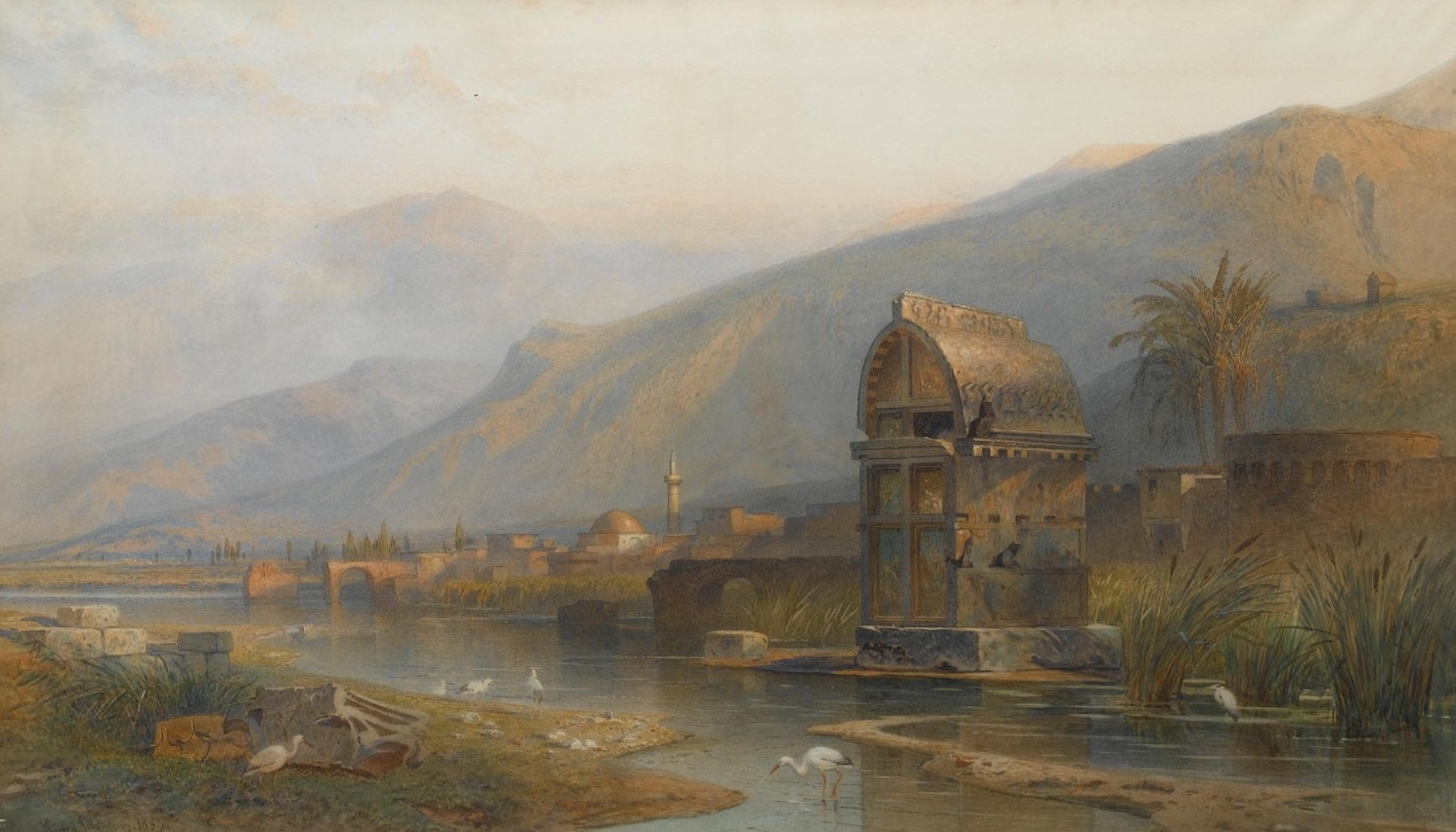
Lycian sarcophagus, c.1883.

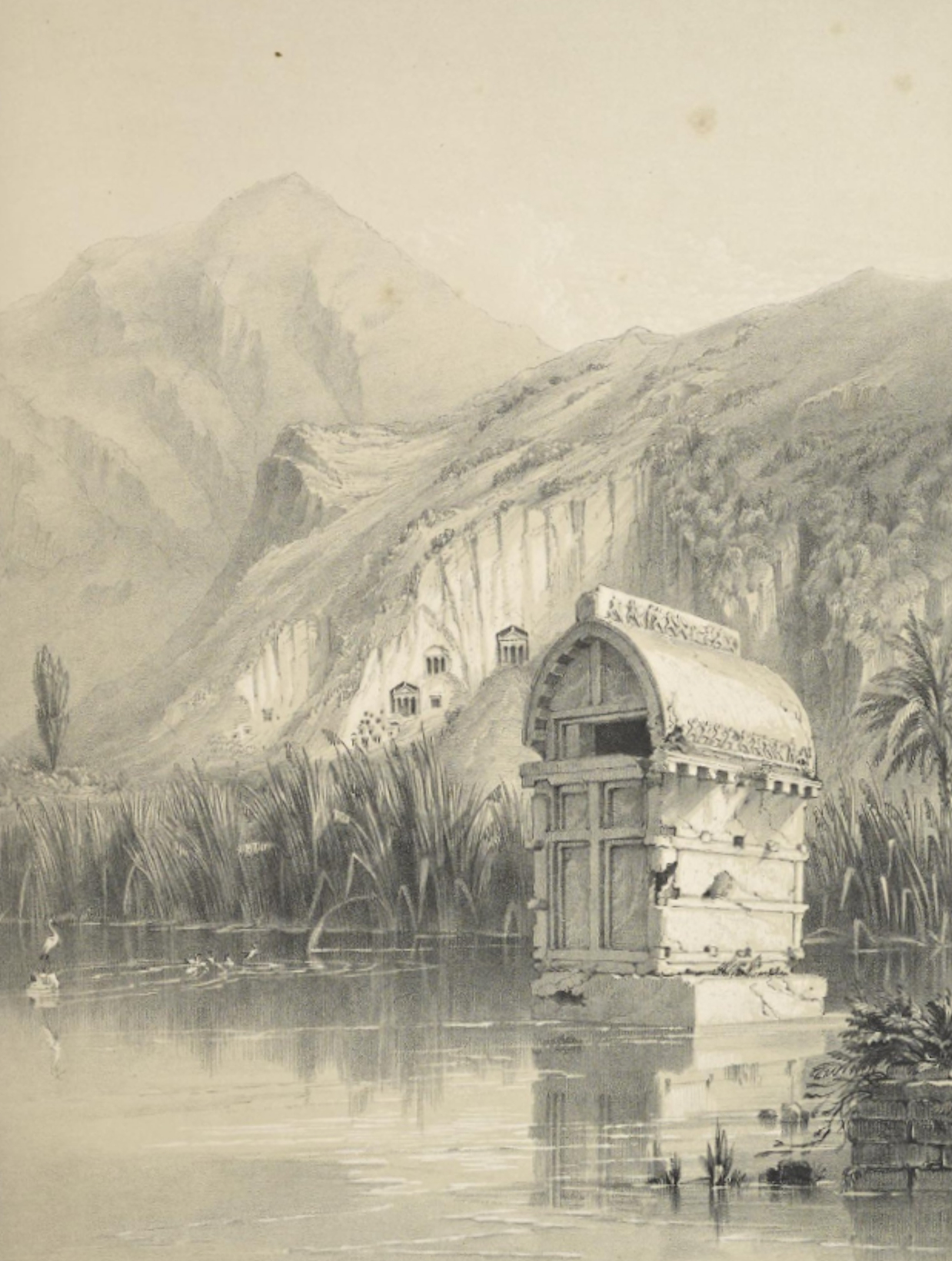
Lycian sarcophagus, c.1883.

Henry John Johnson, usually known as Harry (10 April 1826 — 31 December 1884) was an English landscape and water colour painter.

== Life ==
Johnson was born in Birmingham, where he studied under Samuel Lines. He was then in London as a studio pupil of William James Müller. With Müller he made an extended visit in 1843 to Lycia, where Charles Fellows was carrying out an excavation. The watercolours of Turkey that Müller painted during this period were an important influence on him.

Johnson travelled in southern Europe, northern Africa and Asia Minor. He painted oil - and watercolour pictures (ruins of Sardis, the Acropolis in Athens, Temple of Athena in Aegina). In 1844 he was making one of a number of visits to Betws-y-coed in Wales - this time with David Cox of the Birmingham School who was known for painting landscapes. He exhibited at the Royal Academy from 1845, and at other times in the next 35 years. Johnson has watercolours in the Victoria & Albert Museum as well as paintings in collections in Bath, Sheffield and Birmingham.

At the end of his life he was living at Loudon Street in London when he left a widow and a daughter.
