= Jennens =

Jennens is a surname. Notable people with the name include:

- Charles Jennens (1700 – 20 November 1773), English landowner and patron of the arts
- William Jennens (1701–1798), English financier
- Aaron Jennens (fl. 1815–1864), a partner in papier-mâché producers Jennens and Bettridge
- David Jennens (1929–2000), English rower
