= Capel Bond =

English organist and composer

Capel Bond (14 December 1730 – 14 February 1790) was an English organist and composer.

== Life and career ==
He was born in Gloucester, the son of William Bond and the younger brother of painter and japanner Daniel Bond (1725–1803). He received his education at the Crypt school with his uncle, Rev. Daniel Bond, and at the age of twelve became apprentice to the organist of Gloucester Cathedral, Martin Smith. He left for Coventry in 1749, where he became organist of two large churches, St Michael and All Angels (later Coventry Cathedral), and, in 1752, Holy Trinity Church, Coventry.

He married Ann Spooner, the daughter of Abraham Spooner and his second wife, Anne Birch, at Holy Trinity in 1768. Anne's cousin Sarah Sebright (6th Baroness Sebright and mother of Henrietta, 2nd Countess Harewood) said of Capel Bond "I had seen Miss Spooner’s marriage in the news and never was more surprised how careful ought people to be that have Daughters who they admit into their families. I should have thought no man less formidable than Mr. Bond."

Such was his 'superior merit and regular attendance' that he was awarded an additional £10 per annum as a 'Compliment' from 1770. He did much to encourage musical life in the Midlands, directing the Coventry Musical Society in large works such as Handel's Messiah and Samson, organising concerts and participating in festivals in Coventry and Birmingham.

He died in 1790 and is buried at St Bartholomew's Church, Binley, Coventry. His tombstone reads:

H[ic] J[acet]
CAPEL BOND
40 years organist of the Churches
of St Michael and Holy Trinity in
COVENTRY
He [wa]s an eminent musician
[and] indulgent husband
[an]d steady in his friendships
[exempl]ary in the constant practice
[of his Ch]ristian and social duties
he died 14 February 1790 / aged 59.

== Works ==
His Six Concertos in Seven Parts (London, 1766) are a collection of four concerti grossi and a concerto each for bassoon and trumpet. The collection is similar in style to works by Midlands composers Richard Mudge and John Alcock published in 1749 and 1750, though also has much in common with the concerti grossi of contemporary English composers Handel, John Stanley, Francesco Geminiani and Charles Avison's arrangements of Domenico Scarlatti. The bassoon concerto is more galant in style and may owe some influence to a lost work from 1745 by William Boyce. The compositions are considered among the best of any English provincial composer, and in their own time were occasionally heard in the Concerts of Antient Music until 1812.

His only other known compositions are Six Anthems in Score (London, 1769).

== Sources ==
- Owain Edwards/Peter Holman: 'Bond, Capel', Grove Music Online ed. L. Macy (Accessed 2007-05-24), http://www.grovemusic.com/
- David J. Golby, ‘Bond, Capel (bap. 1730, d. 1790)’, Oxford Dictionary of National Biography, Oxford University Press, 2004 (http://www.oxforddnb.com/view/article/57290, accessed 24 May 2007)
- 18th Century English Music - Capel Bond (1730–1790)
- 1768 letter from Sarah Sebright to her mother Henrietta Knight
