= William Bennett (painter) =

English painter

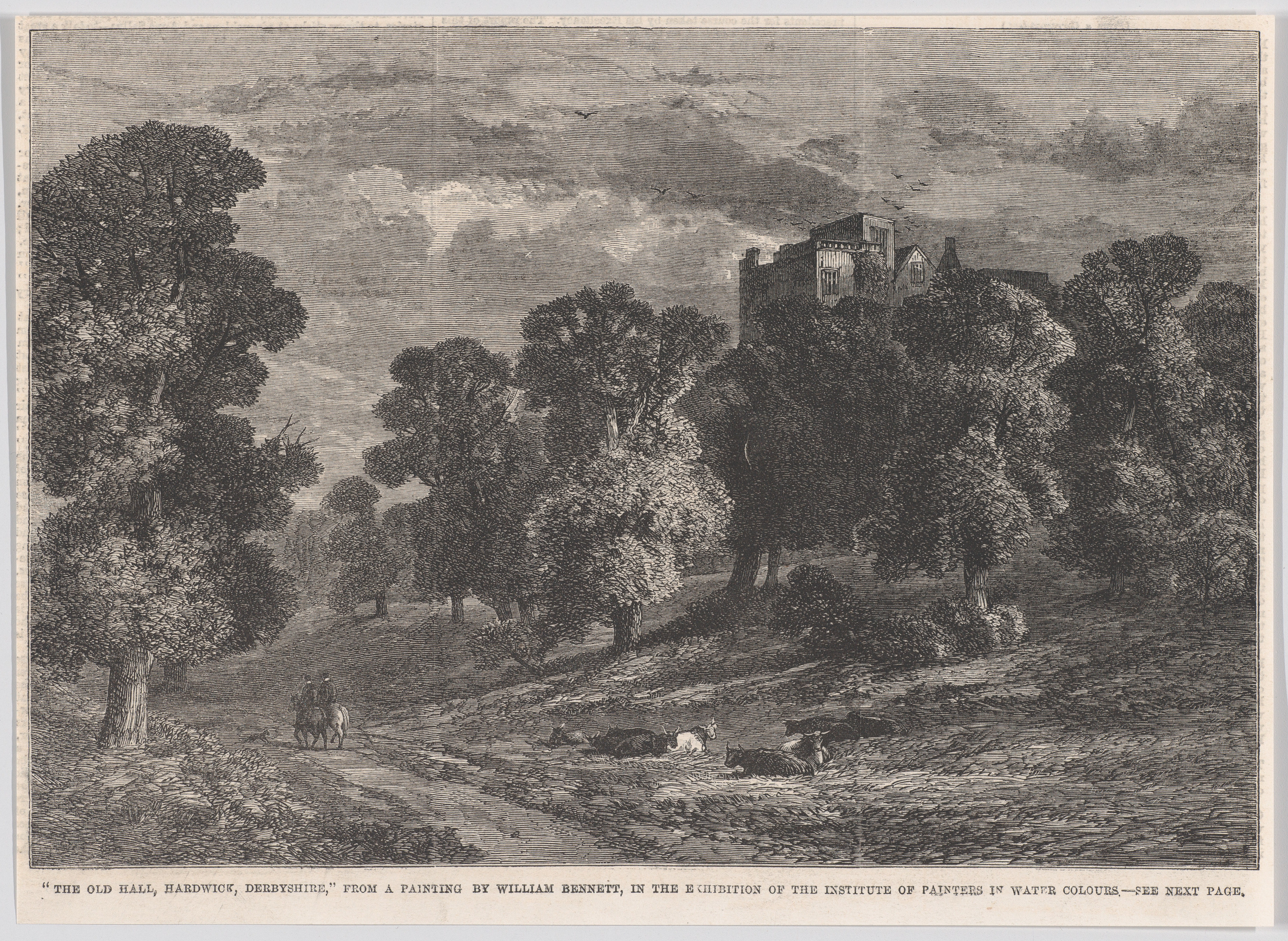
The Old Hall, Hardwick, Derbyshire, after Bennett, from the "Illustrated London News

William Bennett (1811–1871) was an English watercolour landscape painter.

It is believed that Bennett received his first lessons in art from David Cox. They went on painting trips to beauty spots in north Wales, the north of England and Scotland, with David Cox Jnr (Cox's son) and other artist friends. In 1848 he was made a member of the New Water-Colour Society, and contributed landscapes, chiefly of English scenery, to their exhibitions, until his death in 1871. He also exhibited at the Royal Academy (RA), British Institution (BI) and the Royal Society of British Artists (RBA).

Bennett learnt from Cox the ability to draw with speed, and worked with a restricted range of colours, achieving his artistic effect by "the quickest and most dexterous use of a large brush full of colour dashed with hurried certainty over the roughest paper". In this way he achieved the effect of portraying the initial impact of the scene to the artist, but at the expense of accuracy.

Bennett lived for a period at "Milford Lodge", New Park Road, in Clapham Park, London (the house has since been demolished); next door but one to David Cox Jnr and his family, who lived at 2 New Park Road from 1860. He died in 1871 and is buried at West Norwood Cemetery, London. One of Bennett's pupils was Alfred Williams (1832–1905).
