= David Cox Jr. =

English painter

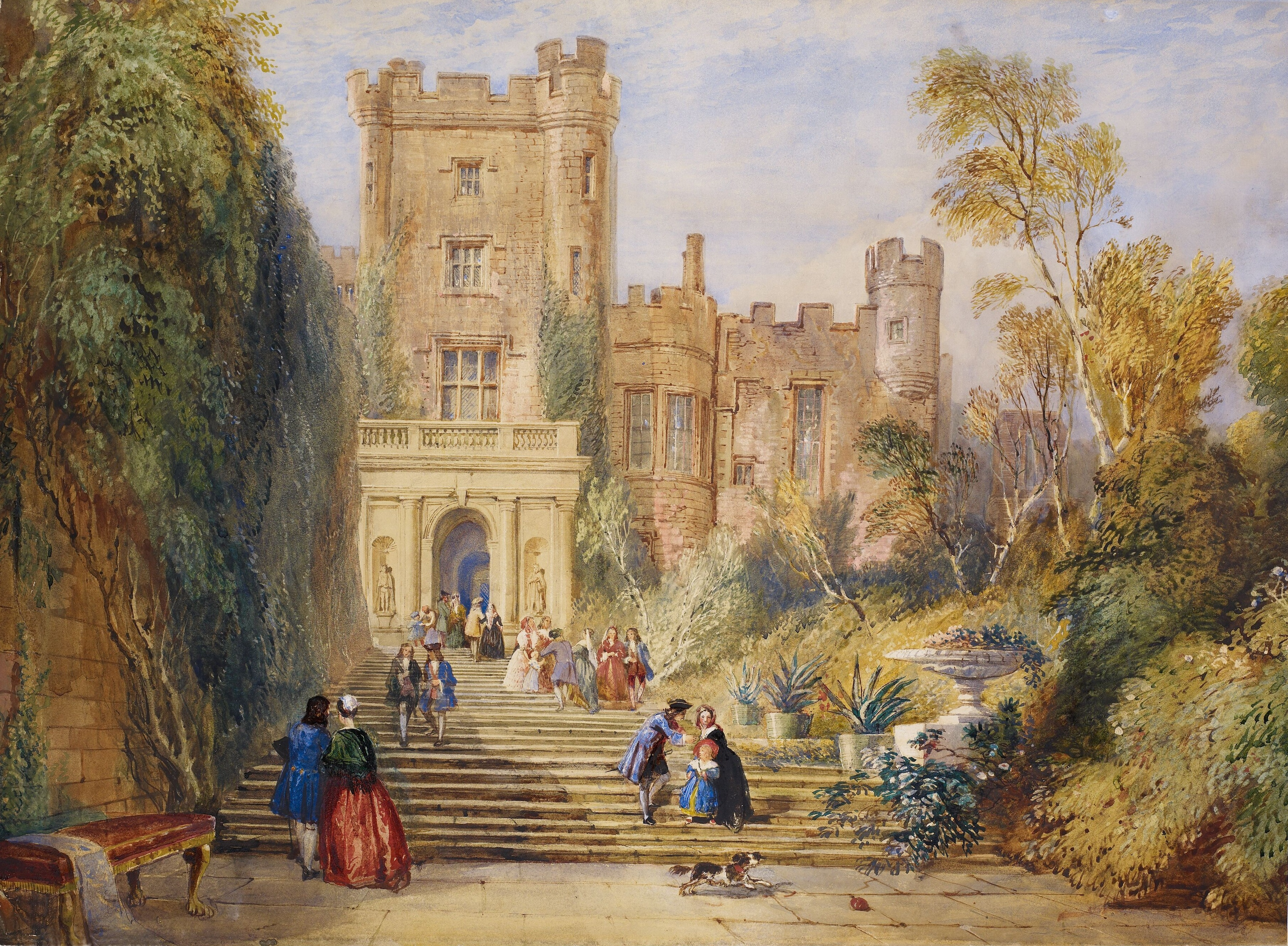
Powys Castle, watercolour, 1885

David Cox (9 July 1809 – 6 December 1885), known as David Cox the Younger, David Cox II or David Cox Jr. to distinguish him from his better-known father David Cox (1783-1859), was an English painter in watercolour, mostly of landscapes. He broadly continued his father's style, but with Late Victorian elements; even at his best he has never been seen to match his father in quality.

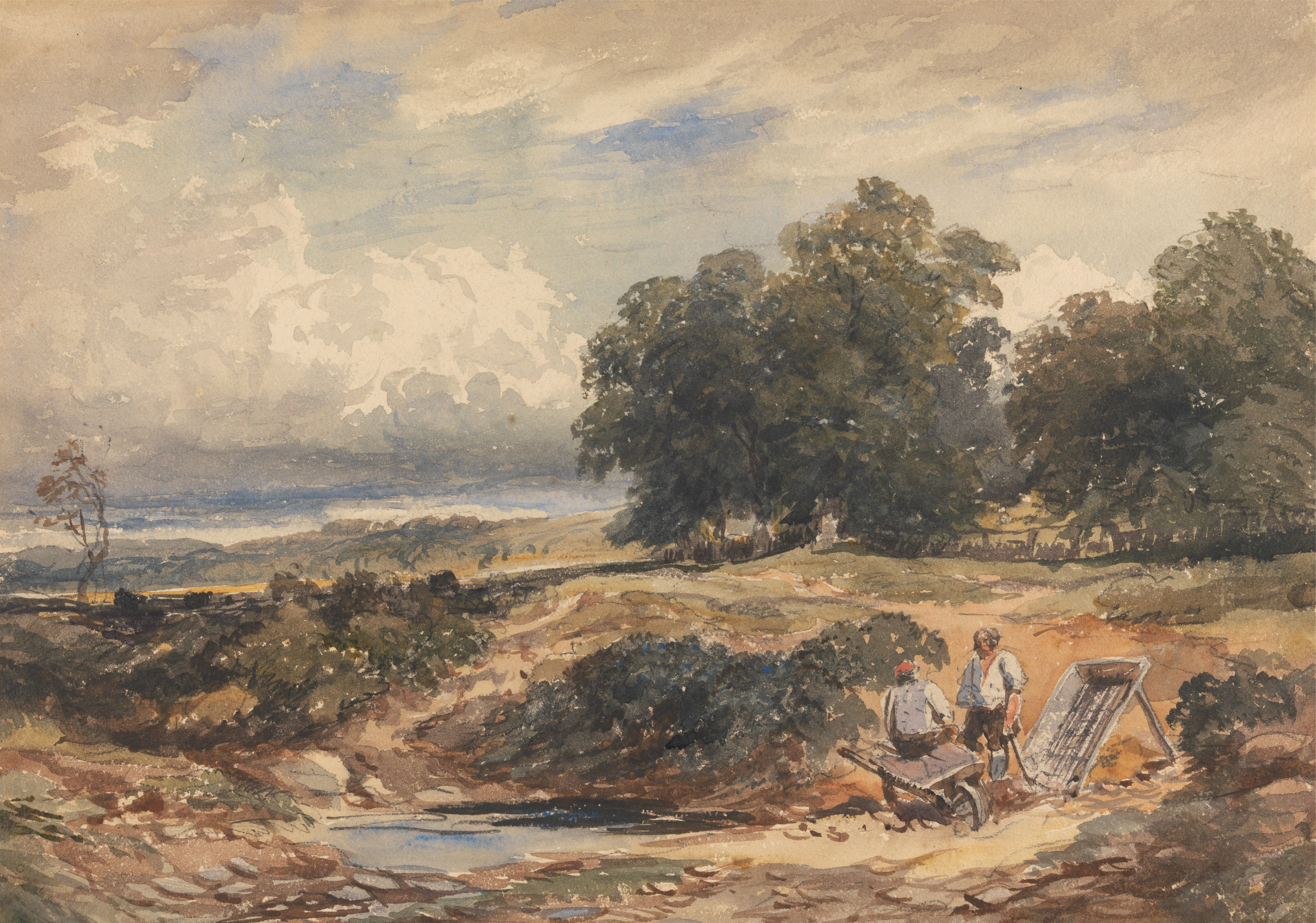
Landscape with Men Sifting Sand, 1850s

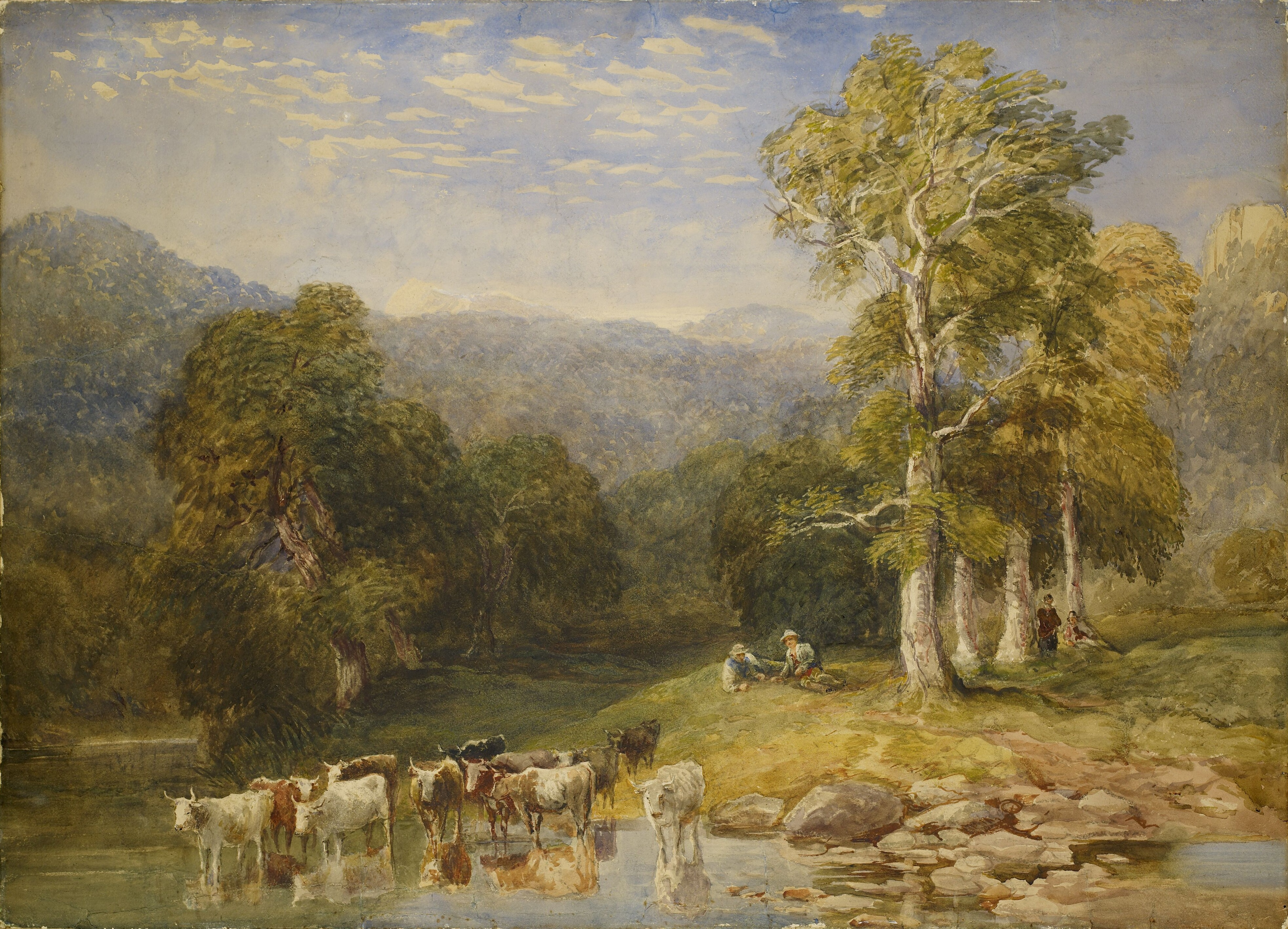
Junction of the Llugwy and Conway, North Wales

Born in Dulwich, London and educated at Hereford Grammar School, he was taught to paint and draw by his father, although he used a brighter colour palette than his father. He accompanied him on sketching tours, including one to Belgium and Holland in 1826. As well as working around London, where he made several paintings of the Norwood Gypsies and other local colour, his landscapes included Wales, Scotland, the Lake District, Devon, France, and Switzerland.

He exhibited at the Royal Academy from 1827, at the New Society of Painters in Water Colours from 1841 and the Society of Painters in Water Colours from 1848, where he would eventually exhibit 580 works. He died at his home in Streatham and was buried at West Norwood Cemetery.

His works are found in most British museums with collections of watercolours, and some American ones.
