= Scene on the Tummel, Perthshire =

Painting by Thomas Creswick

- Artist: Thomas Creswick
- Year: 1844
- Type: Oil on canvas, landscape painting
- Dimensions: 91.5 cm × 71.1 cm (36.0 in × 28.0 in)
- Location: Victoria and Albert Museum, London

Scene on the Tummel, Perthshire is an 1844 landscape painting by the British artist Thomas Creswick. It features a view of the River Tummel in Scotland, close to the town of Pitlochry in Perthshire. In the background is the Pass of Killiecrankie while the promontory known as the Giant's Steps is on the left. Creswick was a Sheffield-born artists known for his landscape paintings of British scenes. The area was popular with Victorian artists with John Everett Millais painting his The Sound of Many Waters near Dunkeld. J.M.W. Turner had already produced a landscape Tummel Bridge, Perthshire in 1802.

The painting was displayed at the Royal Academy Exhibition of 1844 at the National Gallery on Trafalgar Square. Acquired by the art collector John Sheepshanks, it was donated by him to the new Victoria and Albert Museum in South Kensington as part of the Sheepshanks Gift in 1857.

== Bibliography ==
- Fleming, Gordon H. John Everett Millais: A Biography. Constable, 1998.
- MacLeod. Anne. From an Antique Land: Visual Representations of the Highlands and Islands 1700-1880. Birlinn, 2012
- Parkinson, Ronald. Catalogue of British Oil Paintings 1820-1860. Victoria and Albert Museum, 1990.
- Roe, Sonia. Oil Paintings in Public Ownership in the Victoria and Albert Museum. Public Catalogue Foundation, 2008.
