= Joseph Murray Ince =

British painter (1806–1859)

- Born: April 1806; Marylebone London
- Died: 24 September 1859 (aged 53)
- Resting place: Kensal Green Cemetery
- Known for: painter

Joseph Murray Ince (1806–1859) was a British painter known for his landscapes, drawings, and watercolours of local scenes in Wales and paintings of Cambridge and Oxford colleges.

== Life ==
Joseph Murray Ince was born in London in April 1806 and he spent his childhood in Presteigne in Radnorshire (now in Powys), Wales. Ince was certain of his future profession and as a career choice took immediately to painting. From 1823 to 1826 he was a pupil under the painter David Cox. In 1826 he moved to London and exhibited at the Royal Academy. Later his work was chosen for exhibition at the British Institution for Promoting the Fine Arts in the United Kingdom and other galleries.

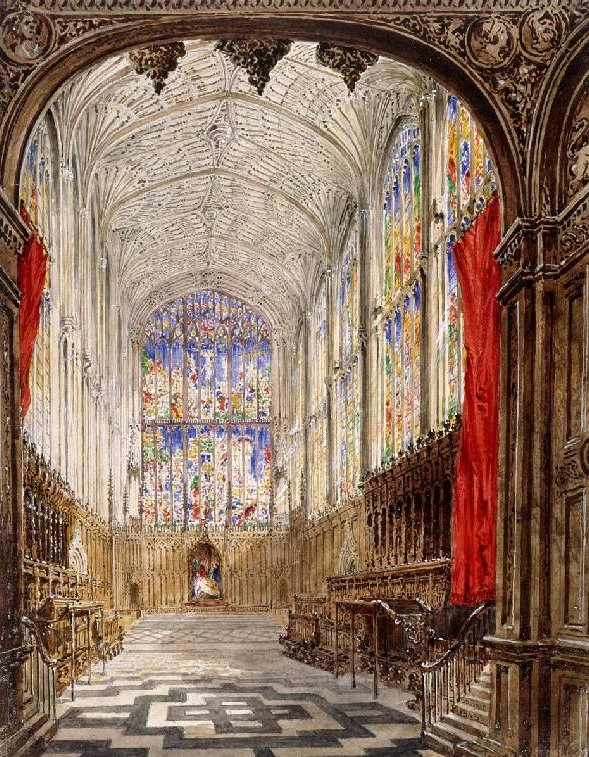
Kings College Cambridge by Ince

In 1832 he made many architectural drawings and views of the colleges in Oxford and Cambridge. Ince was a drawing master at Cambridge University in the 1830s living at 12 King's Parade. Ince married in 1834 but lost his wife in childbirth. About 1835 he returned to Presteigne, where he spent the majority of his time, but he had to keep contact with his customers as well in London. He had inherited some property from his parents which supplemented the good income that he made from his painting. He painted many maritime and rural scenes including harvesting and woodcutting showing contemporary people and their animals.

Ince died on 24 September 1859, and was buried in Kensal Green cemetery, London. Ince was a good painter of landscapes in watercolour. There are examples of his drawings at the South Kensington Museum, and in the print room at the British Museum.

He has a blue plaque on his former house in Powys and a monument was erected to his memory at Presteigne.
