= David Hall McKewan =

English watercolour painter

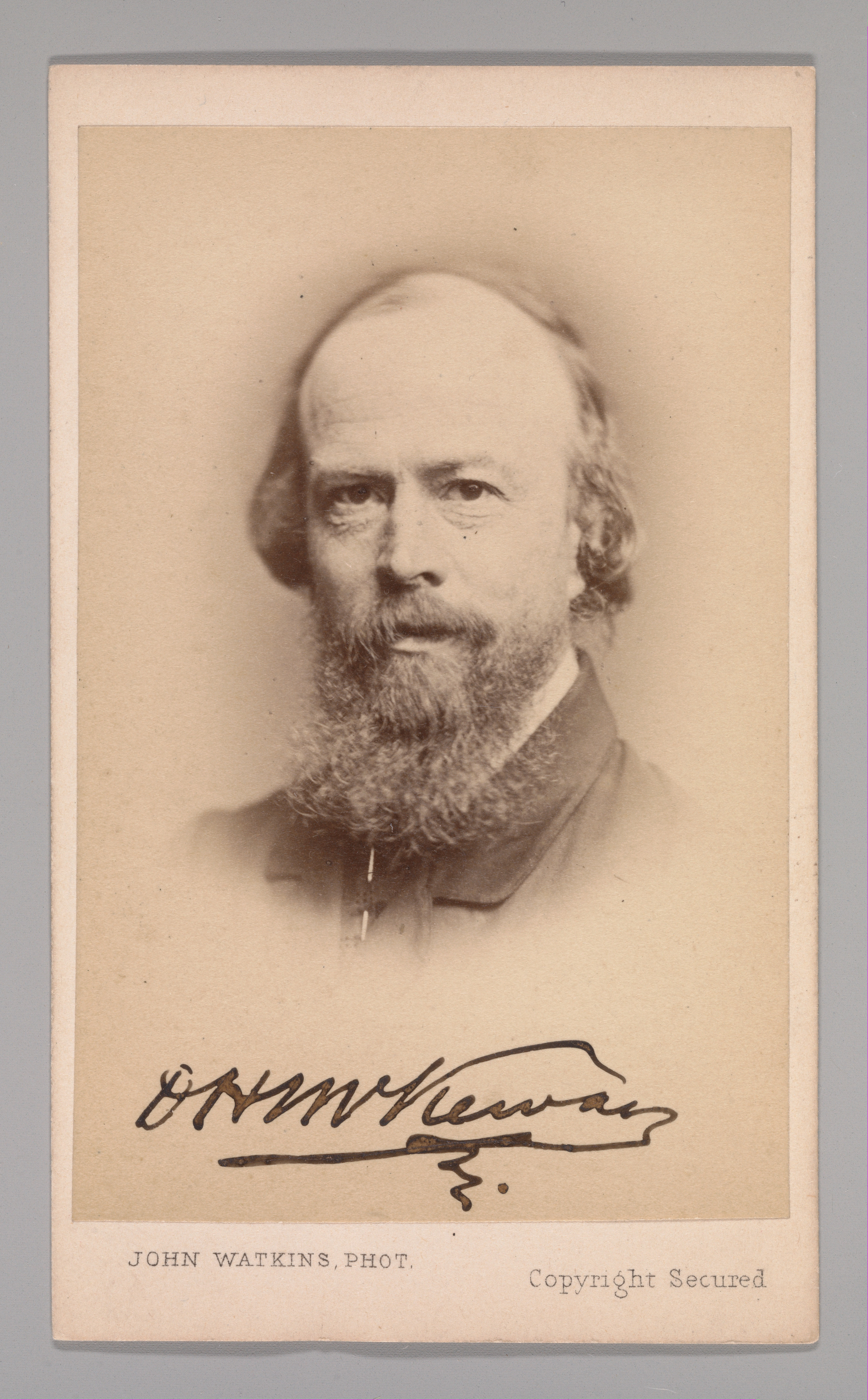
D. H. McKewan (1860s)

David Hall McKewan, RI (1816 – 1873) was an English water-colour painter.

== Life ==
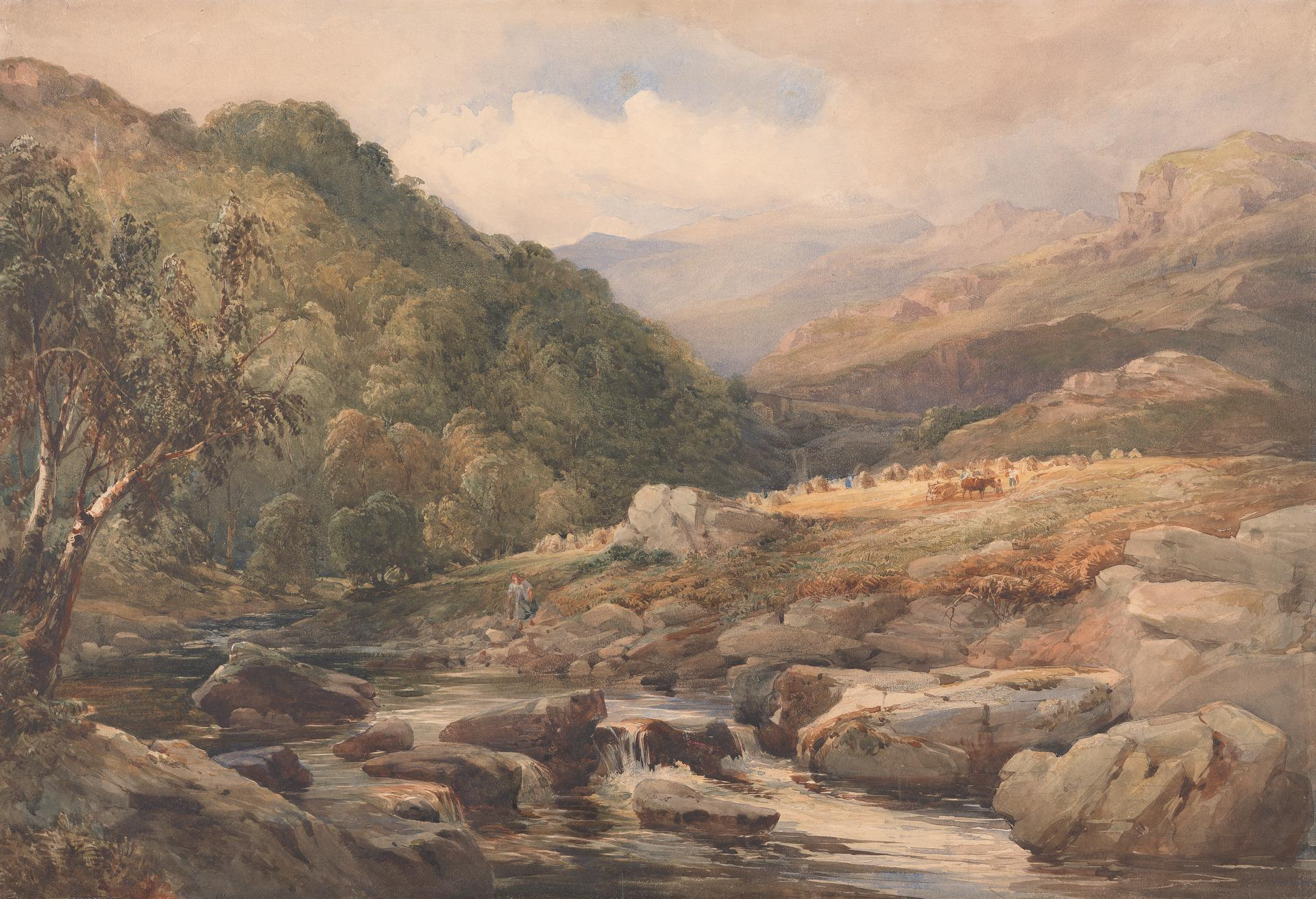
Landscape with Stream and Haymakers (undated)

David Hall McKewan, born in London on 16 February 1816, was son of David McKewan, manager to Messrs. Hall of Custom-House Quay, Lower Thames Street, London, and Matilda, his wife. He studied water-colour painting under David Cox the Elder, and exhibited at the Royal Academy in 1836.

McKewan obtained some note as a water-colour painter, especially in drawing rocky scenes and the interiors of old mansions, such as Knole, Haddon Hall, and others. He was elected an associate of the Royal Institute of Painters in Water-colours in 1848, and a full member in 1850; he was a large contributor to the exhibitions of that society.

McKewan died on 2 August 1873. He published in 1869 Lessons on Trees in Water Colours, and made the drawings for R. P. Leitch's Landscape and other Studies in Sepia, published in 1870.

== Bibliography ==
- Baker, Anne Pimlott (2004). "McKewan, David Hall (1816–1873), watercolour painter". In Oxford Dictionary of National Biography. Oxford University Press.
- Cust, Lionel Henry (1893). "McKewan, David Hall" . In Lee, Sidney (ed.). Dictionary of National Biography. Vol. 35. London: Smith, Elder & Co. pp. 168–169.
- Oliver, Valerie Cassel, ed. (2011). "Mckewan, David Hall". In Benezit Dictionary of Artists. Oxford University Press.
