= Daniel Bond =

English painter

John Daniel Bond (1725 – 18 December 1803) was an English painter. One of the earliest figures in the history of art in Birmingham, he was the first of the Birmingham School of landscape artists.

== Life and career ==
Bond was baptised in Stroud, Gloucestershire in July 1725 and probably educated at The Crypt School in Gloucester, where his uncle was an usher. He married Susannah Hodgetts at St Philip's, Birmingham in 1758. He was apprenticed as a painter of japanned and papier-mâché goods to Henry Clay in Birmingham, and from 1757 was in charge of the ornamental department of Matthew Boulton's Soho Manufactory.

Nothing is known of Bond's artistic career until 1761, when he exhibited a landscape drawing after Claude Joseph Vernet at the Society of Artists in London. Between 1762 and 1769 he exhibited over 30 landscapes at the rooms of the Free Society of Artists, exhibiting further works in 1775 and 1780. He won 25 guineas in 1764 for the second best landscape in the exhibition, and in 1765 he won 50 guineas for the first prize.

His productions are described as highly finished landscapes, broad in treatment, after the style of Wilson, R.A.. He seems to have amassed property enough to live a retired life during his latter years. He died at Hagley Row, Edgbaston, Birmingham, on 18 December 1803. In 1804, a few months after his death, a number of his pictures and drawings were sold by auction in London.

He was the elder brother of the composer Capel Bond.
