= Rhyl Sands =

Painting by David Cox

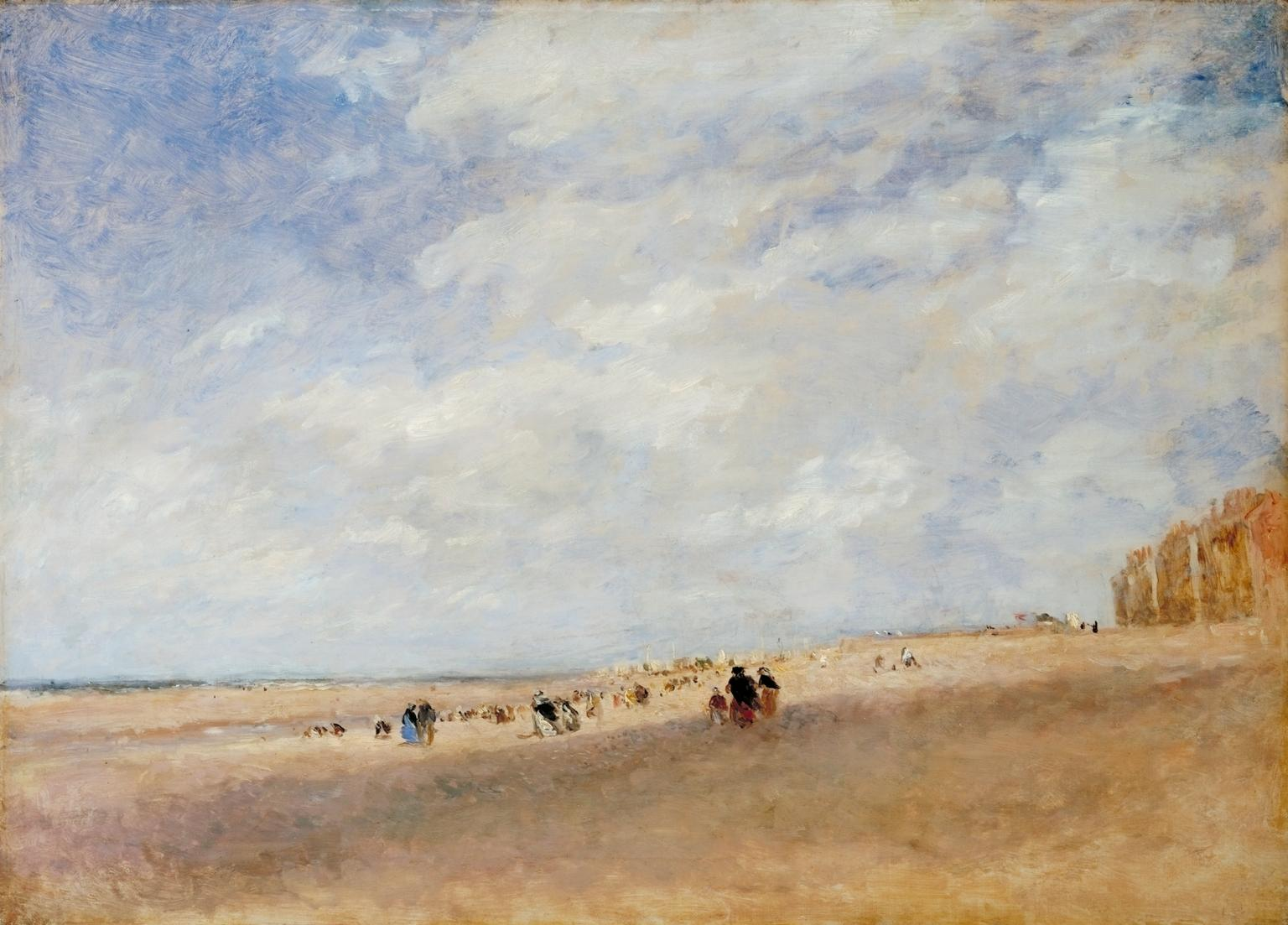
- Artist: David Cox
- Year: 1854
- Type: Oil on canvas, landscape painting
- Dimensions: 63. cm × 45.4 cm (25 in × 17.9 in)
- Location: Tate Britain; London

Rhyl Sands is an 1854 landscape painting by the British artist David Cox. It depicts a view of the beach at Rhyl in North Wales.

A member of the Birmingham School, Cox was best known for his watercolours and took up oil painting in later years. His style was influenced by the success of J.M.W. Turner and has also been considered a forerunner of Impressionism. He has been visiting the area since 1841. The work as produced towards the end of his career, at the age of seventy one. Today the painting is in the collection of Tate Britain in Pimlico, having been acquired in 1985. Another view of Rhyl from roughly the same period is now in the Manchester Art Gallery.

== Bibliography ==
- Wilcox, Scott & Bower, Peter. Sun, Wind, and Rain: The Art of David Cox. Yale Centre for British Art, 2008.
