= Henry Clay (papier-mâché maker) =

English industrial pioneer (died 1812)

- Born: 1720s
- Died: 1812
- Occupations: Businessperson, inventor

Henry Clay (fl. 1740–, died 1812) was an English inventor, active in Birmingham and later London, and pioneer of japanning and papier-mâché making, who patented a laminate sheet process for the latter's production.

He also served as High Sheriff of Warwickshire.

== Career ==
Clay was apprenticed at John Baskerville's japanning works in Moor Street, Birmingham, from 1740–49, and subsequently worked as a printer

He took out a patent dated 20 November 1772 for a method of making a "new improved paper-ware", by pasting sheets of paper together in moulds or over metal formers, then oiling and varnishing them, to produce a smooth, black surface. The resultant material was hardened by baking in stoves, and was capable of being "sawn, planed, dove-tailed or mitred in the same manner as if made in wood". It was used in sedan chairs, coaches, and carriages, furniture, and smaller items such as trays, storage containers and even buttons. These objects were japanned and painted, and sometimes decorated with jasperware reliefs supplied by Wedgwood. Among the artists known to have worked for Clay are Edward Bird (apprenticed from the age of 13), Daniel Bond (also as an apprentice), Samuel Lines, and Moses Haughton the Elder.

Clay's factory at 19, New Hall Street, Birmingham, became famous and attracted notable visitors, including the then prime-minister, Frederick North, General John Burgoyne, Lord Nelson and Prince William of Gloucester. At its peak, he employed over 300 people there.

Maker's mark on a papier-mâché tray, showing Clay's London address. The tray is now in the Metropolitan Museum of Art.

Clay's entry in Bisset's Magnificent Guide or Grand Copper Plate Directory for the Town of Birmingham (1808 edition). Note the unusual design of canal lock in the lower image.

From about 1785, Clay had trading premises at 18, King Street, Covent Garden, London. He became a supplier to George III and George IV (then Prince of Wales). On 27 May 1793, he visited the Queen's Palace to demonstrate his wares to "their Majesties and the Princesses" and presented a sedan chair and a table, made using his papier-mâché, as gifts to Queen Charlotte.

Clay's patent expired in 1802, after which a number of other firms began to market similar wares.

His other inventions included an improved type of wagon, opening in the middle, and a canal lock intended to use half the amount of water than existing designs. A modern pair of locks working on this principle, using half the water from the draining chamber to fill the other chamber, opened on the Dortmund–Ems Canal near Münster, Germany.

== Personal life and death ==
Clay was active in the civil life of Birmingham and served there as High Bailiff, as well as in the role of High Sheriff of Warwickshire in 1790–91. He was said to have "amassed a princely fortune".

His death was reported in Aris's Gazette on 4 May 1812.

== Legacy ==
In 1816, a rival papier-mâché manufacturing company, Jennens and Bettridge, acquired the Birmingham factory.

The Clay business continued, latterly as W. Clay & Sons, with a factory in Fenchurch Street, London, and salesroom in Haymarket. Henry Clay & Co., of King Street, Covent Garden, exhibited papier-mâché goods at the Great Exhibition of 1851.

The author Elihu Burritt, writing in 1868, referred to papier-mâché ware made using Clay's process as "the distinguishing speciality of the town [of Birmingham]".

Clay's products are in a number of significant museums, including the Victoria and Albert Museum, Metropolitan Museum of Art in New York, the Australian Maritime Museum, and Birmingham Museum and Art Gallery. Other extant examples include decoration on doors in Kedleston Hall and door panels at Chatsworth House, and a tray in the British Royal Collection. The British Museum hold related ephemera. Pieces by Clay have been sold at auction, for example by Christie's, and Bonhams.
