= Elijah Walton =

English painter

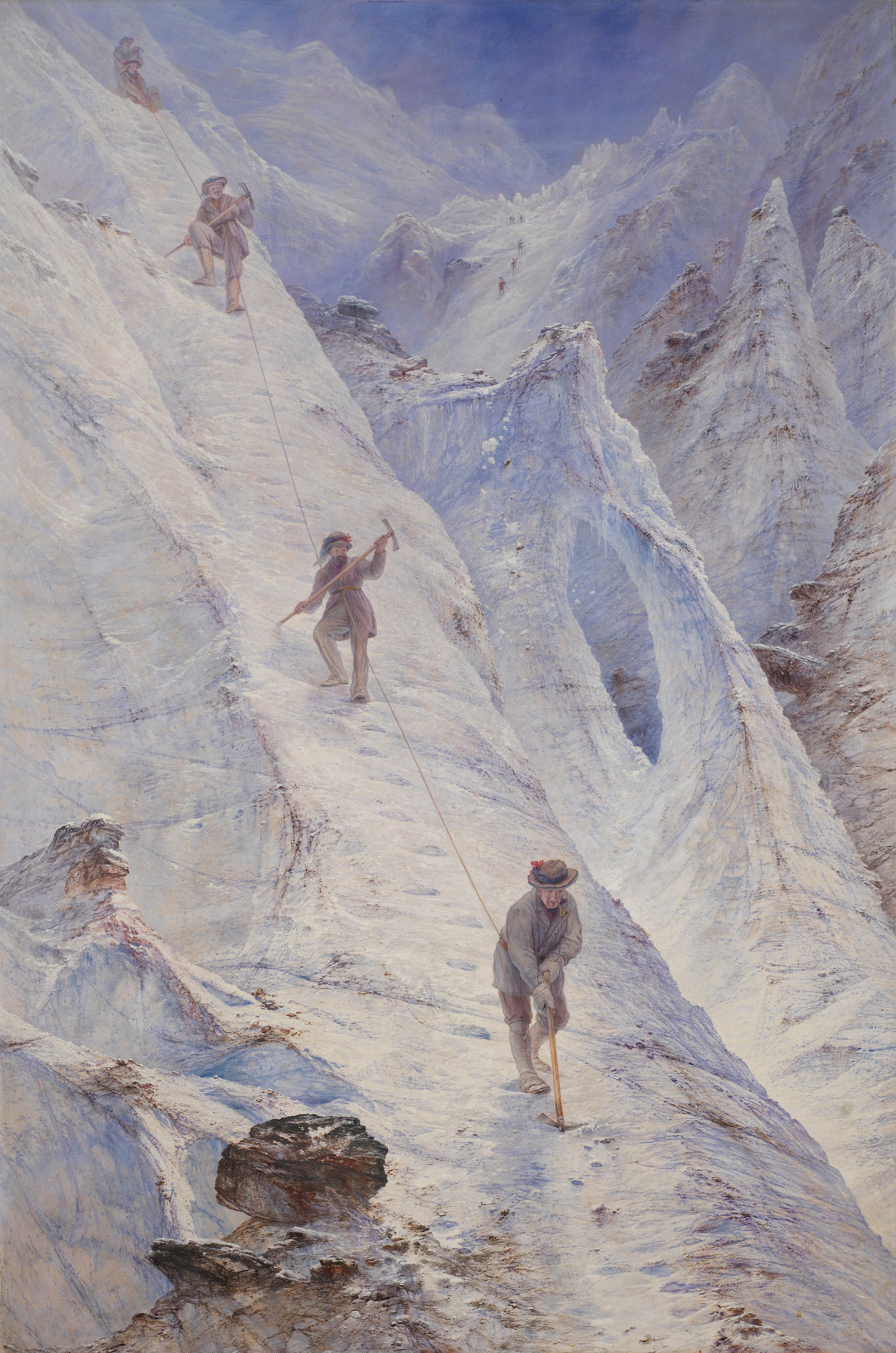
Alpine Climbers by Elijah Walton (1869; Birmingham Museum and Art Gallery)

Elijah Walton (November 1832 – 25 August 1880) was a British landscape painter, and best known for his landscapes of mountains in the Alps.

== Biography ==
He was born in November 1832 in Birmingham, where his earlier years were spent. Due to the poorness of his family, without the help of one or two friends he would have been unable to study art, for which his talent was soon exhibited. After passing some years at the art academy in Birmingham, he became at the age of eighteen a student at the Royal Academy Schools in London, where he had already exhibited a picture. There he worked assiduously, drawing from the antique and from life. Nearly ten years later an accidental circumstance revealed to a friend his capabilities in mountain landscape, and in 1860, immediately after his marriage, he went to Switzerland. Thence he proceeded to Egypt, where unhappily his wife died of dysentery near the second cataract. He remained in the east, spending some time in Syria and at Constantinople, till the spring of 1862, when he returned for a short time to London. But for the next five years he was much abroad, working either in the Alps or in Egypt.

In 1867 he married his second wife, Fanny Phipson of Birmingham. His sketching tours then became rarer and shorter, though he visited Greece, Norway, and the Alps. At first he resided at Staines, then removed to the neighbourhood of Bromsgrove, living most of the time at the Forelands, near that town. In 1872 his wife died, and the loss permanently affected his health. He died on 25 August 1880 at his residence Beacon Farm, Lickey near Bromsgrove in Worcestershire, leaving three sons.

Walton's life was bound up in his art. He worked both in oils and in watercolours, but was more successful with the latter. Most thorough and conscientious in the study both of form and of colour, he delighted especially in mountain scenery and in atmospheric effects, such as an Alpine peak breaking through the mists, or a sunset on the Nile. Few men have equalled him in the truthful rendering of rock structure and mountain form. His pictures were much appreciated by lovers of nature; but as those of small size sold better than larger and more highly finished works, this fostered a tendency to mannerisms.

== Selected works ==
Oil paintings by Walton are held by the Birmingham Museum and Art Gallery, Art Gallery of Ballarat, Victoria, Australia and Fitzwilliam Museum, Cambridge. Many of his watercolours are in private hands but some are in the British Museum and Birmingham.

=== Paintings ===
- The Peaks and Valleys of the Alps (1867)
- Flowers from the Upper Alps (1869)
- The Coast of Norway (1871)
- Vignettes, Alpine and Eastern (1873)
- The Bernese Oberland (1874)
- Welsh Scenery (1875)
- English Lake Scenery (1876)
- In the Woods or Into the Woods - Ballarat Art Gallery (inv. 1886.6) - undated.

=== Illustrated works ===
Walton was the author of the following illustrated works:

- The Camel: its Anatomy, Proportions, and Paces (1865)
- Clouds and their Combinations (1869)
- Peaks in Pen and Pencil (1872)

== Notes ==
Attribution

This article incorporates text from a publication now in the public domain: Lee, Sidney, ed. (1899). "Walton, Elijah". Dictionary of National Biography. Vol. 59. London: Smith, Elder & Co.
