= Jennens and Bettridge =

Jennens and Bettridge was a manufacturing company highly regarded for producing quality papier-mâché wares in Birmingham, West Midlands, England. It was a partnership between Theodore Hyla Jennens, John Bettridge Sr., Aaron Jennens and John Bettridge Jr. and later only A. Jennens and J. Bettridge Jr. (fl. 1815–1864). They acquired the workshops of Henry Clay, Japanner to George III and the Prince of Wales, in 1816. Their original premises were in Birmingham and they started a London branch at 3 West Halkin Street, Belgravia in 1837. Later offices were established in Paris and New York.
