= Thomas Creswick =

English painter

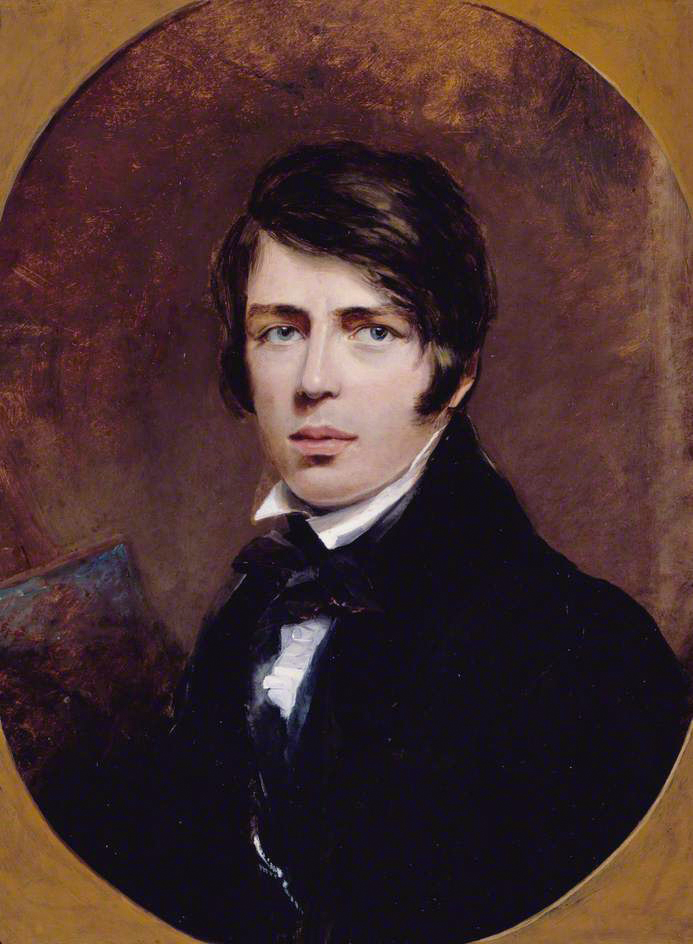
- Born: 5 February 1811; Sheffield
- Died: 28 December 1869 (aged 58)
- Style: landscape painting
- Movement: Birmingham School

Thomas Creswick RA (5 February 1811 – 28 December 1869) was a British landscapist and illustrator, and one of the best-known members of the Birmingham School of landscapists.

== Biography ==
Creswick was born in Sheffield (at the time it was within Derbyshire). He was the son of Thomas Creswick and Mary Epworth and educated at Hazelwood, near Birmingham.

According to the Encyclopædia Britannica Eleventh Edition (1911):

At Birmingham he first began to paint. His earliest appearance as an exhibitor was in 1827, at the Society of British Artists in London; in the ensuing year he sent to the Royal Academy the two pictures named Llyn Gwynant, Morning, and Carnarvon Castle. About the same time he settled in London; and in 1836 he took a house in Bayswater. He soon attracted some attention as a landscape painter, and had a career of uniform and encouraging, though not signal success. In 1842 he was elected an associate, and in 1850 a full member of the Royal Academy, which, for several years before his death, numbered hardly any other full members representing this branch of art.

In his early practice he set an example, then too much needed, of diligent study of nature out of doors, painting on the spot all the substantial part of several of his pictures. English and Welsh streams may be said to have formed his favourite subjects, and generally British rural scenery, mostly under its cheerful, calm and pleasurable aspects, in open daylight. This he rendered with elegant and equable skill, color rather grey in tint, especially in his later years, and more than average technical accomplishment; his works have little to excite, but would, in most conditions of public taste, retain their power to attract.

Creswick was industrious and extremely prolific; he produced, besides a steady outpouring of paintings, numerous illustrations for books. He was personally genial, a dark, bulky man, somewhat heavy and graceless in aspect in his later years. He died at his house in Bayswater, Linden Grove, after a few years of declining health. Among his principal works may be named England (1847); Home by the Sands, and a Squally Day (1848); Passing Showers (1849); The Wind on Shore, a First Glimpse of the Sea, and Old Trees (1850); A Mountain Lake, Moonrise (1852); Changeable Weather (1865); also the London Road, a Hundred Years ago; The Weald of Kent; the Valley Mill (a Cornish subject); a Shady Glen; the Windings of a River; the Shade of the Beech Trees; the Course of the Greta; the Wharfe; Glendalough, and other Irish subjects, 1836 to 1840; the Forest Farm Frith for figures, and Ansdell for animals, occasionally worked in collaboration with Creswick.

== Works ==
Creswick has paintings in numerous British collections and in the Yale Centre for British Art.

=== Gallery ===
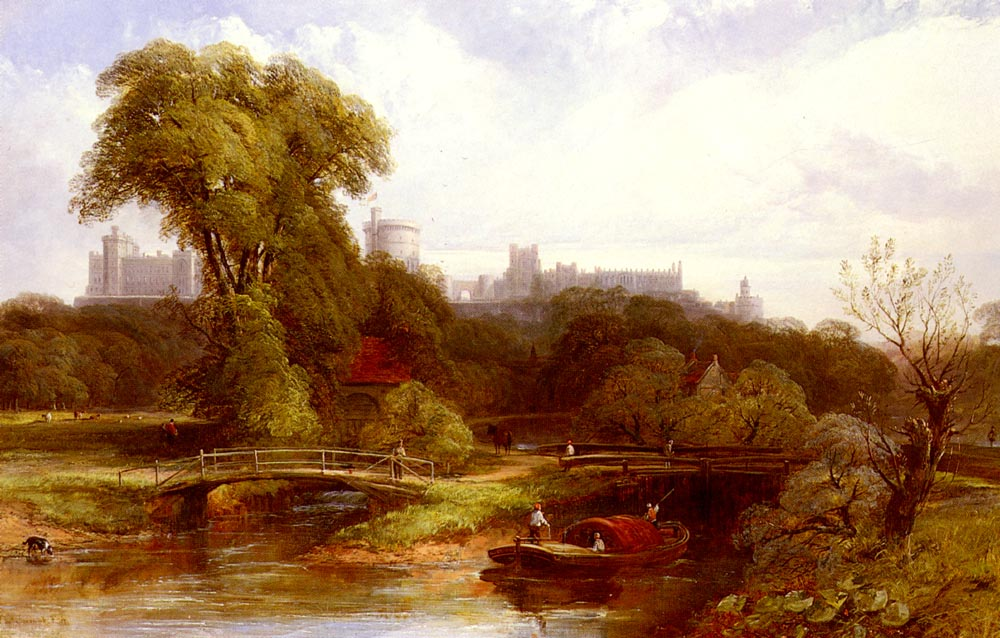
A View Of Windsor Castle

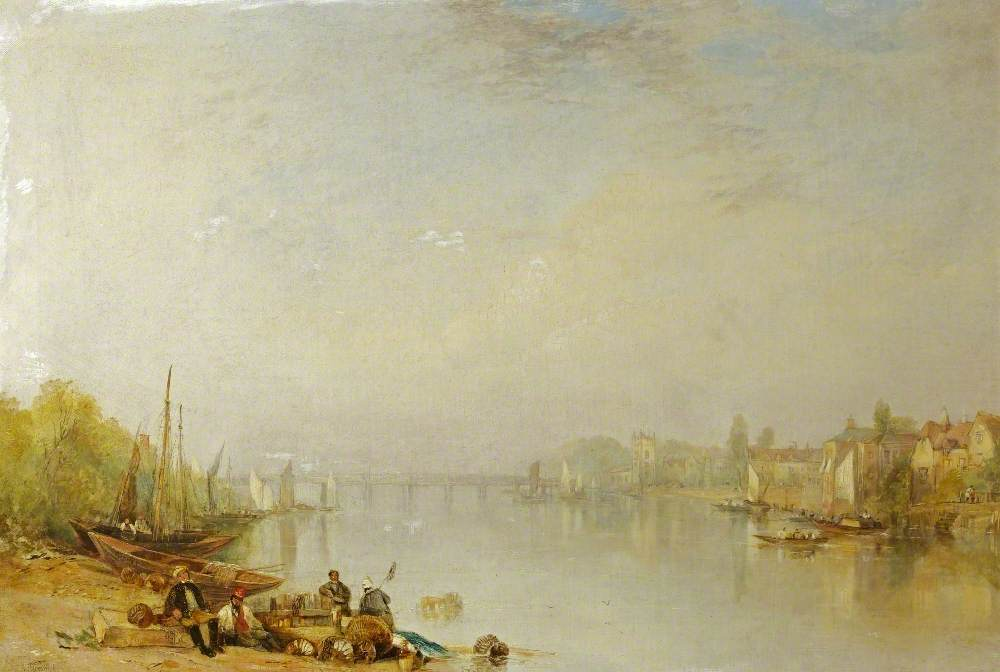
View of Putney Bridge, 1831

Scene on the Tummel, Perthshire, 1844

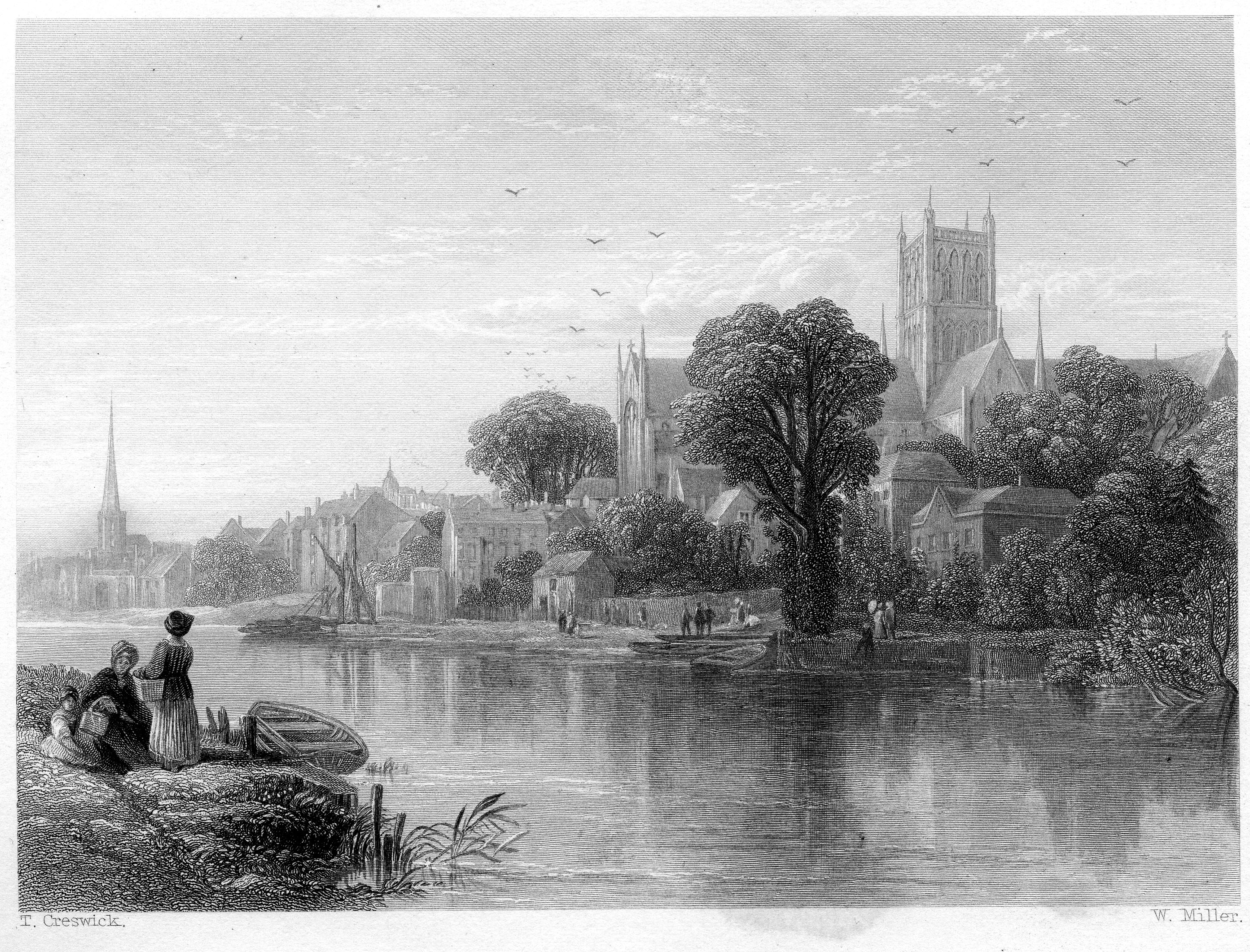
Worcester engraving by William Miller after Creswick
