= Armfield =

Armfield is an English surname. Notable people with the surname include:

- Billy Armfield (1904–1985), British athlete
- Constance Armfield (née Smedley; 1876–1941), British artist and playwright
- Dennis Armfield (born 1986), Australian footballer
- Diana Armfield (born 1920), British artist
- Jasmine Armfield (born 1998), English actress
- Jimmy Armfield (1935–2018), English football player and manager
- John Armfield (1797–1871), American slave trader
- Lillian May Armfield (1884–1971), Australian police detective
- Maxwell Armfield (1881–1972), English artist, writer, and illustrator
- Neil Armfield (born c. 1958), Australian director of theatre, film and opera
- Robert Franklin Armfield (1829–1898), American politician from North Carolina
- Thomas Armfield (1851–1931), Australian politician
- William Johnston Armfield (1934–2016), American businessman and philanthropist
