= Louis Davies =

Louis Davies may refer to:

- Sir Louis Henry Davies (1845–1924), Canadian businessman, politician, lawyer, and judge
- Louis Walter Davies (1923–2001), Australian radiophysicist

== See also ==
- Louis Davis (disambiguation)
