= Georgie Gaskin =

English designer (1866–1934)

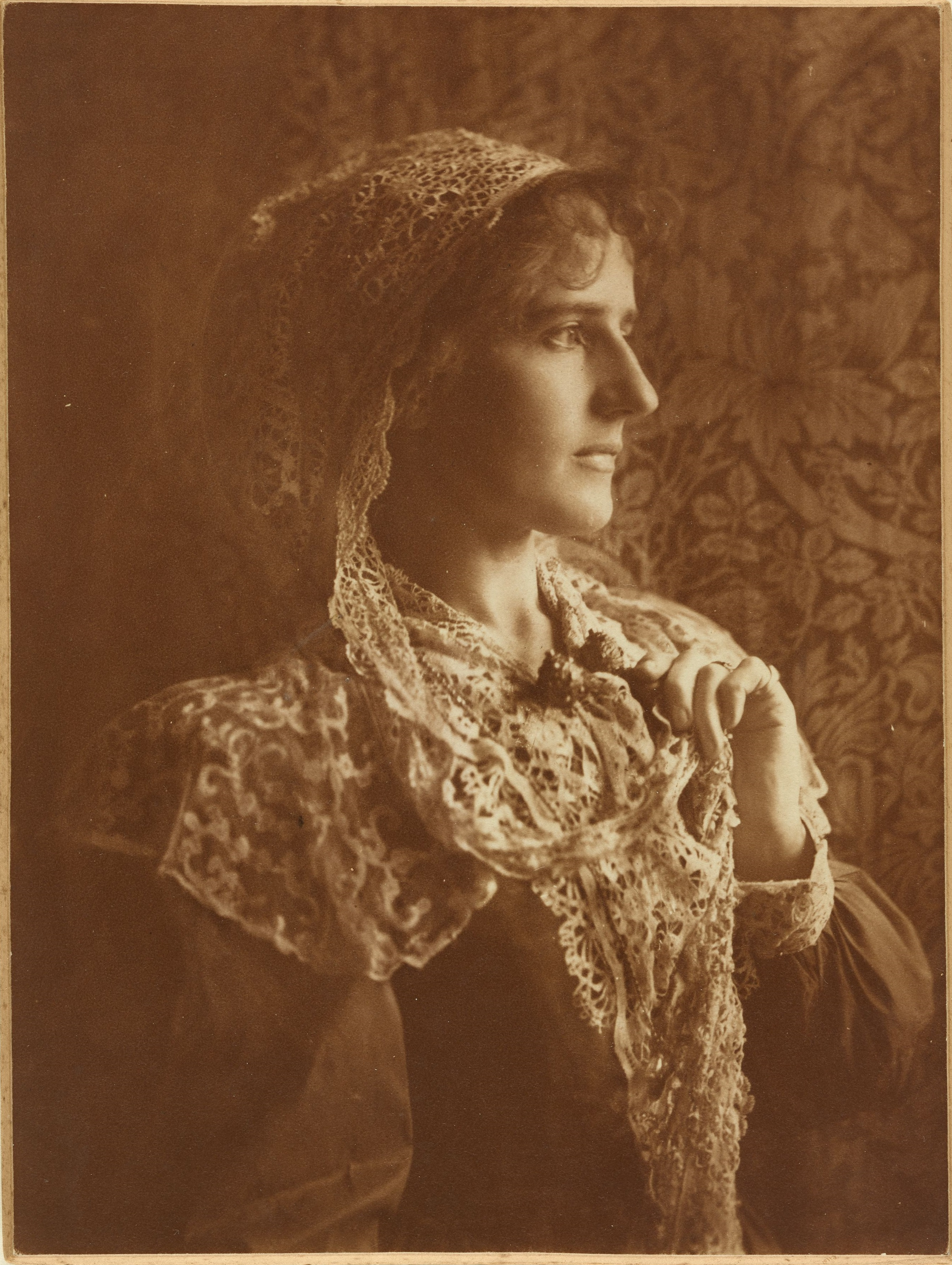
- Portrait of Gaskin by William Smedley-Aston
- Born: Georgina Evelyn Cave France; 8 December 1866; Shrewsbury, Shropshire, England
- Died: 29 October 1934 (aged 67); West Malling, Kent, England
- Education: Birmingham School of Art
- Occupation: Designer
- Spouse: Arthur Gaskin (m. 1894; died 1928)
- Children: 2

Georgina Evelyn Cave Gaskin (née France) (8 December 1866 – 29 October 1934), known as Georgie Gaskin, was an English jewellery and metalwork designer, as well as an illustrator.

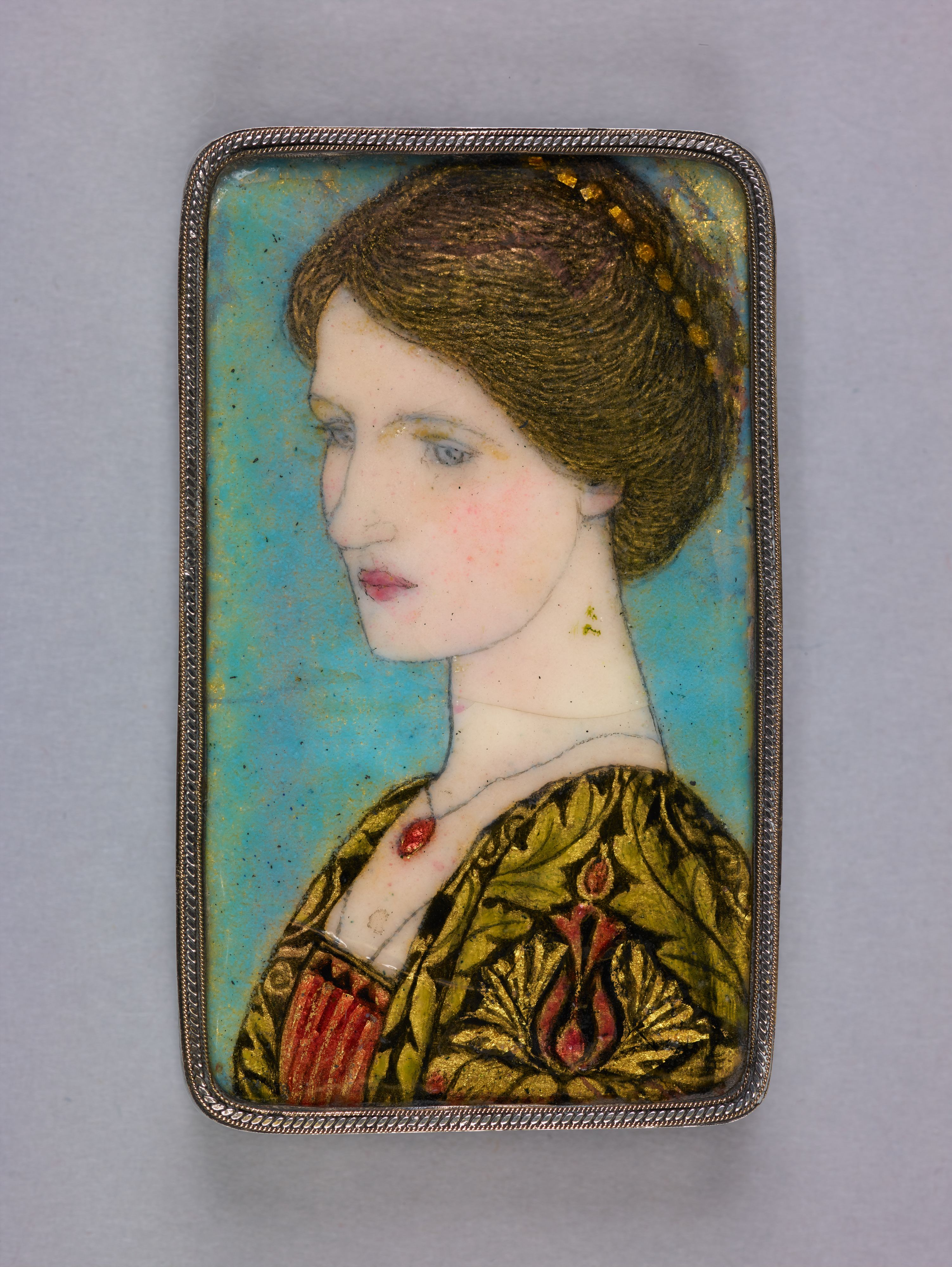
Plaquette portrait of Georgie Gaskin (1913), by her husband Arthur Gaskin, now in the collection of Birmingham Museums Trust

With her husband Arthur Gaskin, Georgie was one of the original members of the Birmingham Group of Artist-Craftsmen which formed around Joseph Southall in the 1890s, and reflected the influence of the Arts and Crafts movement at the Birmingham School of Art under the headmastership of Edward R. Taylor.

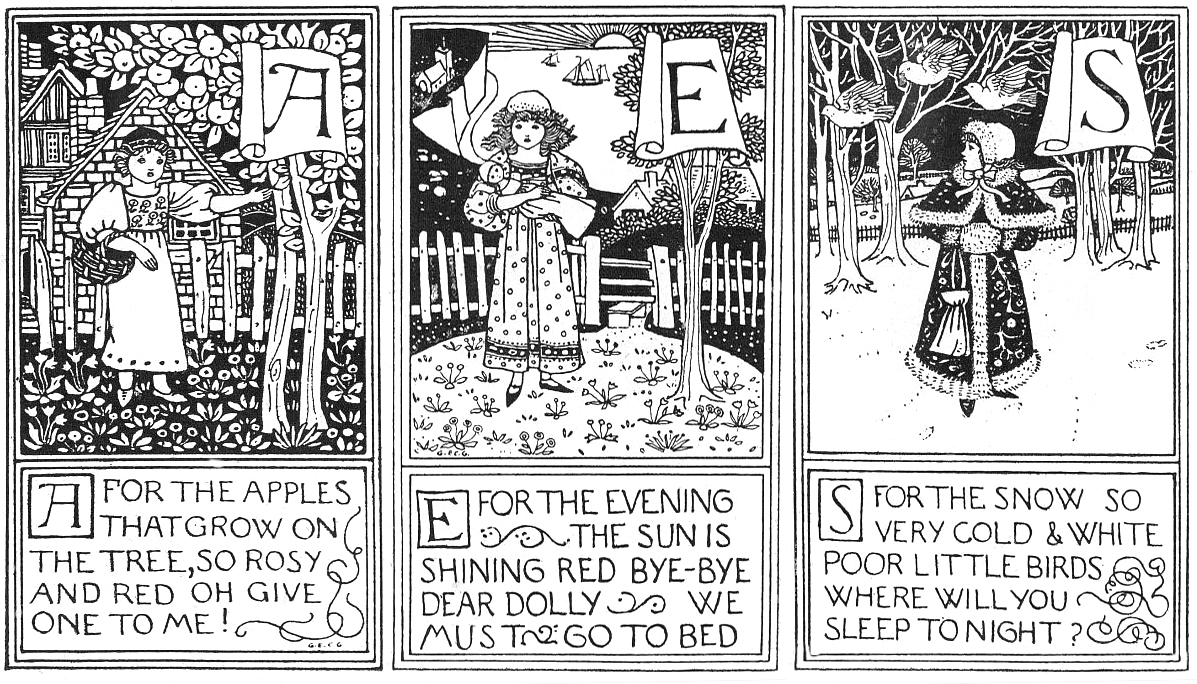
ABC an Alphabet (1895) by "Mrs Arthur Gaskin"

Georgie France was born in Shrewsbury, the elder daughter of William Hanmer France and Frances Emily Cave-Brown-Cave. She studied at the Birmingham School of Art, while there she met Arthur Gaskin, who also studied, as well as taught, there. They married on 21 March 1894. and had two daughters, Joscelyne (b. 1903) and Margaret (b. 1907). Arthur and Georgie Gaskin began their married life living in Acocks Green, Birmingham, before moving to Olton, Solihull. Another move, in 1924, took them to the High Street in Chipping Campden. A few years after Arthur's death in 1928, Georgie moved to West Malling, Kent where she died in 1934. They are buried together, in the churchyard of St James's Church in Chipping Campden.

The Gaskins were leading jewellers of the Arts and Crafts movement, mostly in the Birmingham area. In 1899 the Gaskins started producing jewellery together, under the name of Mr and Mrs Arthur Gaskin. Despite having no technical expertise initially, they learnt many skills and employed others where necessary. Georgie designed all of the jewellery that they made together, though both were involved in making it. They produced silver and enamel work, book illustrations and jewellery both independently and in partnership. Georgie's jewellery was initially quite simple, consisting of silver wirework set with coloured stones and enamel, as time went on it became more ornate, often being set with gems by the time of the First World War. She continued to design jewellery until shortly before her death.

The Birmingham Museum and Art Gallery holds the largest collection of the Gaskins' work in all media.

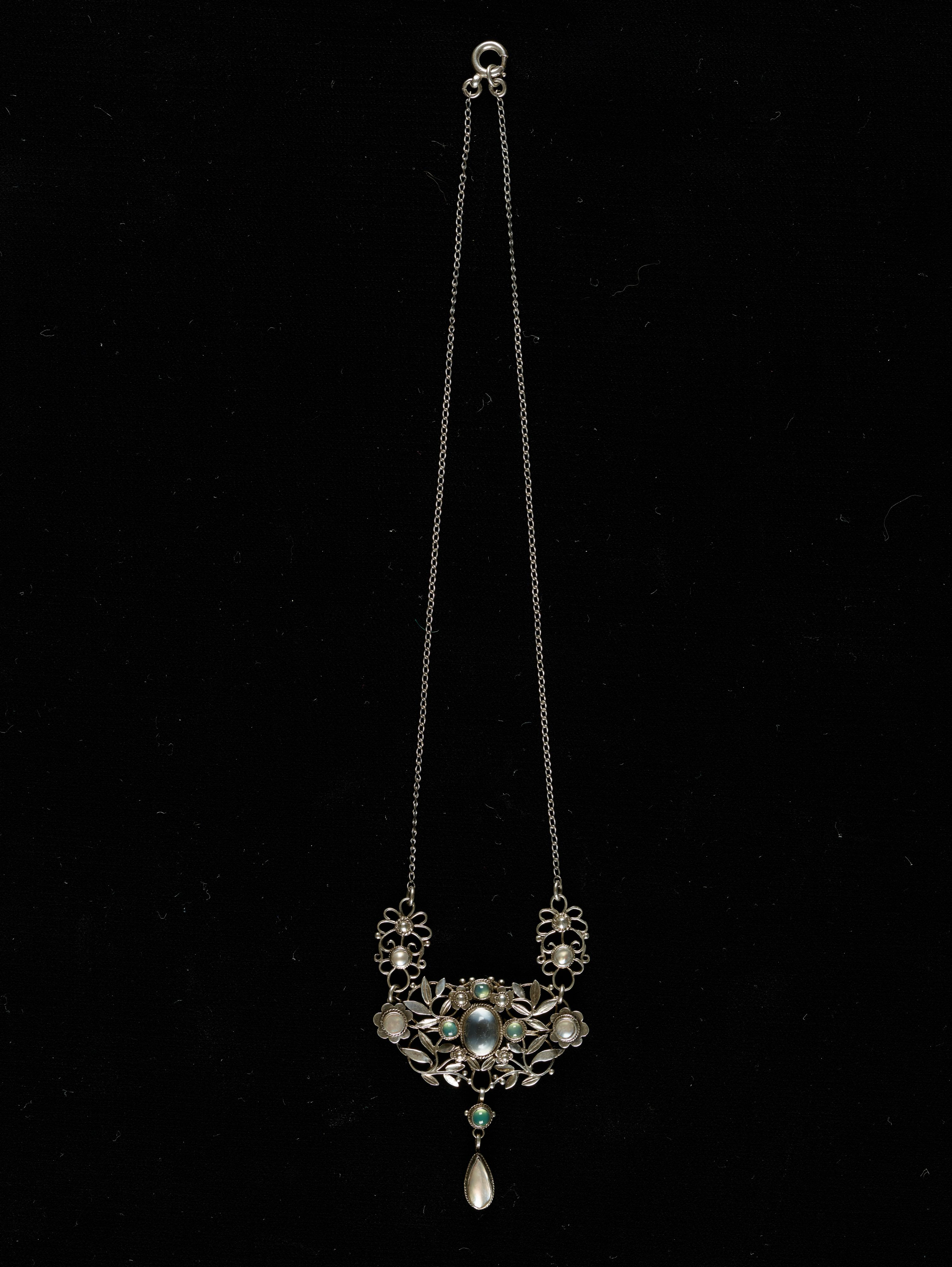
Necklace with pendant designed by Georgie Gaskin
