= William Smedley-Aston =

British artist (1868–1941)

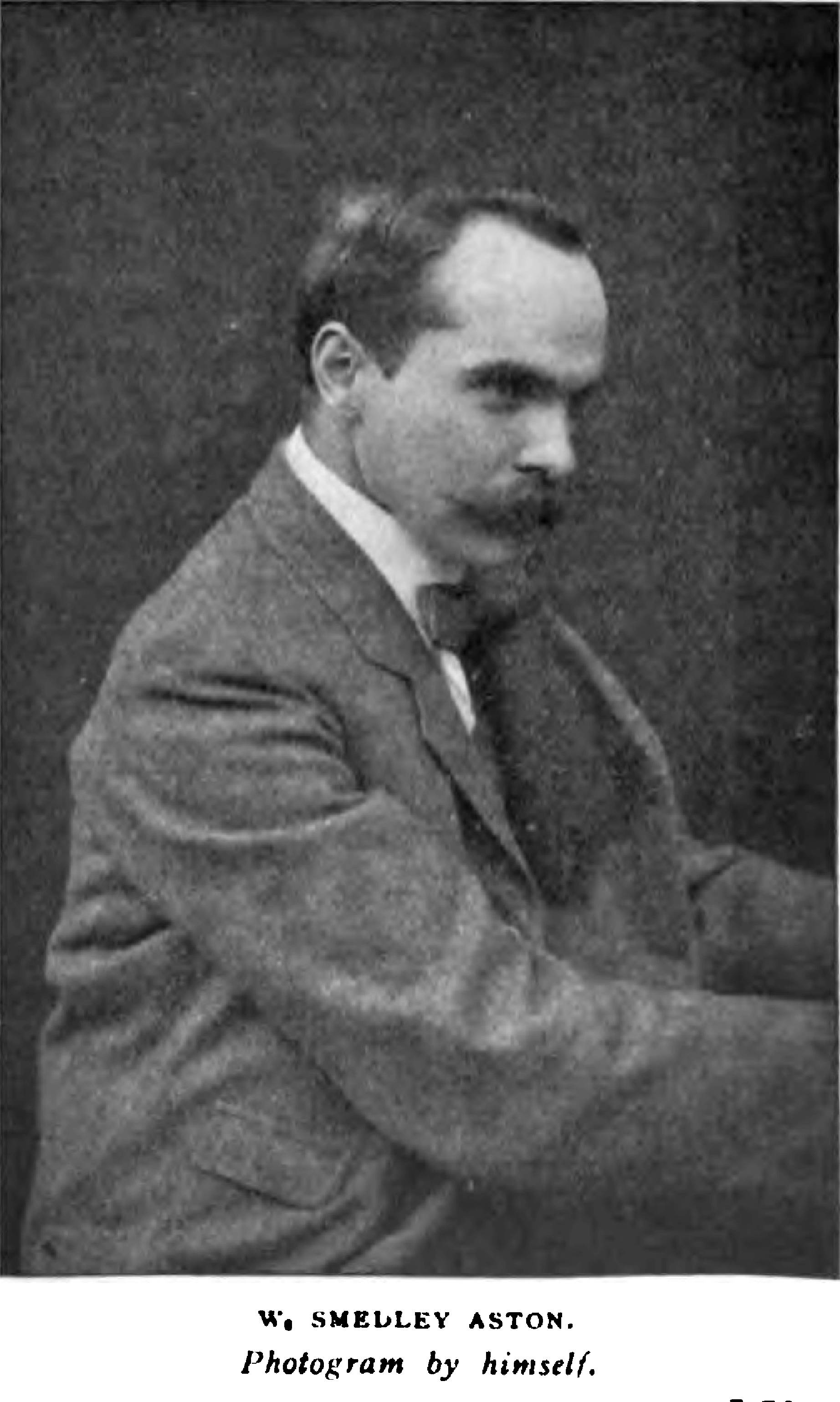
Smedley-Aston c. 1900

William Smedley-Aston (1868–1941) was with his wife Irene a Victorian Pre-Raphaelite Arts & Crafts photographer and member of the Birmingham Group of artists and the Linked Ring Brotherhood. He was also known as W. S. Aston or W. Smedley.

He was also instrumental in encouraging and financing early moving films or "Biographs" as they were initially known, through his firm the British Biograph Co.

He was married to Irene Smedley-Aston, who featured in many photographs, paintings, and drawings of the Arts and Crafts movement because the couple were friends with other members of the Birmingham School of Art and the Birmingham Group (artists) such as Joseph Southall, Arthur Gaskin and Maxwell Armfield. Armfield's wife Constance Smedley was William's first cousin. Constance was a successful writer who like her husband had attended Birmingham School of Art.

He lived at the William & Francis Radford designed villa townhouse 77 Holland Park W14 when in London and The Yew Trees, Henley-in-Arden, a 16th-century timbered house, which housed his famous collection of early English Furniture, Old Masters & very early English Glass. A valuation report by The Fine Art & General Insurance Company (now part of Aviva) for the glass held by the family from 1920 shows it was insured for £2,000 which with inflation in 2011 equated to £73,345. The collection was auctioned off in three sales (each three days long) by the auctioneers Grimleys throughout the 1920s and early 1930s. The Yewtrees is now three houses, having been sub-divided, and the five-acre gardens built upon.

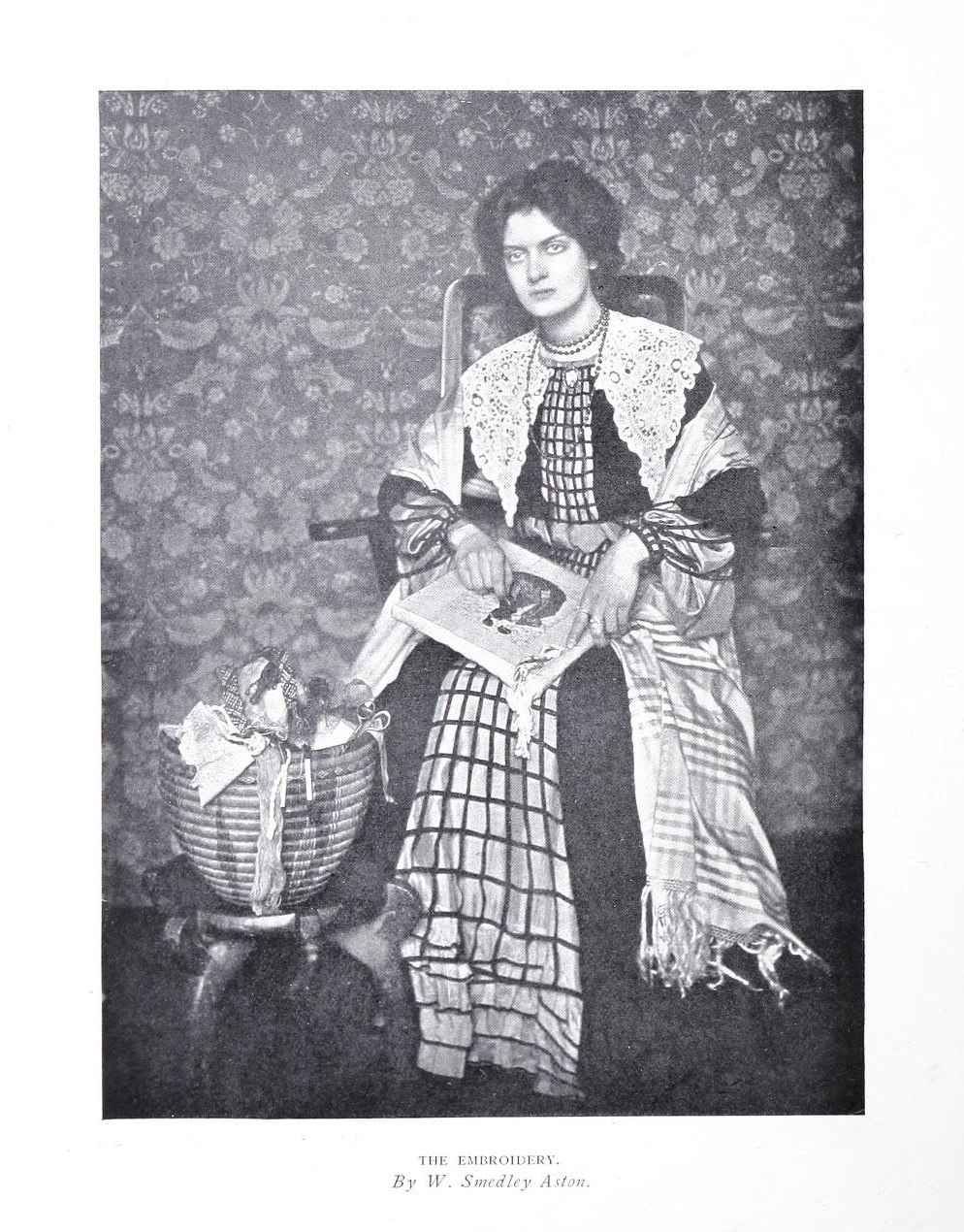
The Embroidery by William Smedley-Aston c.1904

Much of his collection is pictured in the book Early English Furniture & Woodwork. The collection was sold by the auctioneers Grimleys through a series of three sales.

They had three children:

- Michael Smedley-Aston – film director and producer who developed the early careers of Sean Connery and Peter Sellers, among others.
- Rosemary Smedley-Aston – medieval historian and wife of John Milward, one of the heirs to Milwards Needles and the Glencripesdale Estate. They lived at Barlow Woodseats Hall in Derbyshire.
- Ivo Smedley-Aston.

The family were relatives of John Smedley, who had constructed Riber Castle and whose company still exists as a luxury garment producer. William's brother, J. Herbert (Bert) Aston, founded what became (after its 1919 merger as Tube Investments Limited) TI Group, the world's largest tubing firm. In turn his son John Aston went on to run Reynolds Technology, which was part of TI Group, and included Raleigh bicycles
