= 1978 Queen's Birthday Honours (Australia) =

The 1978 Queen's Birthday Honours for Australia were appointments to recognise and reward good works by citizens of Australia and other nations that contribute to Australia. The Birthday Honours are awarded as part of the Queen's Official Birthday celebrations and were announced on 6 June 1978 in Australia.

The recipients of honours are displayed as they were styled before their new honour and arranged by honour with grades and then divisions i.e. Civil, Diplomatic and Military as appropriate.

== Order of Australia ==
The following appointments were made of the Order of Australia.

=== Dame (AD) ===
==== General Division ====
- Alexandra Margaret Martin, Lady Hasluck – For pre-eminent achievement in the fields of literature and history and for extraordinary and meritorious public service to Australia.

=== Companion (AC) ===
==== General Division ====
- Emeritus Professor William Macmahon Ball – For eminent and meritorious service to education and learning, particularly in the field of political science.
- The Honourable William Arthur Neilson – For eminent and meritorious service to politics and government.
- Alfred Moxon Simpson CMG – For eminent and meritorious service to business and industry.
- The Honourable Edward Gough Whitlam – For eminent and meritorious service to politics and government and to the Parliament of the Commonwealth of Australia.

=== Officer (AO) ===
==== General Division ====
- Professor John Beveridge – For distinguished service in the field of medicine, particularly as a clinical paediatrician.
- Robert William Brack – For distinguished service to industry, commerce and education.
- Major General Paul Alfred Cullen CBE, DSO, ED – For distinguished service to the community and to the welfare of ex-servicemen and women and their dependents.
- The Honourable Frederick Michael Daly – For distinguished service to the Parliament of the Commonwealth of Australia.
- Dr Louis Walter Davies – For distinguished service to science and industry.
- John Berkely Fitzhardinge MBE, ED – For distinguished service to yachting and to urban planning.
- Emeritus Professor Ronald Cecil Gates – For distinguished service to urban and town planning.
- The Reverend George Arthur Jenkins – For distinguished service to the community.
- Maxwell John Jillett – For distinguished public service and for service to the community.
- The Honourable Patrick John Kennelly – For distinguished service to the Parliaments of the Commonwealth of Australia and the State of Victoria.
- Alan Alfred Campbell Lind – For distinguished service to the community.
- Professor Richard Robert Haynes Lovell – For distinguished service to medicine, medical research and medical education.
- Alan McCrae Moorehead CBE – For distinguished service to literature.
- Emeritus Professor William Matthew O'Neill – For distinguished service to education and learning.
- Professor Sydney Arthur Prentice – For distinguished service in the field of electrical engineering.
- Dr Alfred Gordon Rowell CBE, ED – For distinguished service to the dental profession.
- Douglas William Stride – For distinguished service to banking.
- Brother Martin Boniface Sullivan – For distinguished community service, particularly to youth welfare.
- Reverend Thomas Henry Timpson – For distinguished service to education.

==== Military Division ====
Navy

- Surgeon Rear-Admiral Stephen John Lloyd QHS – For distinguished service to the Medical Branch of the Royal Australian Navy.

Army

- Brigadier Ernest Laurence Palmer – For distinguished service to the Ordnance service of the Australian Army.
- Brigadier John Hancock Studdert OBE – For distinguished service as the Deputy Chief of Army Materiel.

Air Force

- Air Commodore Ronald Arthur Hargreaves – For distinguished service to the Engineering Branch of the Royal Australian Air Force.
- Air Commodore Geoffrey Gordon Michael OBE, AFC – For distinguished service to the Royal Australian Air Force.

=== Member (AM) ===
==== General Division ====
- Donald Leslie Judson Aitchison – For public service and for services to the community.
- Nigel Andrew Winter Ashton – For services to town planning.
- Ronald Barassi – For services to the sport of Australian Football.
- Walter Edward Victor Boud AFC – For public service, particularly in the field of aviation safety.
- Kathleen Audrey Bourke – For services to the community, particularly in the field of welfare services.
- Gordon Craig Brown JP – For services to the community and in providing architectural services to hospitals and welfare organisations.
- Allan James Campbell OBE – For services to the community.
- John William Hurtle Coumbe JP – For parliamentary service and for services to local government.
- Dr John Bice Day ED – For services to the dental profession.
- Samuel Bowcher Denton – For services to education and the community.
- The Reverend James Hay Downing – For services in the field of Aboriginal welfare.
- Raymond Keith Dunn – For public service, particularly as Director-General, Public Buildings Department, South Australia.
- The Very Reverend Richard Owen Dykes – For services to religion and the community.
- Robert Anders Footner – For services to the rubber manufacturing industry.
- William Thomas Stephen Frost – For services to local government and the community.
- Dr Nigel John Gray – For services to medicine, particularly in the field of cancer.
- Livingstone Ralph Grey – For services to local government and to the community.
- Keith Victor Hateley – For services in the field of conservation.
- Mary Bridget Holmes – For services to the community.
- Gordon Douglas Johnson – For services to local government.
- Dr Gordon Kerridge – For services to the community.
- Frederick Albert Roland Killick – For services to local government and the community.
- Stephen Henry Knight – For services to local government and the community.
- Anthony Sylvester Luchetti – For parliamentary service and for services to local government.
- Edgar Metcalfe – For services to the performing arts.
- Peter Owen Miller – For services to the building industry.
- Sidney Muller – For services to the Jewish community.
- James Angus Nelson – For services to the welfare of handicapped persons.
- Jack Oatey – For services to the sport of Australian football.
- Raymond Fitzgerald O'Halloran – For services to the community.
- Norman Cyril Osborn – For services to the welfare of ex-servicemen.
- Thomas Lenton Parr – For services to the arts and to sculpture.
- Betty Rayner – For services to children's theatre.
- Joan Rayner – For services to children's theatre.
- Norah May Renney – For services to the community, particularly to the welfare of the young and the aged.
- Mabel Joy Cowens Richardson – For services to the community, particularly the care and welfare of animals.
- Robert Baddeley Simpson – For services to the sport of cricket.
- Geoff Forbes Sorell JP – For services to sport and the community.
- Peter Gerald Spillett JP – For services to the community.
- Anthony Gerald Steel – For services to the arts and as Artistic Director of the Adelaide Festival of Arts.
- James Philip Toohey – For services to trade unionism and to politics.
- Angus Roy Tasker Tuck – For services to the community.
- Arthur Augustus Weir MM – For services to the sport of hockey.
- The Reverend Henry Thomas Wells – For services to religion.
- Geoffrey Gordon Collins Wolley – For services to the community

==== Military Division ====
Navy

- Captain Nigel Richard Benbow Berlyn – For exceptional performance of duty as Project Director of the Guided Missile Frigate acquisition programme.
- Commander Jeremy Nicholas Lattin – For exceptional service and performance of duty at the Harold E. Holt Naval Communication Station.
- Superintending Sister Eileen Harrison Lawrie – For exceptional performance of duty in the Royal Australian Navy Nursing Service.

Army

- Lieutenant-Colonel Arthur James Fittock – For exceptional performance of duty as the Commanding Officer of 1st Field Engineer Regiment.
- Lieutenant-Colonel Ronald George Lange – For exceptional service to the Australian Army.
- Colonel Kevin Lachlan MacPherson – For exceptional and dedicated service to the Australian Army.
- Lieutenant-Colonel Kristian Raymond Schlyder – For exceptional performance of duty as Commanding Officer of 2/4 Battalion, Royal Australian Regiment.
- Lieutenant-Colonel Philip Graeme Skelton – For exceptional performance of duty as Commanding Officer of 2 Signal Regiment, Watsonia, Victoria.
- Lieutenant-Colonel William Victor Windeyer ED – For exceptional service to the Army Reserve in New South Wales.

Air Force

- Group Captain Reginald Ronald Yeoman Candy – For exceptional service to the Equipment Branch of the Royal Australian Air Force.
- Wing Commander Peter Richard Degotardi – For exceptional service as an anaesthetist specialising in intensive care and aeromedical evacuation procedures.
- Wing Commander Desmond Joseph Gordon – For exceptional service to the Royal Australian Air Force Staff College, Fairbairn A.C.T.
- Wing Commander Carl Peter Ring AFC – For exceptional performance of duty as Commanding Officer of No. 5 Squadron, Fairbairn, A.C.T.

== Knight Bachelor ==
- Richard Kingsland CBE, DFC – For distinguished public service.
- Colonel Malcolm (Hugh) McArthur OBE – For distinguished service to the meat industry.
- Robert (Evelyn) Porter – For distinguished service to local government and the community.
- John (Seymour) Proud – For distinguished service to the mining industry.
- Kenneth (Harold) Vial CBE – For distinguished service to transport.
- Senator the Honourable Reginald (Charles) Wright – For distinguished public and parliamentary service.
