= Constance Smedley =

British artist and author

- Born: Anne Constance Smedley; 20 June 1876; Handsworth, West Midlands, England
- Died: 9 March 1941 (aged 64); West Wycombe, England
- Education: Birmingham School of Art
- Spouse: Maxwell Armfield (m. 1909)
- Relatives: William Smedley-Aston (cousin); Diana Armfield (niece)

Anne Constance Smedley (20 June 1876 – 9 March 1941) was a British artist, playwright, author and founder of the International Association of Lyceum Clubs.

== Life ==
Smedley was born in Handsworth near Birmingham in 1876. Her well-off and educated parents allowed their daughter to become a student at the Birmingham School of Art. Smedley lived with disabilities that are thought to have come from childhood polio. Despite some artistic success her interest turned to writing plays.

In 1909 she married the artist Maxwell Armfield. She was the first cousin of his friend and fellow artist William Smedley-Aston. Like many with connections to the Arts and Crafts Movement in Birmingham they settled in the Cotswolds. In the 1911 census, they both appear as resident in Minchinhampton (Gloucestershire). The couple became close collaborators: working together to combine design, illustration, text and theatre. Smedley encouraged her husband to become a pacifist and Christian Scientist. She also had a strong influence on her godchild Joan Ellen Rayner who had come from Australia to study social work in England. After she met Smedley she decided to study acting instead - which became her (and Rayner's sister's) life's work. Smedley had founded the Greenleaf Theatre which was a new approach to acting. In 1925 the Rayner sisters came from Australia to learn and work in the theatre.

Smedley was a prolific author and she was embarrassed by being a female member of her writers' club. She approached the club with the support of Christina Gowans Whyte, Elsa Hahn, Violet Alcock, and an American, Jessie Trimble. She proposed changes to the club but her ideas were refused. She realised that women needed a respectable club that offered good hospitality. Aspiring career women needed a place where they could entertain without having to invite people to their homes. She formed a committee and despite writing to 60 writers they found only two extra supporters. Smedley's father offered to fund a clubhouse if she could find a 1,000 members.

Jessie Trimble proposed that the new club be called the Lyceum Club and the new committee arranged for Smedley to meet Lady Frances Balfour. By now the committee had decided to extend their net for new members from writers to professional women and even the daughters or wives of prominent men. Balfour agreed to lead the new club and served as chair for 15 years.

She placed an advert in the "English Women's Yearbook". Smedley became the founder of the International Association of Lyceum Clubs. The clubhouse was at 128 Piccadilly where there was an art gallery and here the club offered not only a Gentleman's Club for women but also advice for members' careers and an introduction to other clubs that grew around the world.

From 1915 the couple spent seven years in the United States.

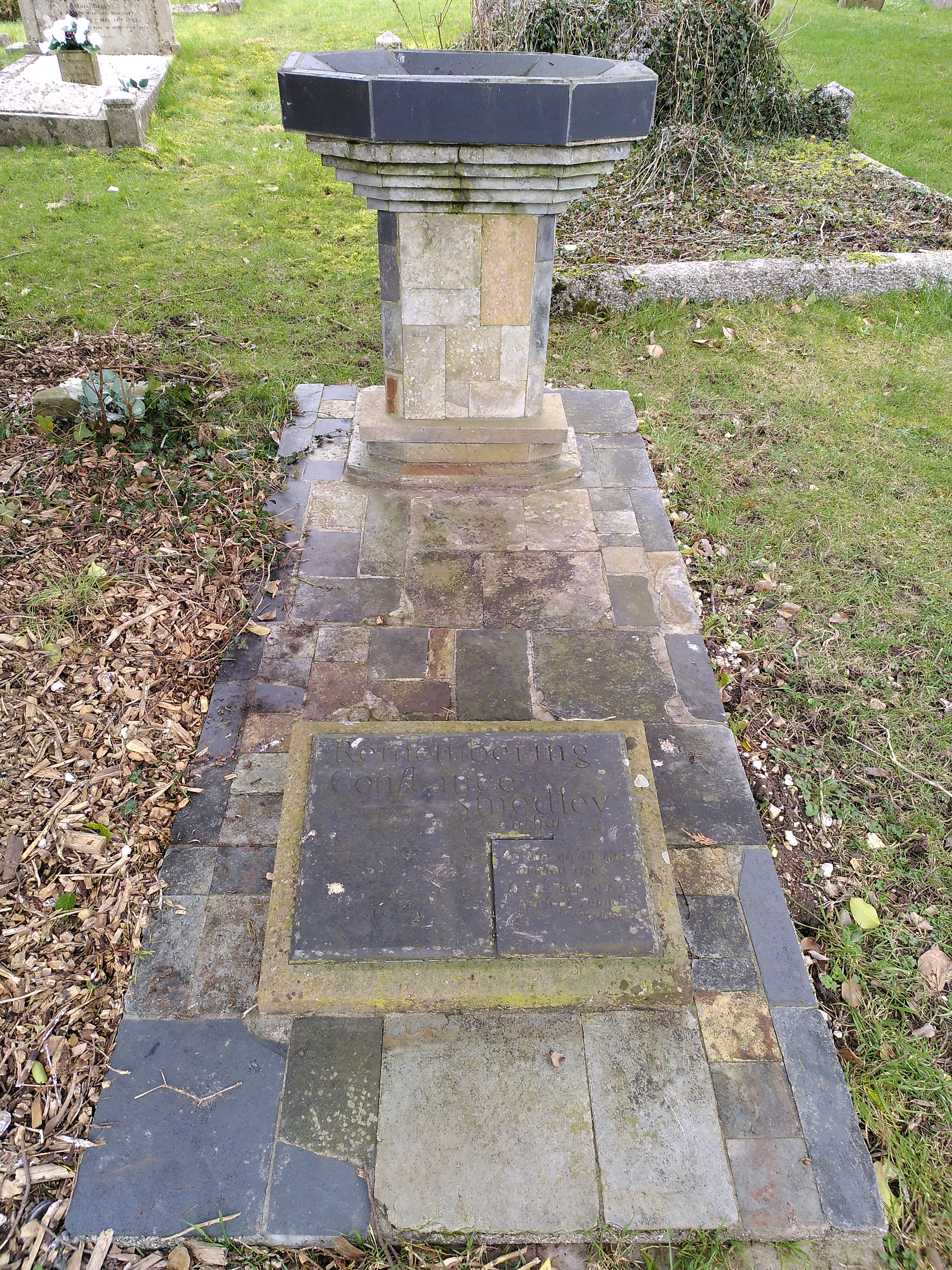
The grave of Constance Smedley in St Lawrence's churchyard, West Wycombe.

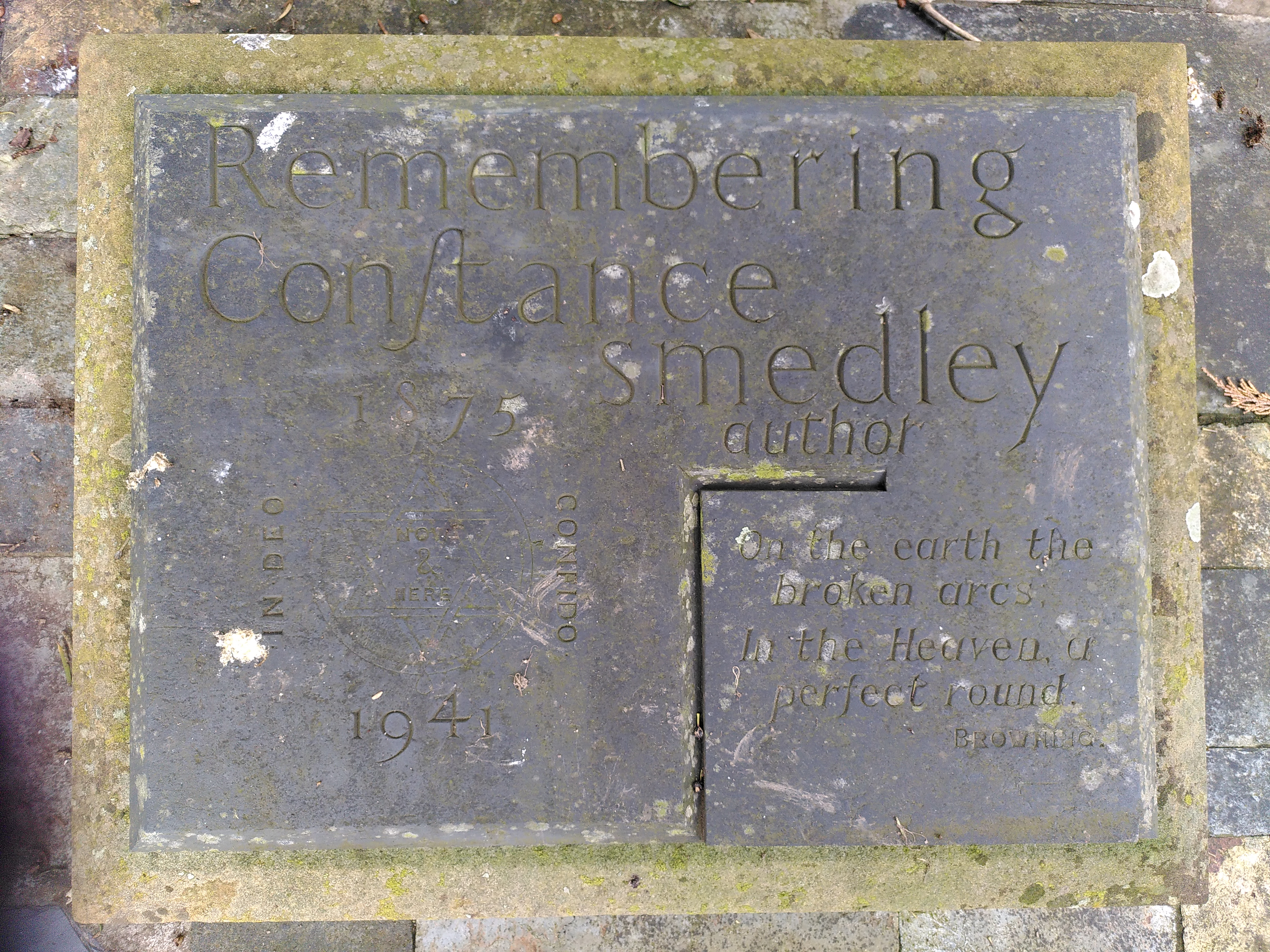
Plaque on the grave of Constance Smedley in St Lawrence's churchyard, West Wycombe.

Smedley died in West Wycombe, and was buried in the churchyard of St Lawrence.

== Legacy ==
There is a painting of her by her husband which was made in 1906.

In 2010 Stroud Theatre players performed a play based on the life of Smedley titled "The Amazing and Preposterous Constance Smedley" in Cheltenham.

== Works ==
- Constance Smedley (1899) Mrs Jordan (one-act play)
- Constance Smedley (1907). "The Civic Rights of the Married Woman". The Case for Women's Suffrage: 99–105. Wikidata Q107206174.
