= Joan Rayner =

New Zealand-Australian theatre educator (1900–1999)

Joan Rayner AM
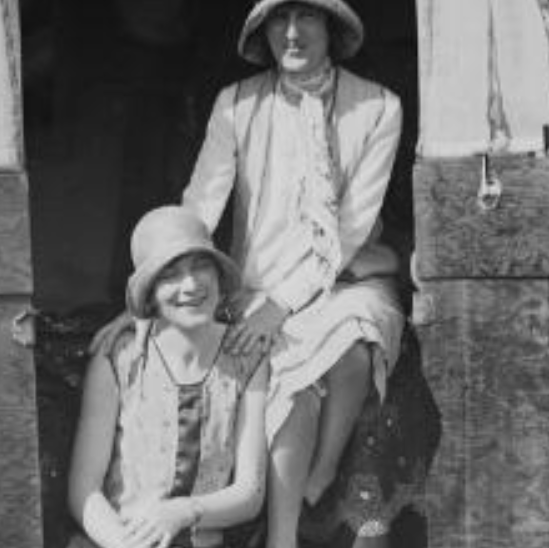
- in November 1929
- Born: 8 December 1900; Dunedin, New Zealand
- Died: 11 March 1999 (aged 98); Wantirna South, Victoria, Australia
- Relatives: Constance Smedley (godmother)

Joan Ellen Rayner AM (8 December 1900 – 11 March 1999) was a New Zealand-born Australian theatre educator. She and her sister, Rhoda Elspeth (Betty) Rayner, founded the Australian Children's Theatre in 1948.

== Life ==
Rayner was born in New Zealand, like her mother, Rhona Blanche (née Duckworth). She was born in Dunedin in 1900. Her father Frederick Richards Rayner was an artist who had been born in Wales. On 16 May 1907, her sister, Betty, was born and they would spend their lives mostly together. The family's finances varied and when there was sufficient money she and her sister received a private education. She went to England to study social work where she re-met her godmother Constance Smedley. Smedley had original ideas about theatre and had started the Greenleaf Theatre – she visualised a "A universal travelling theatre, directly in contact with the community". After Joan met Smedley she decided to study the theatre and acting instead. She returned home and she enthused her younger sister. In 1925 they both went to work at Smedley's Greenleaf Theatre where they both learned about acting. They travelled in France and Germany, but by 1929 they were back in Sydney creating a youth theatre and being pictured with their caravan. (having fallen out with Smedley.) They returned to tour Europe and in Britain they used another of their caravans to take their theatre to English villages.

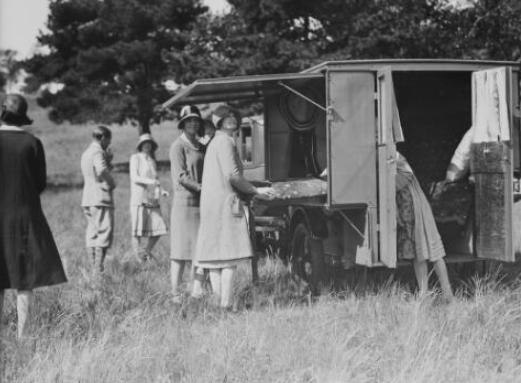
Joan and Betty Rayner and their caravan in Centennial Park in Sydney in November 1929

The Rayner sisters started a "universal travelling theatre, directly in contact with the community" as Constance Smedley had imagined.

From 1943 to 1946 they were entertaining troops as a part of the Entertainments National Service Association.

In 1948 she and her sister created the Australian Children's Theatre.

In the 1978 Queen's Birthday Honours, she was made a member of the Order of Australia because of her work for children's theatre.

== Death and legacy ==
Rayner died in 1999 in the Melbourne suburb of Wantirna South. Six years earlier she had founded the Australian Children's Theatre Foundation to support the Australian Children's theatre and to celebrate the work of the Rayner sisters. It is estimated that the sisters demonstrated live theatre to two million Australian children.

There is a 1941 recording of Joan and her sister singing in the Library of Congress.
