= Bernard Dunstan =

British artist, teacher, and author (1920–2017)

Bernard Dunstan RA PPRWA
- Born: Andrew Harold Bernard Dunstan; 19 January 1920; Teddington, Middlesex, England
- Died: 20 August 2017 (aged 97)
- Education: Colet Court; St Paul's School, Erik Sthyr; Byam Shaw School of Art (1939), Francis Ernest Jackson; Slade School of Fine Arts (1939–41), Allan Gwynne-Jones
- Known for: Artist; teacher; author
- Spouse: Diana Armfield (m. 1949)
- Children: 3
- Parents: Dr Albert Dunstan (father); Louisa Cleaverley (mother)
- Elected: New English Art Club (1947); RWA Academician (1940s); Royal Academician (9 July 1968); President of the RWA (1979–84)

Bernard Dunstan (19 January 1920 – 20 August 2017) was a British artist, teacher, and author, best known for his studies of figures in interiors and landscapes. At the time of his death, he was the longest serving Royal Academician.

== Life and work ==
Bernard Dunstan was born in Teddington, Middlesex, in 1920. He studied at Byam Shaw School of Art in 1939, then at the Slade School of Fine Art in London from 1939 to 1941. In 1947 he was elected a member of the New English Art Club, and was president of the Royal West of England Academy from 1979 to 1984. In 1968 he was made a full member of the Royal Academy.

Dunstan taught at the Royal West of England Academy in Bristol from 1946 to 1949, the Camberwell School of Art from 1950 to 1964, the Byam Shaw School from 1953 to 1974, the Ravensbourne Art College (now the Ravensbourne College of Design and Communication) from 1959 to 1964, and City and Guilds of London Art School from 1964 to 1969.

Artists whose influence informed his painting include Renoir, Bonnard, Vuillard, Walter Sickert, and Philip Wilson Steer.

His works are represented in the National Portrait Gallery, the Royal Collection, Windsor, and the Museum of London. He wrote a number of books on painting, including Painting Methods of the Impressionists (1976).

== Personal life ==
Dunstan was married to fellow painter and Royal Academician Diana Armfield, who survives him. They shared a home in Kew, south-west London

He died on 20 August 2017, aged 97.
