= Maxwell Armfield =

English painter (1881–1972)

- Self-Portrait (1901), Tempera on sketching board
- Born: Maxwell Ashby Armfield; 5 October 1881; Ringwood, Hampshire, England
- Died: 23 January 1972 (aged 90); Warminster, Wiltshire, England
- Education: Birmingham School of Art, Académie de la Grande Chaumière
- Known for: painting, tempera
- Movement: Arts and Crafts movement Birmingham Group
- Spouse: Constance Smedley (m. 1909; died 1941)
- Relatives: Diana Armfield (niece)

Maxwell Ashby Armfield (5 October 1881 – 23 January 1972) was an English artist, illustrator and writer.

== Biography ==
Born to a Quaker family in Ringwood, Hampshire, Armfield was educated at Sidcot School and at Leighton Park School. In 1887 he was admitted to the Birmingham School of Art, then under the headmastership of Edward R. Taylor and considered a major centre of the Arts and Crafts movement. There he studied under Henry Payne and Arthur Gaskin and, outside of the school, received instruction in tempera painting from Joseph Southall at Southall's studio in Edgbaston.

Armfield was later to recall:

Apart from invaluable benefit from guidance and advice from such masters as Henry Payne, Arthur Gaskin and Joseph Southall, I really taught myself, as must any one who hopes to do individual work... I detested the Life Class, and rarely attended it: I refused to learn perspective or anatomy as they bored me, and generally, I could not have been a worse student.

Leaving Birmingham in 1902, Armfield moved to Paris to study at the Académie de la Grande Chaumière under Gustave Courtois and Émile-René Ménard, where he became an associate of Gaston Lachaise, Keith Henderson, and Norman Wilkinson. He exhibited at the Paris Salon in 1904, where his painting Faustine was bought by the French State and donated to the Musée du Luxembourg, and is now in the Musée d'Orsay, Paris.

In 1909 he married the author and playwright Constance Smedley, who was the first cousin of his friend and fellow artist William Smedley-Aston and his wife Irene. Like many with connections to the Arts and Crafts movement in Birmingham, the couple settled in the Cotswolds: in 1911, they appear on the census of that year as resident in Minchinhampton, Gloucestershire. The couple became close collaborators, working together to combine design, illustration, text and theatre. Armfield's wife also influenced him to become a pacifist and Christian Scientist.

From 1915 the couple spent seven years in the United States.

In 1946 Armfield released the book Tempera Painting Today, published by Pentagon Press.

Armfield has paintings in the collection of several British institutions including Derby Art Gallery, Southampton and Nottingham Gallery and the Russell-Cotes Art Gallery.

A detail from Armfield's painting Self-Portrait (1901; Birmingham Museum and Art Gallery), was used as the cover illustration of the Oxford World's Classics 2006 edition of The Picture of Dorian Gray.

The painting used for the cover of the 1969 Fleetwood Mac album Then Play On is from a mural by Armfield that was originally designed for the dining room of a London mansion.
