= Leisure Painter magazine =

Leisure Painter is a learn-to-paint magazine, first published in 1967. It is published monthly by Warners Group Publications, based in Bourne, Lincolnshire, and costs £5.25 from newsagents, supermarkets and art shops. The magazine's editor is Ingrid Lyon.

Leisure Painter magazine gives step-by-step tuition to beginners and amateur painters, as well as advice on drawing and painting. Art tutors - including David Bellamy, Pamela Kay and Tony Paul - set projects, describe their working methods, and offer tips and hints for readers.

The magazine's articles include practical instruction on drawing and painting in different media; competitions and special offers; monthly critiques of readers' work; questions from readers answered; reports by art tutors on art materials, products, books and DVDs; updates on open competitions, exhibitions and art-related events; and workshops and holidays in the UK and abroad tutored by professional artists.

The magazine's website, PaintersOnline, was launched in September 2007. PaintersOnline is an online community, including a forum for sharing experiences and advice; blogs; a gallery to upload images of visitors’ drawings and paintings; and a searchable database of art clubs and art tutors.
