= Birmingham Group (artists) =

The Birmingham Group, sometimes called the Birmingham School, was an informal collective of painters and craftsmen associated with the Arts and Crafts Movement, that worked in Birmingham, England in the late 19th and early 20th centuries. All of its members studied or taught at the Birmingham School of Art after the reorganisation of its teaching methods by Edward R. Taylor in the 1880s, and it was the School that formed the group's primary focus. Members of the group also overlapped with other more formal organisations, including the Birmingham Guild of Handicraft, the Ruskin Pottery and the Bromsgrove Guild of Applied Arts.

The Group formed one of the last outposts of late Romanticism in the visual arts, and an important link between the last of the Pre-Raphaelites and the new Slade Symbolists.

== History ==
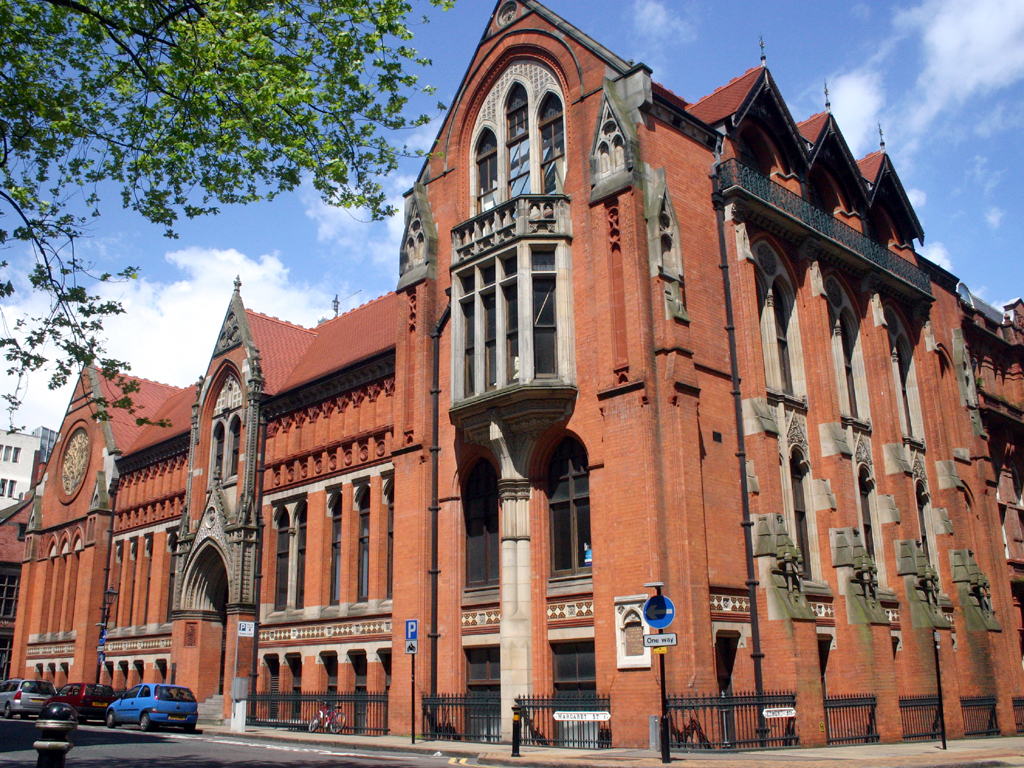
The Birmingham School of Art

They began to form in an informal manner in the 1890s. Many were later to become teachers in Birmingham (especially the great Birmingham Municipal School of Art under Edward R. Taylor), and this meant that the Edward Burne-Jones style influenced all those who studied at the Birmingham art schools. Many were also heavily influenced by the ideas and practices of John Ruskin and William Morris, and had indeed personally known those men. Several had undertaken work for the Kelmscott Press, with Charles March Gere producing the famous frontispiece to News from Nowhere. Many, unable to support themselves only through their art, also became fine crafts makers as well as teachers.

There was initially no formal membership, but during the 1930s they were known to have had a membership secretary.

Some of their members later became part of the Birmingham Surrealists group of artists, thus carrying to English Surrealism the rich vein of Romantic concern with emotional states in pictures, with myth and fantasy, with visions, and with a "natural supernaturalist" experience conveyed through art. The Birmingham Surrealists had made contact with the London Surrealist Group around 1940 and ex Birmingham Group members such as Emmy Bridgwater exhibited at the International Surrealist show in Paris in 1947. (See: Birmingham Museum & Art Gallery, Surrealism in Birmingham: 1935–1954 (2001).

The Fine Art Society held an extensive exhibition of Birmingham Group works in 1969. The galleries of the Birmingham Group's works formed a keystone of the major The Last Romantics exhibition at the Barbican in 1989.

== Key works ==
Hortus Inclusus (1898) by Joseph Southall

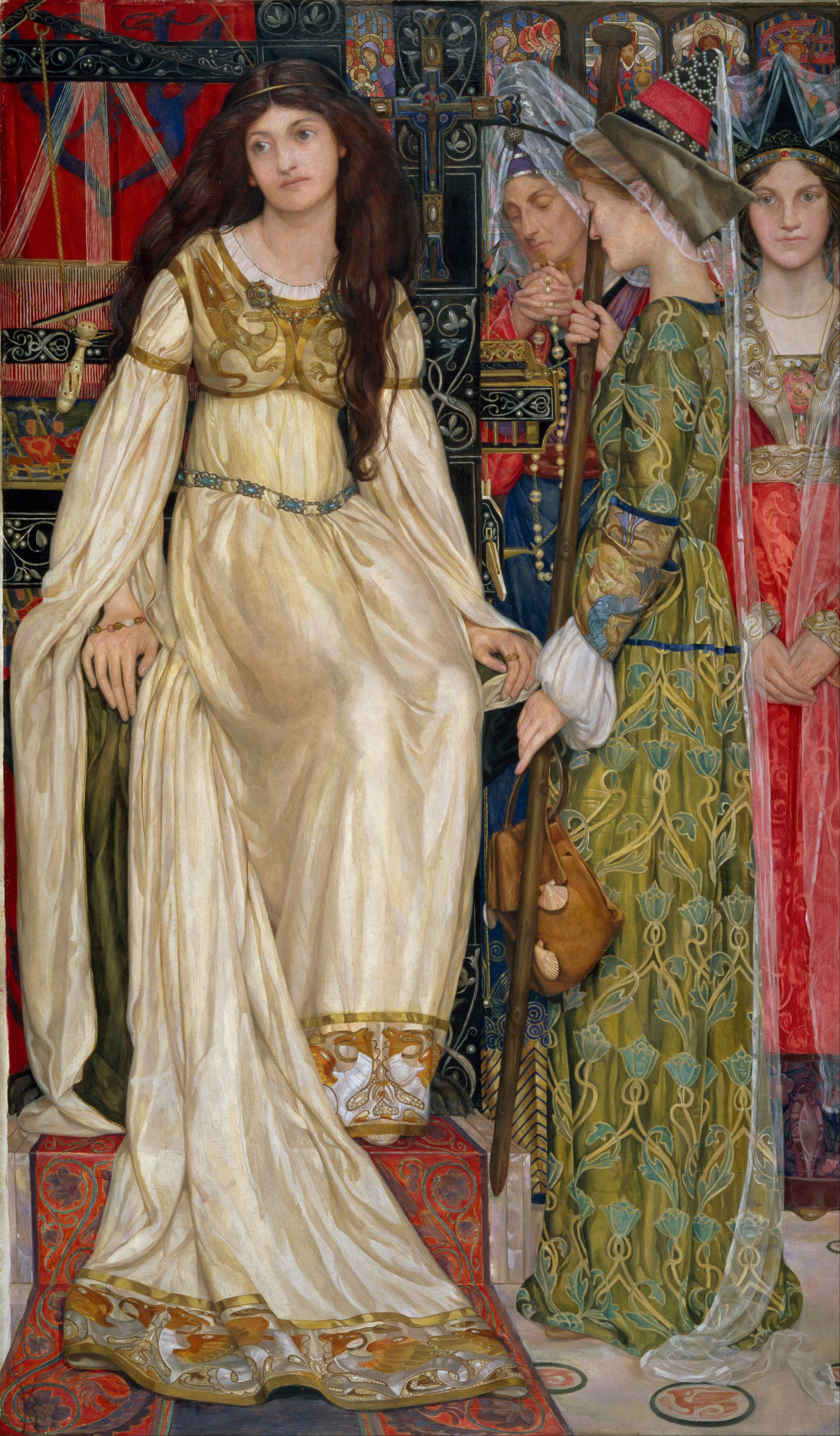
The Keepsake (1898) by Kate Bunce

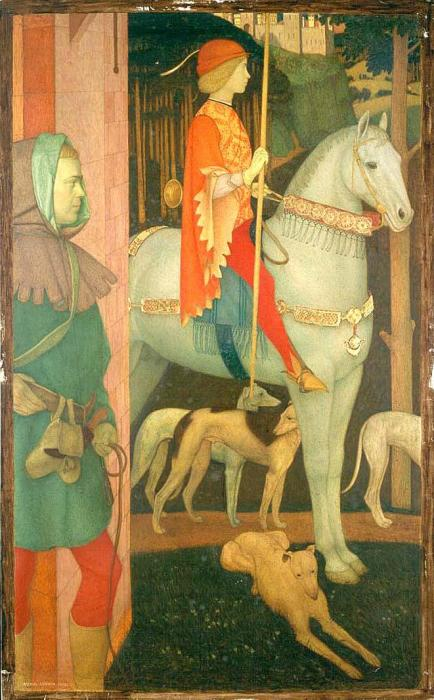
Kilhwych, The King's Son (1901) by Arthur Gaskin

Self-Portrait (1901) by Maxwell Armfield

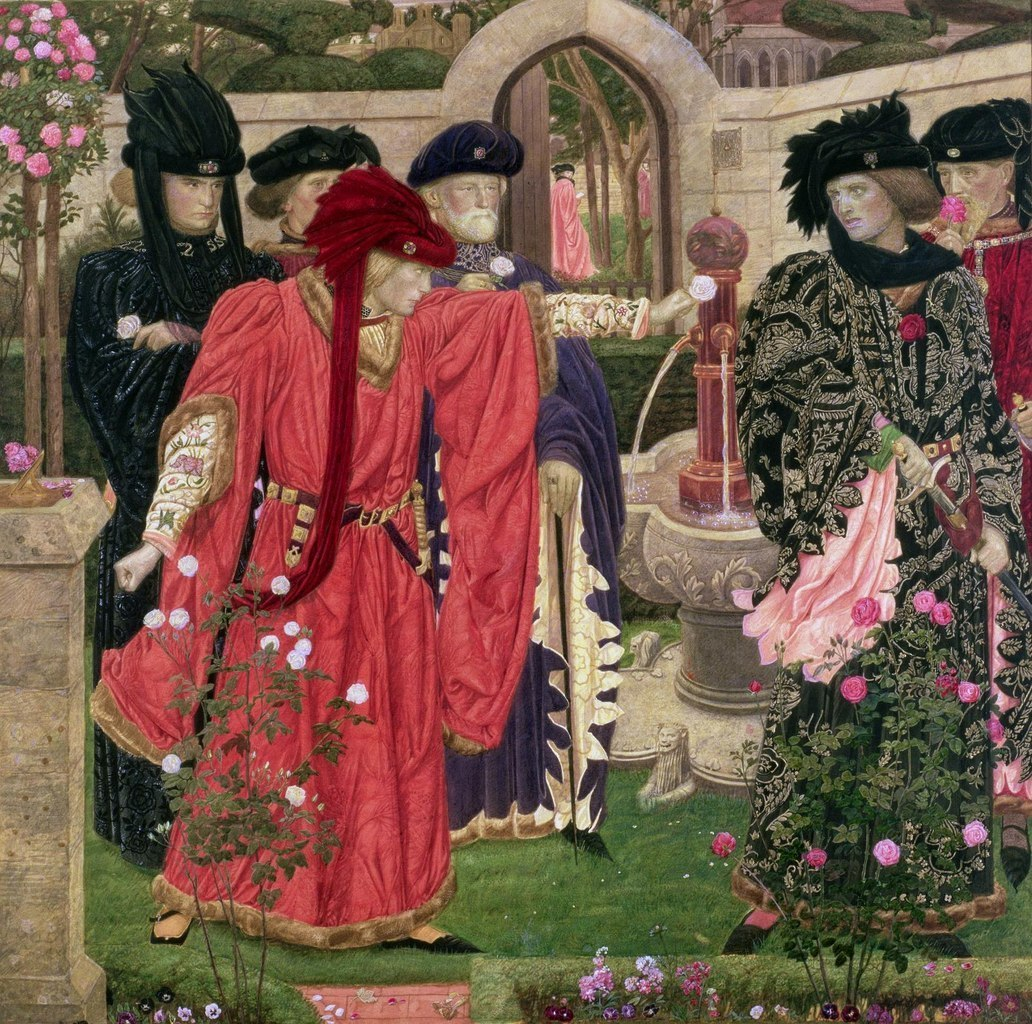
Choosing the Red and White Roses in the Temple Garden (1908) by Henry Payne

== Members ==
- Maxwell Armfield (1881–1972)
- Emmy Bridgwater (1906–1999)
- Benjamin Creswick (1853–1946)
- Arthur Gaskin (1862–1928)
- Celia Levetus (1874-1936)
- Conroy Maddox (1912–2005)
- Charles March Gere (1869–1957)
- John Melville (1902–1986)
- Sidney Meteyard (1868–1947)
- Edmund Hort New (1871-1931)
- Mary J. Newill (1860-1947)
- Henry Payne (1868–1940)
- Frederick Cayley Robinson
- Bernard Sleigh (1872–1954)
- William Smedley-Aston (1868–1941)
- Joseph Southall (1861–1944)

== See also ==
- Art of Birmingham

== Bibliography ==
- Crawford, Alan (1984), "The Birmingham Setting: A Curious Mixture of Bourgeoisie and Romance", in Crawford, Alan (ed.), By Hammer and Hand: the Arts and Crafts Movement in Birmingham, Birmingham: Birmingham Museums & Art Gallery, pp. 27–40, ISBN 0709301197
