= Louis Davis =

Louis Davis may refer to:

- Chip Davis (born 1947), born Louis F. Davis, American musician
- Louis Davis (architect) (1884–1962), American architect
- Louis Davis (painter) (1860–1941), British artist

== See also ==
- Lou Davis (1881–1961), American songwriter
- Louis Davies (disambiguation)
