= Billy Armfield =

English footballer (1904–1985)

Personal information
- Full name: William Christopher Armfield
- Date of birth: 7 July 1904
- Date of death: 1 October 1985 (aged 81)
- Position: Forward

Senior career*
Years	Team	Apps	(Gls)
1923-28	Aston Villa	12	(2)
1929-1932	Exeter City	72	(14)
1932	Gillingham	30	(7)
1933	Droitwich		
- * Club domestic league appearances and goals

William Christopher Armfield (7 July 1904 – 1985) was an English professional footballer of the 1930s. Born in Birmingham, he joined Gillingham from Exeter City in 1932 and went on to make 30 appearances for the club in The Football League, scoring seven goals. He left to join non-league Droitwich in 1933.
