= Joseph Southall =

British painter (1861–1944)

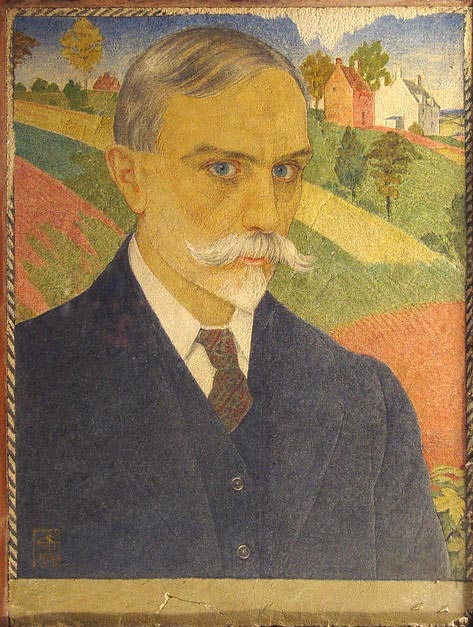
- Self-Portrait (1925), Buon Fresco panel in wooden case
- Born: 23 August 1861; Nottingham, England
- Died: 6 November 1944 (aged 83); Birmingham, England
- Education: Birmingham School of Art
- Known for: painting; tempera; political cartoons; decorative arts; murals
- Movement: Arts and Crafts movement; Birmingham Group

Joseph Edward Southall RWS NEAC RBSA (23 August 1861 – 6 November 1944) was an English painter associated with the Arts and Crafts movement.

A leading figure in the nineteenth and early twentieth-century revival of painting in tempera, Southall was the leader of the Birmingham Group of Artist-Craftsmen—one of the last outposts of Romanticism in the visual arts, and an important link between the later Pre-Raphaelites and the turn of the century Slade Symbolists.

A lifelong Quaker, Southall was an active socialist and pacifist, initially as a radical member of the Liberal Party and later of the Independent Labour Party.

Southall was elected an Associate of the Royal Birmingham Society of Artists (RBSA) in 1898 and Member in 1902. He became President of the Society in 1939 and stayed in this post until his death in 1944.

== Biography ==
=== Early life ===
Joseph Southall was born to a Quaker family in Nottingham in 1861. His father, a pharmacist, died a little over a year later, and the young Southall and his mother moved to Edgbaston, Birmingham to live with his mother's family.

After an education at Quaker schools including Ackworth School and Bootham School in York, Southall returned to Birmingham in 1878 and was articled as a trainee with the leading local architects' practice Martin & Chamberlain, while studying painting part-time at the Birmingham School of Art. Both institutions were steeped in the spirit of John Ruskin and the Arts and Crafts movement: architect John Henry Chamberlain was a founder and trustee of the Guild of St George, while the Principal of the School of Art, Edward R. Taylor, was a pioneer of Arts and Crafts education and a friend of William Morris and Edward Burne-Jones.

Southall however was frustrated by his architectural training, feeling that an architect should have a broader understanding of craft disciplines such as painting and carving. With this in mind he undertook several tours in Europe. In 1882 he visited Bayeux, Rouen and Amiens in Northern France. The following year, having left Martin & Chamberlain, he spent thirteen weeks in Italy, visiting Pisa, Florence, Siena, Orvieto, Rome, Bologna, Padua, Venice and Milan.

Italy was to have a profound impact. The frescoes of Benozzo Gozzoli were to inspire a deep admiration for the painters of the Italian Renaissance who - before the practice of oil painting spread to Italy from Northern Europe in the sixteenth century - worked largely in egg-based tempera. Forty years later Southall recalled:

the thrill of joy which I experienced when, without any knowledge of what I was about to see, I stepped inside the enchanting cloisters of the great Campo Santo of Pisa. There I found myself at 21 years of age face to face with a vast series of frescoes, so quiet and yet so gay, so reticent in manner and so lively in essence that words must ever fail to convey even the faintest expression of what I felt.

Southall's decisive moment came while viewing Two Venetian Ladies by Vittore Carpaccio in the Museo Correr in Venice. Ruskin's discussion of the painting in St Marks' Rest—the volume that Southall was using as a guide—included Ruskin's remark that "I must note in passing that many of the qualities which I have been in the habit of praising in Tintoret and Carpaccio, as consummate achievements in oil-painting are, as I have found lately, either in tempera altogether or tempera with oil above. And I am disposed to think that ultimately tempera will be found the proper material for the greater number of most delightful subjects." On his return to Birmingham Southall conducted his first experiments in tempera painting at the School of Art.

=== Hiatus ===
Initially, however, Southall's discovery of Italian tempera painting had less effect than his studies of Italian architecture. Southall's uncle George Baker - a friend of John Ruskin and Master of Ruskin's Guild of St George - passed some of Southall's Italian sketches on to Ruskin himself, who remarked that "he had never seen architecture better drawn".

Ruskin was so impressed by Southall's architectural understanding that in 1885 he gave him his first major commission: to design a museum for the Guild of St George to stand on his uncle's land near Bewdley, Worcestershire. Southall made a second trip to Italy in 1886 to research this commission, but the project was abandoned when Ruskin revived his original plans to build a museum in Sheffield. Southall later recalled "my chance as an architect vanished and years of obscurity with not a little bitterness of soul followed".

=== Tempera revival ===
Beauty Seeing the Image of her Home in the Fountain (1898), tempera on wood panel

Southall's experiments with tempera were also taxing throughout the late 1880s, and for a while he returned to oils. A third visit to Italy in 1890 re ignited his enthusiasm, however, and from 1893 his increasingly successful works in tempera received the wholehearted support of Edward Burne-Jones, who expressed particular admiration for Beauty Seeing the Image of her Home in the Fountain and personally submitted Southall's work for exhibition alongside his own.

By the late 1890s, Southall's experiments had established a method of painting that, while not identical to those documented by Italian sources such as Cennino Cennini, was practical, viable and a genuine tempera method. Although he was not the first Victorian artist to experiment with tempera (John Roddam Spencer Stanhope had exhibited a tempera painting in 1880) he was acknowledged as one of the leaders of its revival, exhibiting with the Arts and Crafts Exhibition Society, the Royal Academy and the Paris Salon. In 1901 he was prominent among the artists who exhibited at the Modern Paintings in Tempera exhibition at Leighton House Museum and six months later was one of the founder members of the Society of Painters in Tempera, writing the first of the society's technical papers on Grounds suitable for painting in Tempera.

Although Southall was never on the staff of the Birmingham School of Art, he maintained close friendships with the core of staff and pupils at the school who would later be identified as the Birmingham Group of Artist-Craftsmen - introducing artists such as Henry Payne, Maxwell Armfield and Arthur Gaskin (a lifelong friend) to his methods during technical demonstrations at his studio in Edgbaston.

=== Edwardian heyday ===
Contentment (1928), watercolor on vellum nailed to a linen-covered stretcher

The years before the outbreak of World War I saw Southall at the height of his achievement and fame. He worked on a series of large tempera paintings on mythological subjects that were widely exhibited across Europe and the United States. These could take up to two years to complete but were to establish his reputation critically.

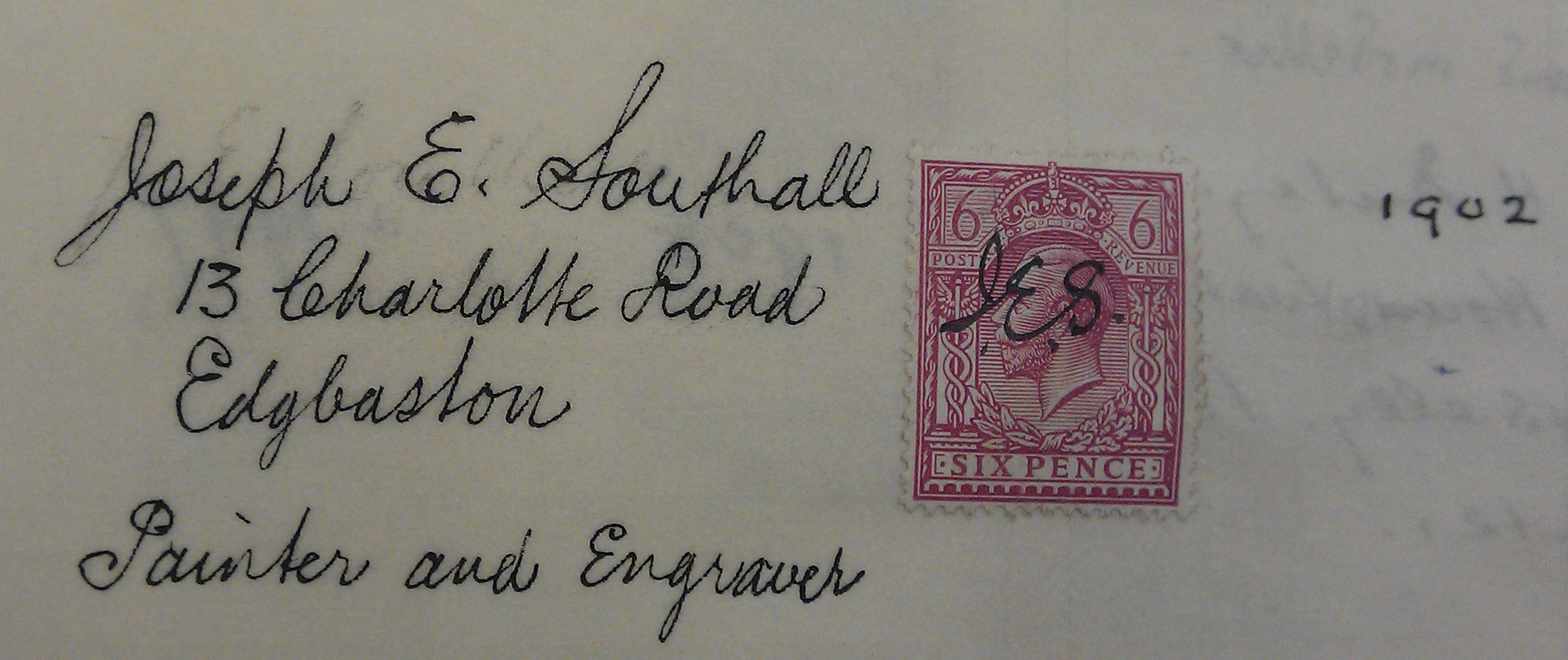
Southall's entry in the Royal Birmingham Society of Artists members' register; in his own hand. Dated 1902, with an initialled postage stamp.

He was elected an Associate of the Royal Birmingham Society of Artists in 1898 and a full Member in 1902, a member of the Arts and Crafts Exhibition Society in 1903 and of the Art Workers Guild and Union Internationale des Beaux-Arts et des Lettres in 1910. In 1907, he was prominent in the first exhibition dedicated to the work of the Birmingham Group held at the Fine Art Society in London, and in 1910 he was the subject of a one-man exhibition at the Galerie Georges Petit in Paris, which was both a critical and a commercial triumph.

In 1903, Southall married Anna Elizabeth Baker. The couple had been close companions since their youth and had always intended to marry, but were cousins and had deliberately put off marriage until she was after child-bearing age.

=== World War I and after ===
Southall's output as a painter declined considerably with the outbreak of World War I, as the pacifism inherent in his Quaker faith led him to devote his energies to anti-war campaigning. His main artistic output during this period were anti-war cartoons printed in pamphlets and magazines, which number among his most powerful works.

Post-war, with his reputation well established, Southall produced fewer of the epic (and time-consuming) tempera works that made his critical name. Much of his life involved travel: favourite destinations included France, Italy, Fowey in Cornwall and Southwold in Suffolk, and these trips generally resulted in series of landscapes, often in watercolour. Between trips his time was spent painting portraits for wealthy, often Quaker, patrons. He was elected a member of the Royal Watercolour Society and the New English Art Club in 1925, and in 1939 was elected President of the Royal Birmingham Society of Artists - a post he held until his death.

In 1937, Southall underwent an operation from which he never really recovered. After several years of ill health, during which he doggedly continued to paint, he died of heart failure at his home in Edgbaston in 1944.

== Work ==
Hortus Inclusus (1898), watercolor on vellum

Southall painted a variety of subjects during his career, including mythological, romantic, and religious subjects, portraits and landscapes. He was known for his mastery of the colour red, the clean and clear light in his works, and for his paintings on the theme of Beauty and the Beast.

Southall's choice of medium was heavily informed by his Arts and Crafts belief that the physical act of creation was as important as the act of design. Aesthetically egg tempera provided the luminescence and jewel-like quality that had been so sought after by the Pre-Raphaelites (who never themselves perfected the technique), but it also gave him the opportunity to fashion his own materials by hand. To obtain the egg yolks required he even kept his own chickens.

Although Southall also painted in a variety of other laborious media (such as the watercolour on vellum of his work Hortus Inclusus), lack of patronage limited his work in fresco - the medium he personally found most interesting. His best known fresco Corporation Street Birmingham in March 1914 - painted for Birmingham Museum & Art Gallery - was described by William Rothenstein as "perhaps the most perfect painted in the last three centuries".

In common with other Birmingham Group members Southall also practiced a variety of crafts besides painting, including murals, furniture decoration, lacework, book illustration and engravings. Many of his paintings have frames featuring decorative work by his wife or other Birmingham Group figures such as Georgie Gaskin or Charles Gere - such decoration was considered integral to the work of art.

=== Influence and reputation ===
As with many Victorian artists, Southall's critical reputation declined through the twentieth century, as he was seen as a backward-looking English artist rendered anachronistic by the rising tide of French modernism. Roger Fry described him as "a little slightly disgruntled and dyspeptic Quaker artist who does incredible tempera sham Quattrocentro modern sentimental things with a terrible kind of meticulous skill".

With the renewed interest in Victorian art this began to be seen as a misrepresentation. John Russell Taylor, art critic of The Times, described him in 1980 as "a natural-born surrealist"; writing that "there is undoubtedly an authentic strangeness in the way he saw things, which comes out most powerfully in his tempera paintings of contemporary life, but also casts a weird light over many of his watercolours ... we are much more likely to find ourselves thinking of Magritte and Balthus and Chirico than of anyone nearer to this apparently stick-in-the-mud Arts-and-Craftsman." Pablo Picasso is recorded by Osbert Sitwell as being so impressed by a Southall painting when visiting Violet Gordon-Woodhouse in the 1920s that he tried to buy it on the spot for his private collection.

Far from being isolated from developments on the continent, Southall's reputation was if anything higher in France than in England, with exhibitions at the Salon de Champs-Élysées and the Salon de Champs-de-Mars from the 1890s onwards, and membership of the Union Internationale des Beaux-Arts et des Lettres in 1910 and the Société Nationale des Beaux-Arts in 1925. His most successful exhibition was that at the Galerie Georges Petit in Paris - one of the main centres of progressive French art.

== Political activism ==
Southall's interest in radical politics may have been awakened by his uncle George Baker, whose family had a history of radicalism going back to the seventeenth century. Southall's 1885 sketch of John Bright addressing a Birmingham political meeting might be taken as an early indication of radical interest.

Southall politics were strongly influenced by the pacifism of his Quaker faith. His opposition to the tide of jingoism that surrounded the Jameson Raid in 1895 provoked him into political action, and the outbreak of World War I in 1914 caused him to switch his allegiance from the Liberal Party to the anti-war Independent Labour Party, for whose Birmingham branch he served as secretary from 1914 until 1931.

Southall's obituary in the Birmingham Post recorded that he was always "an enthusiastic supporter of that Socialism or Communism which William Morris expressed in his News from Nowhere".
