= Diana Armfield =

British artist (born 1920)

Diana Armfield RA RWA MSIA
- Born: Diana Maxwell Armfield; 11 June 1920 (age 105); Ringwood, Hampshire, England
- Education: Bedales; Slade School of Fine Art; Central School of Art and Design
- Occupation: Artist
- Known for: Painting; designing; teaching
- Spouse: Bernard Dunstan (m. 1949; died 2017)
- Children: 3
- Relatives: Maxwell Armfield (uncle)

Diana Maxwell Armfield (born 11 June 1920) is a British artist. She is known for landscapes, and has also painted portraits, literary subjects, and still lifes. She has a particular interest in flower paintings, and is considered to owe much to the Sickert tradition. She studied at the Slade School of Fine Art and the Central School of Arts and Crafts. Armfield was elected as a Royal Academician in 1991.

== Early life and education ==
Diana Maxwell Armfield was born on 11 June 1920 in Ringwood, Hampshire, England. She has a Quaker background. Her uncle, Maxwell Armfield, was an English artist, illustrator and writer.

She attended Bedales School, a co-educational independent school in the village of Steep in Hampshire, from which she graduated in 1937. She later studied at the Slade School of Fine Art and the Central School of Arts and Crafts.

== Career ==
Armfield has worked as a painter, designer and teacher. She started her career running the Armfield-Passano Partnership with Roy Passano. The Partnership existed from 1946 to 1952 and produced textiles and wallpapers. At the 1951 Festival of Britain Armfield-Passano lengths were displayed and examples of their designs are in the Victoria & Albert Museum collection. After travelling to the Soviet Union Armfield became inspired by Ukrainian folk design.

During World War II, Armfield organised cultural and entertainment events for soldiers and factory workers in YMCA hostels, started neighbourhood choirs and an amateur orchestra in London. From 1959 she taught at the Byam Shaw School of Art. She worked as a fabric and wallpaper designer until 1965. In 1985 she was appointed artist-in-residence in Perth, Australia. Following this appointment she was selected for an artist-in-residence post at Jackson, Wyoming in 1989. She was elected as Associate Member of the Royal Academy in 1989 and in 1991 became a full member.

Armfield has exhibited in London, and is particularly associated with the Browse & Darby Gallery. She had a solo show at the Tegfryn Art Gallery, Anglesey in 1975 and 1978. In 1988 she was featured in a combined retrospective with Bernard Dunstan at the Oriel 31 Gallery in Newtown and Welshpool. Armfield's work includes commissions from The National Trust in 1988 and from The Prince of Wales in 1989. Her work is held by The British Museum, the Contemporary Art Society for Wales and the Government Art Collection.

She is considered to owe much to the Sickert tradition.

== Recognition ==
Armfield is a member of the New English Art Club (elected in 1970), the Royal West of England Academy (elected in 1975), the Royal Watercolour Society (elected in 1980) and the Royal Cambrian Academy of Art. She was elected as a Royal Academician in 1991.

== Other activities ==
As of 2019 she was an editorial consultant for Leisure Painter magazine.

== Personal life ==
Armfield met her future husband Bernard Dunstan (1920–2017) while she was at the Slade School of Fine Art. They married in 1949 and have three sons.

As of 2021 she was living in Kew, south-west London. She also had a home in Wales as of 2015.

== Publications ==
Armfield has appeared in and has consulted on many publications, including:

- The New English by Kenneth McConkey, ISBN 1903973988
- Pocket Guide: Painting in Oils (Series Consultant) ISBN 0855333723
- Drawing, A Practical Step by Step Guide (Series Consultant) ISBN 0855335017
- The Art of Diana Armfield by Julian Halsby, ISBN 0715302337
