= Louis Walter Davies =

Australian physicist

Louis Walter Davies (1923-2001) was an Australian radiophysicist. He was an elected fellow of the Institution of Electrical and Electronic Engineers, the Institution of Engineers and the Australian Academy of Science. He was an appointed Officer of the Order of Australia.
