= Arthur Gaskin =

Arthur J. Gaskin
- Born: 16 March 1862; Lee Bank, Birmingham, England
- Died: 4 June 1928 (aged 66); Edgbaston, Birmingham, England
- Education: Birmingham School of Art
- Occupation: Artist
- Spouse: Georgie Gaskin (m. 1894)
- Children: 2

Arthur Joseph Gaskin RBSA (16 March 1862 – 4 June 1928) was an English illustrator, painter, teacher and designer of jewellery and enamelwork.

Gaskin and his wife Georgie Gaskin were members of the Birmingham Group of Artist-Craftsmen, which sought to apply the principles of the Arts and Crafts movement across the decorative arts. Like many of the group, Gaskin studied at the Birmingham School of Art under Edward R. Taylor and later taught there.

== Life ==
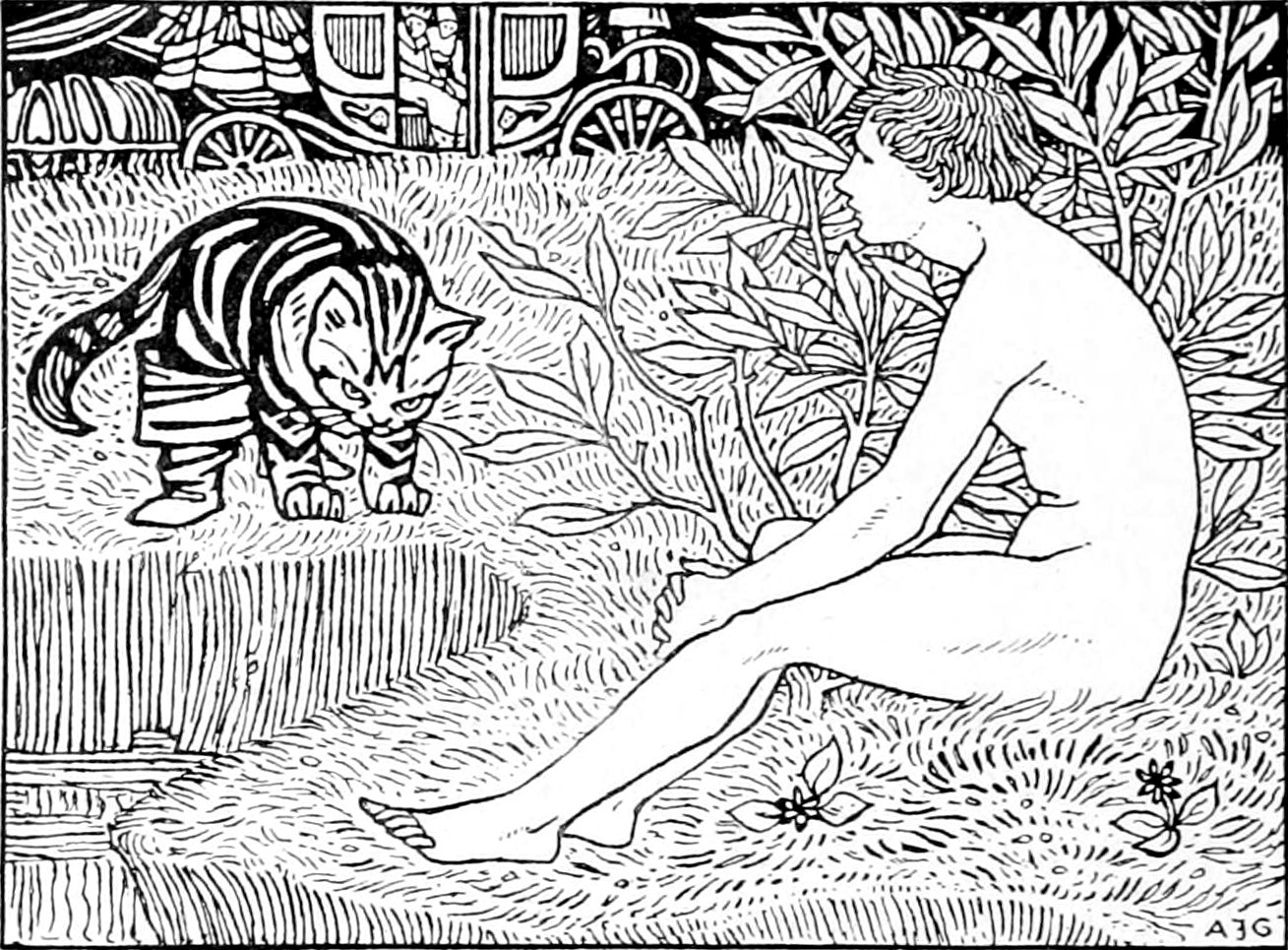
"Puss in boots" from A Book of Fairy Tales retold by S. Baring-Gould (Methuen, 1894)

Gaskin was born in the Lee Bank area of Birmingham in 1862, the son of a decorator. He was brought up in Wolverhampton where he attended Wolverhampton Grammar School before returning to Birmingham in 1879.

In 1883 Gaskin entered the Birmingham School of Art, being appointed to the teaching staff two years later despite not completing his course. It was here that he met Georgie Gaskin in 1888, one of his students, whom he married in 1894. Gaskin worked as a decorative artist from 1890, producing woodcut illustrations for William Morris's Kelmscott Press, and painted in tempera after receiving instruction from his friend Joseph Southall at Southall's studio in Edgbaston.

The Gaskins started producing jewellery from 1899 under the name "Mr & Mrs Arthur Gaskin", and in 1903 Arthur was appointed headmaster of the Vittoria Street School for Jewellers and Silversmiths, where he was to remain until 1924, when the couple retired to Chipping Campden in Gloucestershire, near the Guild and School of Handicraft established in that town as a community of artists and craftspeople by the arts and crafts architect Charles Robert Ashbee.

As a Member of the Royal Birmingham Society of Artists (RBSA), Gaskin was instrumental in organising the exhibition "The New Movement in Art" at the Society in 1917. This was a revised version of Roger Fry's Post-Impressionist exhibition held in 1910.
