= National Register of Historic Places listings in Jerauld County, South Dakota =

Location of Jerauld County in South Dakota

This is a list of the National Register of Historic Places listings in Jerauld County, South Dakota.

This is intended to be a complete list of the properties on the National Register of Historic Places in Jerauld County, South Dakota, United States. The locations of National Register properties for which the latitude and longitude coordinates are included below, may be seen in a map.

There are 15 properties listed on the National Register in the county.

This National Park Service list is complete through NPS recent listings posted December 12, 2025.

== Current listings ==
	Name on the Register	Image	Date listed	Location	City or town	Description
1	Alpena Bathhouse and Swimming Pool	Alpena Bathhouse and Swimming Pool	June 22, 2000 (#00000727)	417 Main St. 44°10′51″N 98°22′14″W	Alpena	
2	Archeological Site 39JE10		February 23, 1984 (#84003336)	Address restricted	Wessington Springs	
3	Archeological Site 39JE11		February 23, 1984 (#84003337)	Address restricted	Gann Valley	
4	Harmony Friends Church	Harmony Friends Church	September 1, 2015 (#15000565)	225th St. & 372nd Ave. 44°07′25″N 98°45′06″W	Wessington Springs vicinity	
5	Hawkeye Valley Mill	Hawkeye Valley Mill	January 23, 2013 (#12001216)	Southeastern ¼ of Section 23, Township 106 North, Range 65 West; 43°58′19″N 98°35′30″W	Wessington Springs	
6	Jerauld County Courthouse	Jerauld County Courthouse	February 10, 1993 (#92001860)	205 S. Wallace; 44°04′42″N 98°34′12″W	Wessington Springs	
7	Methodist Episcopal Church of Wessington Springs	Methodist Episcopal Church of Wessington Springs	December 17, 1999 (#99001582)	Southeastern corner of Main and State Sts. 44°04′47″N 98°34′19″W	Wessington Springs	
8	Municipal Field House	Municipal Field House	June 2, 2000 (#00000600)	418 2nd St., SW. 44°04′37″N 98°34′22″W	Wessington Springs	
9	L.P. Nielson Barn	L.P. Nielson Barn	December 15, 2004 (#04001363)	23251 393rd Ave. 44°01′04″N 98°21′15″W	Woonsocket	
10	Shakespeare Garden and Shay House	Shakespeare Garden and Shay House	November 14, 1979 (#79003681)	501 Alene Avenue N 44°05′03″N 98°34′32″W	Wessington Springs	
11	Robert S. Vessey House	Robert S. Vessey House	April 26, 1978 (#78002560)	109 N. College Ave. 44°04′49″N 98°34′27″W	Wessington Springs	
12	Wessington Springs Carnegie Library	Wessington Springs Carnegie Library	June 3, 1999 (#99000677)	109 W. Main Street; 44°04′45″N 98°34′20″W	Wessington Springs	
13	Wessington Springs Opera House	Wessington Springs Opera House	July 21, 1976 (#76001738)	111 Dakota Ave., N. 44°04′48″N 98°34′14″W	Wessington Springs	
14	H.P. Will House	H.P. Will House	February 5, 2003 (#02001763)	207 Alene Ave., N. 44°04′52″N 98°34′32″W	Wessington Springs	
15	Zion Emmanuel Lutheran Church		October 23, 2023 (#100009483)	320 Oak Ave. 44°04′10″N 98°25′36″W	Lane	

== See also ==
- List of National Historic Landmarks in South Dakota
- National Register of Historic Places listings in South Dakota
