= Lane (given name) =

Lane is a unisex given name. It may refer to:

== Men ==
- Lane Adams (born 1989), American baseball player
- Lane K. Akiona, Hawaiian Roman Catholic priest
- Lane Beattie (born 1951), American businessman and politician
- Lane Bradford (1922–1973), American actor
- Lane Burroughs, American basketball player and coach
- Lane Carlson (born 1978), American model
- Lane Carson (born 1947), American politician
- Lane Chandler (1899–1972), American actor
- Lane Davies (born 1950), American actor
- Lane Dwinell (1906–1997), American politician
- Lane Evans (1951–2014), American politician
- Lane Fenner (born 1945), American football player
- Lane Frost (1963–1989), American bull rider
- Lane Garrison (born 1980), American actor
- Lane P. Hughston (born 1951), American mathematician
- Lane Hutson (born 2004), American ice hockey player
- Lane Janger (born 1966), American film producer
- Lane Johnson (born 1990), American football player
- Lane Kenworthy, American sociologist
- Lane Kiffin (born 1975), American football coach
- Lane Kirkland (1922–1999), American labor union leader
- Lane Lambert (born 1964), Canadian ice hockey player
- Lane Lord (born 1971), American women's basketball coach
- Lane MacDermid (born 1989), American ice hockey player
- Lane MacDonald (born 1966), American ice hockey player
- Lane McCotter, American prison administrator
- Lane McCray (born 1960), American singer and musician
- Lane Napper (born 1967), American actor and dancer
- Lane Nishikawa, American actor, playwright and performance artist
- Lane Penn, New Zealand rugby union player, coach and administrator
- Lane Roberts, American politician
- Lane Rogers (1994–2025), American pornographic actor
- Lane Shetterly, American politician and lawyer
- Lane Smith (1936–2005), American actor
- Lane Smith (illustrator) (born 1959), American children's illustrator and author
- Lane Taylor (born 1989), American football player
- Lane Thomas (born 1995), American baseball player
- Lane Tietgen, American poet and musician
- Lane Toran (born 1982), American actor and musician
- Lane Turner (born 1967), American country singer-songwriter

== Women ==
- Lane Bradbury (born 1938), American actress and writer
- Lane Brody (born 1955), American singer-songwriter
- Lane DeGregory, American journalist
- Lane Lindell (born 1990), American model
- Lane I. McClelland (born 1949), United States Coast Guard captain and military lawyer
- Lane Moore, American comedian, actress, writer and musician
- Lane Murdock (born 2002), American youth activist
- Lane Murray (1921–2009), American educator
- Lane Shi Otayonii (born 1993/1994), Chinese musician
- Lane Tanner, American winemaker and consultant
- Lane Windham, American historian

== Fictional characters ==
- Lane McEvoy, the main character in the Fetch series by Kat Falls. The Fetch series contains 2 books, Inhuman, and Undaunted.
- Lane, a character in the 1934 film The Man Who Changed His Name
- Lane Alexander, in Victorious
- Lane Kim, in Gilmore Girls
- Lane Meyer, in Better Off Dead
- Lane Pryce, in Mad Men

== See also ==
- Lane (surname)
- Lane (disambiguation)
- Layne
- Laine (disambiguation)
