= Laning (disambiguation) =

Laning is a commune in the Moselle department in Lorraine in north-eastern France.

Laning may also refer to:

- Laning (surname), a surname
- USS Laning (DE-159), a Buckley-class destroyer escort

== See also ==
- Lane (disambiguation)
- Laner
- Lanes (disambiguation)
