= Lane (disambiguation) =

A vehicle lane is a part of a road designated for use by a single line of traffic.

Lane may also refer to:

== Roadways ==
- Country lane
- Back lane

== Places ==
=== United Kingdom ===
- Lane, Cornwall
- Lane, West Yorkshire
- The Lanes, an area of narrow streets and alleyways in Brighton

=== United States ===
- Lane, Idaho
- Lane, Illinois
- Lane, Kansas
- Lane, Nebraska
- Lane, Oklahoma
- Lane, South Carolina
- Lane, South Dakota
- Lane City, Texas
- Lane County, Kansas
- Lane County, Oregon

=== Other countries ===
- Lanë, a stream in Tirana, Albania
- Lane, Belgium, Dutch name of the municipality of Lasne

=== Elsewhere ===
- Lane (crater), an impact crater on the far side of the Moon

== People and fictional characters ==
- Lane (surname)
- Lane (given name)

== Schools in the United States ==
- Lane College, Jackson, Tennessee, a private historically black college
- Lane Community College, Eugene, Oregon, a public community college
- Lane Seminary, Walnut Hills, Ohio, a former Presbyterian theological college
- Franklin K. Lane High School, New York City, New York, a former public high school
- Lane High School, Charlottesville, Virginia, a former public secondary school
- Lane Tech College Prep High School, Chicago, Illinois, a public 4-year selective high school

== Sports ==
- Lane or alley, in the game of bowling
- Lane or key, also known as the free throw lane, on a basketball court

== Other uses ==
- Lane (hash function), a cryptographic hash function
- Hurricane Lane, several storms
- Lane cake, also known as prize cake or Alabama Lane cake, a bourbon-laced baked cake
- Lane, a single serial communication connection within a computer interface link (e.g., Ethernet, PCI Express)
- "The Lane", a 1996 single by Ice-T
- The Lane Hotel, a historic building in Mathews, Virginia, US
- "Lane" (Our Girl), a 2016 television episode
- One of three paths (top, bottom, and middle) in many Multiplayer Online Battle Arena video games
- "Lane", a song by Sampa the Great from As Above, So Below, 2022
- Parramatta Lanes, a street festival in Parramatta, New South Wales, Australia

== See also ==
- Lain (disambiguation)
- Laine (disambiguation)
- Layne, a surname and given name
