= Kalmer =

Male given name and family name

Kalmer may be a male given name or a family name. People:

Given name

- Kalmer Lain (born 1968), Estonian politician
- Kalmer Tennosaar (1928–2004), Estonian singer, television presenter and journalist

Surname

- Dewey Kalmer, American college baseball coach
- Joseph Kalmer (1898–1959), Austrian writer
- René Kalmer (born 1980), South African runner
