= Lanes (disambiguation) =

Lanes are narrow roads.

Lanes may also refer to:

- Willian Lanes de Lima (born 1985), Brazilian footballer

== See also ==
- Lane (disambiguation)
- Laner
- Laning (disambiguation)
- The Lanes
