= Lain =

Lain may refer to:

== Places ==
- Lain, Guinea, a town and sub-prefecture in the Nzérékoré Region
- Lain, Iran, a village in Kurdistan Province
- Lain, Yonne, a commune in the Yonne département, France

== People ==
=== Given name ===
- Lain (singer), English singer
- Lain Maw Thee (born 1989), Burmese singer and songwriter
- Lain Singh Bangdel (1919–2002), Nepalese artist, historian, and novelist
- Latuinus (died c. AD 440), also known as Lain, Gallo-Roman bishop and saint

=== Middle name ===
- Pedro Laín Entralgo (1908–2001) Spanish historian, philosopher, physician, and writer

=== Surname ===
- Chasey Lain (born 1971), American actress
- Chip Lain (born 1958), American stock car racing driver
- Douglas Lain (born 1970), American novelist
- Evelina De Lain (born 1977) English pianist
- Jean-Pierre Le Lain (born 1961), French rower
- Jean Thomas Dulaien (1727–1728), also known as Jean Thomas du Lain, French pirate
- Kalmer Lain (born 1968), Estonian politician
- Kellan Lain (born 1989), Canadian ice hockey player
- Rosemary Lain-Priestley (born 1967), Anglican priestess
- T. H. Lain, American pseudonymous novelist
- Zinedine Hameur-Lain (born 1986), French-Algerian kickboxer

=== Fictional ===
- Lain Iwakura, the titular character of the anime television series Serial Experiments Lain

== Other uses ==
- Laining, a synonym for Torah reading
- Obrascón Huarte Lain, a Spanish construction and civil engineering company
