= Switch Lanes =

Switch Lanes or Switch lanes may refer to:

- "Switch Lanes (song)", a song by rapper Tyga from the 2013 album Hotel California
- "Switch Lanes", a single by hip hop artist Ritz from the 2013 album The Life and Times of Jonny Valiant
- Local–express lanes or collector–distributor lanes, an arrangement of carriageways on a major highway to segregate merging and diverging traffic from through traffic.
- Reversible lanes, or tidal flow lanes, used to allow travel in different directions depending on the circumstances
- Passing lanes or overtaking lanes, for use by motorists for overtaking

== See also ==
- Contraflow lane, a lane running in the opposite direction to surrounding lanes
  - Contraflow lane reversal, temporary contraflow lanes for e.g. emergency evacuation or maintenance
- "Laneswitch (song)", single from rapper Lil Tjay's debut album True 2 Myself
- Splitting lanes, riding a bicycle or motorcycle between lanes
- Lane (disambiguation)
