= Shakespeare Garden and Anne Hathaway Cottage =

- Shakespeare Garden and Shay House
- U.S. National Register of Historic Places
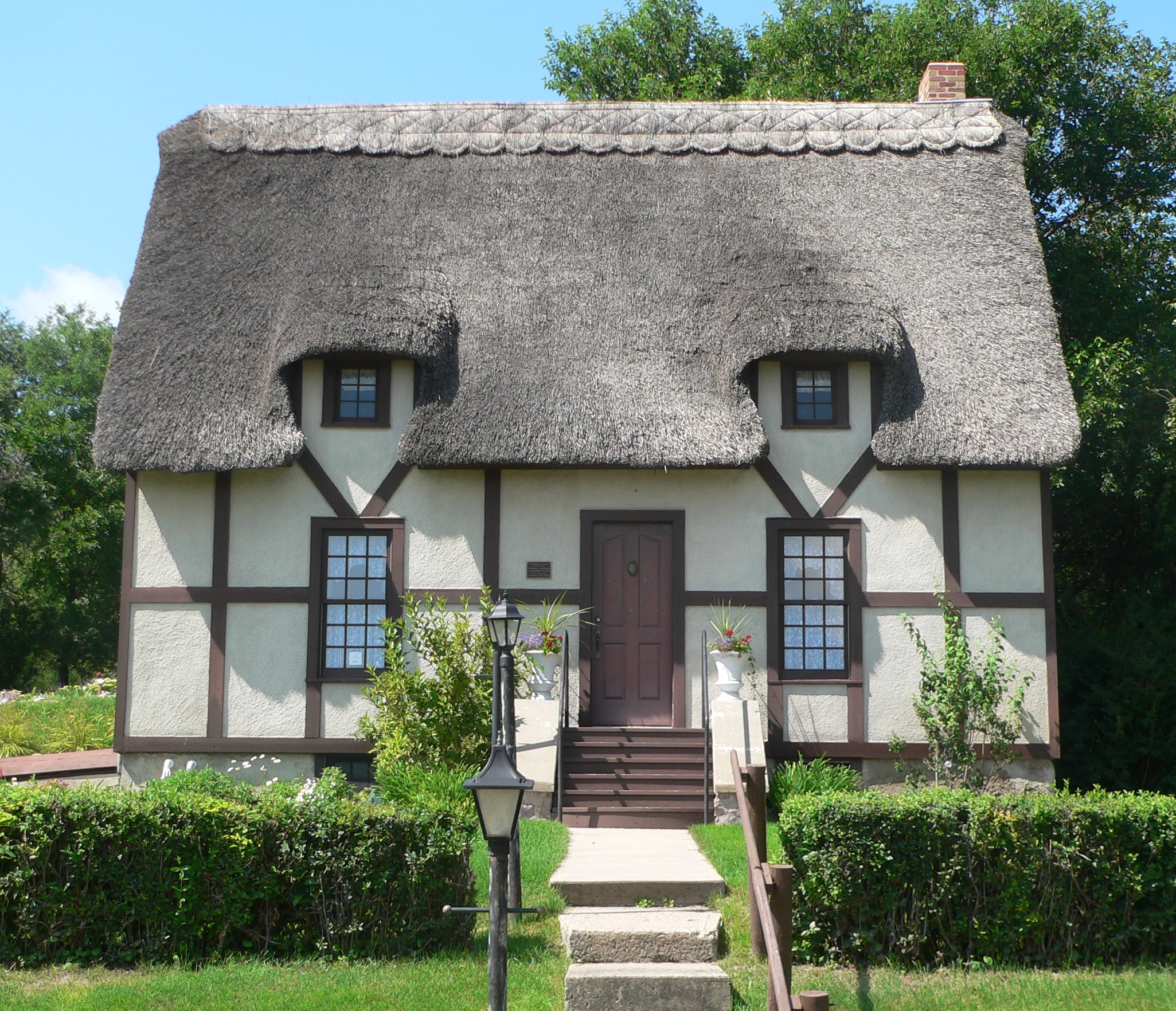

- Location within South Dakota Location within the United States
- Location: 501 Alene Ave. N., Wessington Springs, South Dakota
- Coordinates: 44°05′03″N 98°34′32″W
- Area: 2 acres (0.81 ha)
- Built: 1927
- Architectural style: Tudor Revival
- NRHP reference No.: 79003681
- Added to NRHP: November 14, 1979

The Shakespeare Garden and Anne Hathaway Cottage is a recreation of Anne Hathaway's Cottage in Wessington Springs, South Dakota, United States. Inspired by the original cottage during a vacation to England, Emma Shay completed the house and adjoining Shakespeare garden in 1932 and 1927, respectively. It currently serves as a public tourist attraction and an event venue.

In 1979, it was listed on the National Register of Historic Places as the Shakespeare Garden and Shay House for its unique architecture. It is one of the few examples of a 20th-century formal garden in South Dakota.

== History ==
Emma Abigail Freeland was born in New York in 1868. In 1895, she married Clark Shay, and both became instructors at Wessington Springs College. An avid reader of William Shakespeare, Emma travelled to England in 1926 to tour gardens planted by the National Shakespeare Association.

Shay recruited her English class to plant the Shakespeare garden during the spring of 1927. At the time of completion, it was the first Shakespeare garden in South Dakota. Some of the first plants were grown from seeds Shay had obtained in England.

For the Shays' retirement home, Emma took inspiration from Anne Hathaway's cottage at Shottery, Stratford-upon-Avon. The house was finished in 1932.

Emma Shay died in 1945 and Clark Shay died in 1951. The grounds were maintained by the English Department at Wessington Springs College until it closed in 1964, after which time caretaking fell to a private organization. As the rest of the college was demolished for a new development in 1970, the Shay property is the only remaining structure from the college. By 1979, the property was in need of repairs and the garden was suffering from severe drought.

The garden and cottage were listed together on the National Register of Historic Places in 1979. In 1989, a group of Wessington Springs residents formed the Shakespeare Garden Society to buy and restore the grounds in the hopes that it would attract tourists. As part of the works, the society had the asphalt shingle roof thatched, as was the Shays' original plan. 1,400 bales of reed were used to thatch the roof at a total cost of $15,000. The thatcher, Cecil White, travelled to England for two weeks to attend a school on roof thatching. The east-facing windows were also rounded at this time.

A plaque honoring the Shays was installed in the garden in 2009, alongside a new hybrid daylily grown specifically for the occasion. Today, the grounds serve as an event venue and local tourist attraction. Shakespearean plays are performed during the summer and English tea sessions are available for public booking.

== Architecture ==
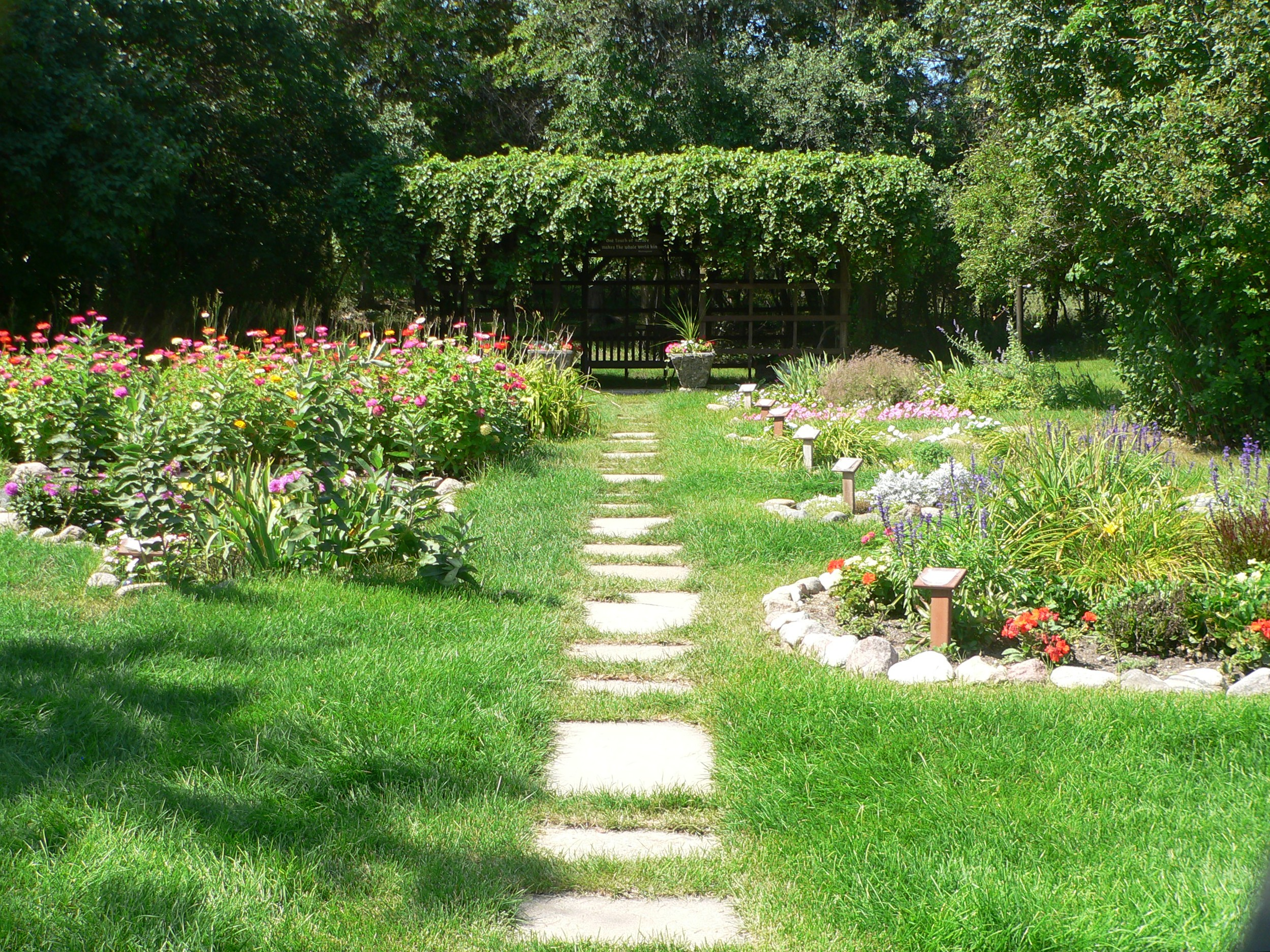
Shakespeare Garden

The 2-acre (0.81 ha) property is located on Alene Avenue North on the west side of Wessington Springs, South Dakota. The grounds sit on a small incline that rises into a small hill in the west.

=== Cottage ===
The Shay House was constructed as a replica of Anne Hathaway's 16th-century cottage in Shottery, Stratford-upon-Avon, England, and as such was built in the Tudor Revival style. It is a two-story, thatched-roof cottage, with a stucco exterior. Its main entrance faces the street on the east. One brick chimney sits against the building's north wall. Strapwork and nine double-hung sash windows run around the building. The roof is a steep-pitched gable with two shed wall dormer windows on the east side. Originally, the building had asphalt shingles, but the roof was thatched during renovations in the 1990s and 2000s. As of 2025, it is the only thatched-roof building in South Dakota. On the west side is a small clapboard addition, although the date of its construction is uncertain.

=== Garden ===
The Shakespeare Garden is a rare example of a 20th-century formal garden in South Dakota, although it does contain informal elements. It sits on the north side of the cottage and measures 100 by 150 feet (30 m × 46 m). It contains over 150 types of plants mentioned in Shakespeare's works, as well as other vegetation common in 16th-century England. Flowering plants include lilacs, geraniums, daisies, lilies, and tulips. A picket fence wraps around the street-facing side of the garden.

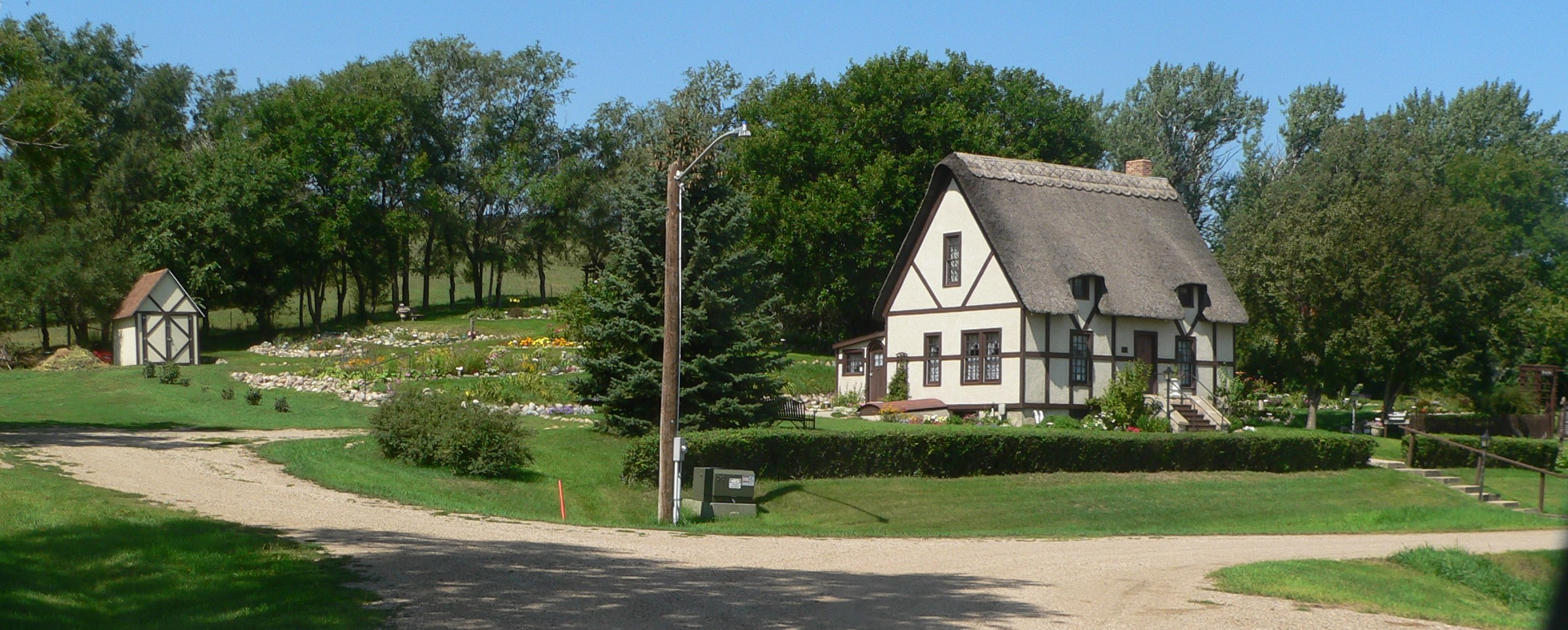
Panorama of the house and gardens

== See also ==
- National Register of Historic Places listings in Jerauld County, South Dakota
