= Dalfen =

Dalfen is a surname. Notable people with the surname include:

- Charles Dalfen (1943–2009), Canadian chairperson of the Canadian Radio-television and Telecommunications Commission (CRTC)
- Joachim Dalfen (1936–2017), Austrian classical philologist
- Layne Dalfen (born 1952), Canadian dream analyst, columnist, educator, and author
