= Layne =

Layne is both a surname and a given name. Notable people with the name include:

Surname:

- Alfredo Layne (1959–1999), Panamanian boxer
- Aubrey Layne (born 1956), American businessman and politician
- Barry Layne (born 1965), American racing driver
- Bobby Layne (1926–1986), American football player
- Christopher Layne (born 1949), American political scientist and academic
- Chyna Layne, American actress
- Cynthia Layne (1963–2015), American singer
- David Layne (born 1939), English footballer
- Dawn-Marie Layne (born 1988), Barbadian cricketer
- Floyd Layne (1929–2024), American basketball player and coach
- George Layne (born 1978), American football player
- Griffin Layne, American singer-songwriter
- Herman Layne (1901–1973), American baseball player
- Hillis Layne (1918–2010), American baseball player
- Isaac Layne (born 1995), English footballer
- Jerry Layne (born 1958), American baseball umpire
- Jerry Layne (ventriloquist) (1938–2018), American ventriloquist
- Jevontae Layne (born 2001), Canadian soccer player
- Johann Layne (born 2003), Barbadian cricketer
- Joy Layne (born 1941), American singer
- Justin Layne (born 1998), American football player
- Linda L. Layne (born 1955), American anthropologist and academic
- Kelly Layne (born 1975), Australian equestrian
- Ken Layne (born 1967), American writer, publisher and broadcaster
- Kenny Layne (born 1981), American professional wrestler
- Kevin Layne (born 1998), Guyanese footballer
- KiKi Layne (born 1991), American actress
- Lancelot Layne (died 1990), Trinidadian rapper
- Marcia Layne, British playwright
- Meade Layne (1882–1961), American ufologist
- Natalie Layne, American musician
- Oliver Layne (1876–1932), West Indian cricketer
- Oscar Willis Layne (1918–2016), Panamanian cyclist
- Patti Layne (born 1956), Canadian singer-songwriter
- Raheem Layne (born 1999), American football player
- Rex Layne (1928–2000), American boxer
- Ryan Layne (born 1982), Barbadian cricketer
- Shontelle Layne (born 1985), Barbadian singer
- Tamrat Layne (born 1995), Ethiopian politician
- Tommy Layne (born 1984), American baseball player

Given name:

- Layne Abeley, character from Canadian young adult novel series The Clique
- Layne Beachley (born 1972), Australian surfer
- Layne Beaubien (born 1976), American water polo player
- Layne Britton (1907–1993), American makeup artist and actor
- Layne Coleman, Canadian actor, playwright and theatre director
- Layne Dalfen (born 1952), Canadian psychologist, writer and academic
- Layne Flack (1969–2021), American poker player
- Layne Hatcher (born 1999), American football player
- Layne McDowell (born 1949), American football player
- Layne Morgan (born 1999), Australian rugby player
- Layne Morris (born 1962), American soldier
- Layne Redman, British television presenter, writer and actor
- Layne Redmond (1952–2013), American drummer, writer and teacher
- Layne Riggs (born 2002), American racing driver
- Layne Sleeth (born 2001), Canadian tennis player
- Layne Somsen (born 1989), American baseball player
- Layne Staley (1967–2002), American musician
- Layne Tom Jr. (1927–2015), American actor
- Layne Ulmer (born 1980), Canadian ice hockey player
- Layne Van Buskirk (born 1998), Canadian volleyball player

== See also ==
- "Arnold Layne", song by Pink Floyd
