= Saint Augustine by the Sea Catholic Church =

Parish of the Roman Catholic Church of Hawaiʻi in the United States

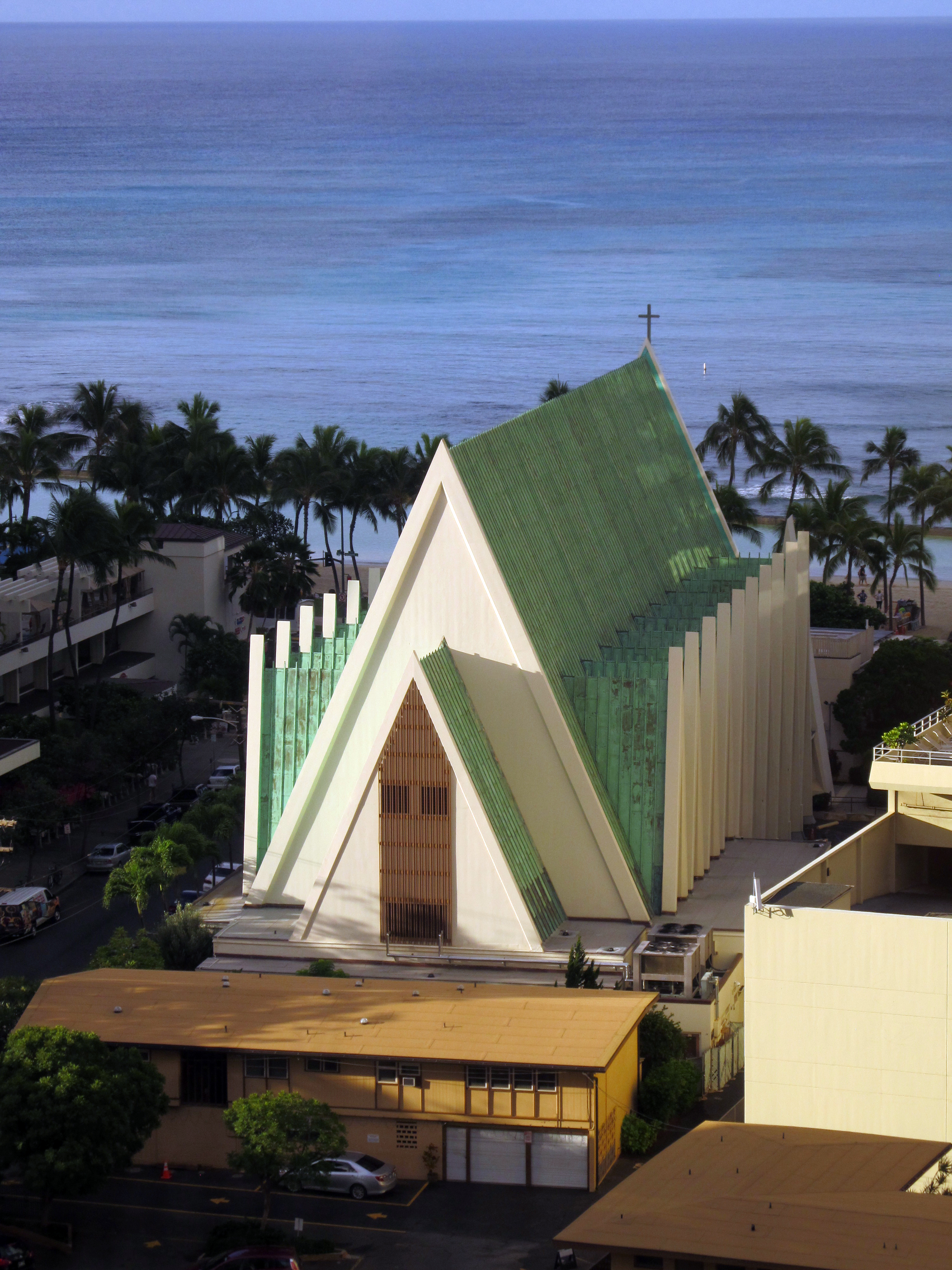

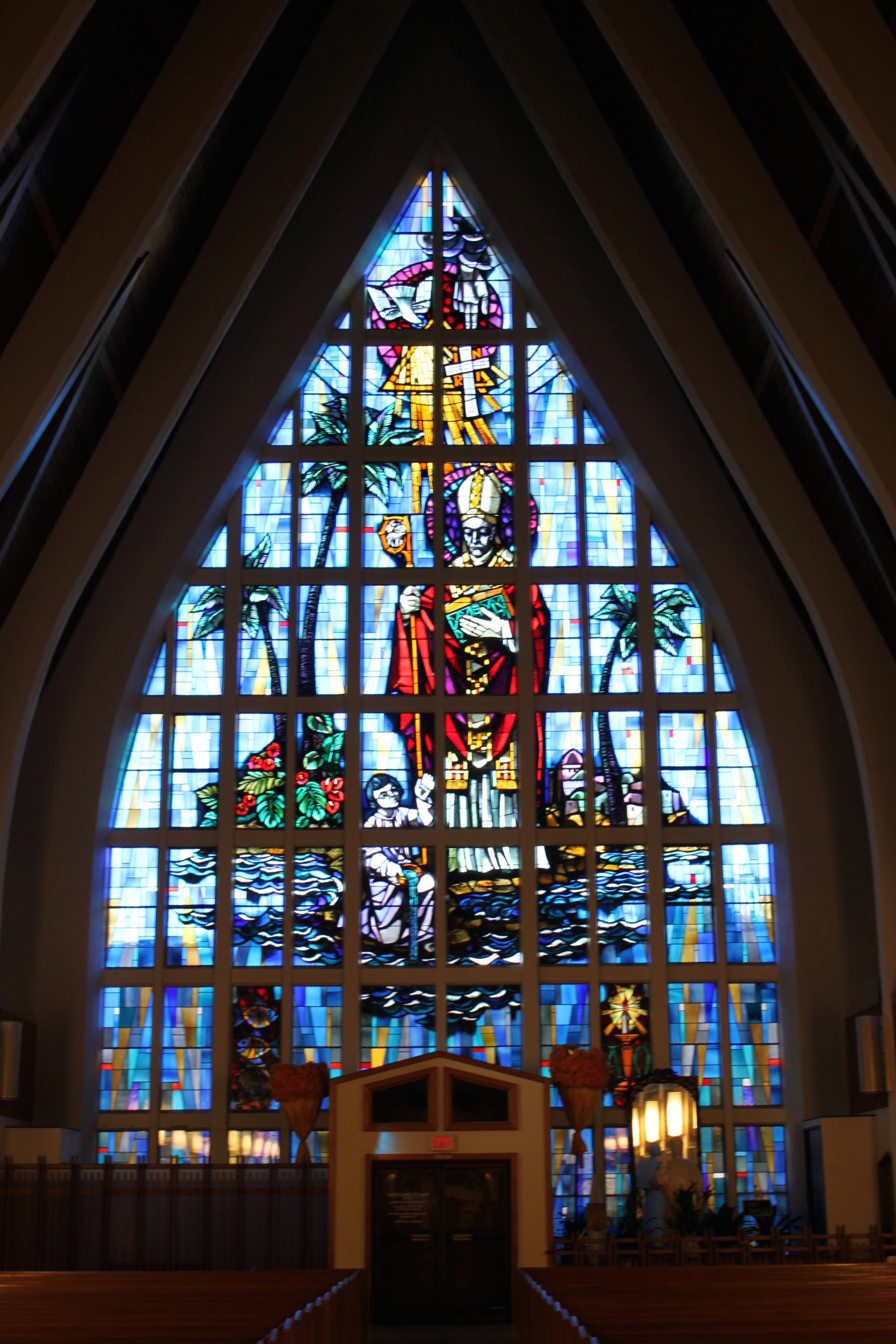

Saint Augustine by the Sea Catholic Church is a parish of the Roman Catholic Church of Hawaiʻi in the United States. It falls under the jurisdiction of the Diocese of Honolulu and its bishop; it is staffed by the Congregation of the Sacred Hearts of Jesus and Mary. Located at 130 Ohua Avenue, adjacent to Kalākaua Avenue in Waikiki, Saint Augustine by the Sea ministers primarily to visitors, as Waikiki contains the highest number of domestic and international visitors in the State of Hawai‘i.

The parish campus is the home of the Damien Museum which houses several relics of Saint Damien of Moloka‘i and related historical artifacts. A 20-minute video is shown about Father Damien and his work with Kalaupapa leprosy settlement. However, the museum is permanently closed now. Some of the displays have been removed, and the church still offers information about Father Damien’s life nearby.

The current clerics of the parish include Father Lane K. Akiona, SS.CC., pastor, and Father Lucius, SS.CC., parochial vicar.

== History ==
Father Modestus Favens, SS.CC., was said to have built the first chapel in Waikiki as early as 1854. The chapel was about twenty-feet by forty-feet with a steeple. Mass was seldom said in this chapel - the predominant weekly activity was Sunday afternoon devotions and religious instruction. In 1898, during the Spanish–American War, many American soldiers were encamped near Diamond Head. At their request, Msgr. Gulstan Ropert, SS.CC., authorized the first Mass for these soldiers in the chapel. The chapel was deemed much too small for continued military use and a temporary wooden frame structure was erected by the military authorities with a roof and open sides thatched with coconut palm fronds. Msgr. Ropert blessed the new structure and entrusted it to the care of Father Valentin Franckx, SS.CC. Father Franckx later made improvements to the chapel by putting in flooring, galvanized roofing and lattice walls. When the soldiers left, the community in Waikiki continued to frequent the chapel on Sundays when Father Valentin said Mass.

Ropert approved plans to build a more permanent church and in 1901, on the feast day of Saint Augustine, he dedicated the new church under the title of its festal namesake, as the carpenters took a break while the services were conducted. Waikiki was being touted as a tourist destination and the number of parishioners and visitors continued to grow. The church underwent enlargement in 1910, and 1925, essentially by cutting the building in two and moving the back to the beach. In 1920, the church acquired a right-of-way access to Kalākaua Avenue.

== Gallery ==
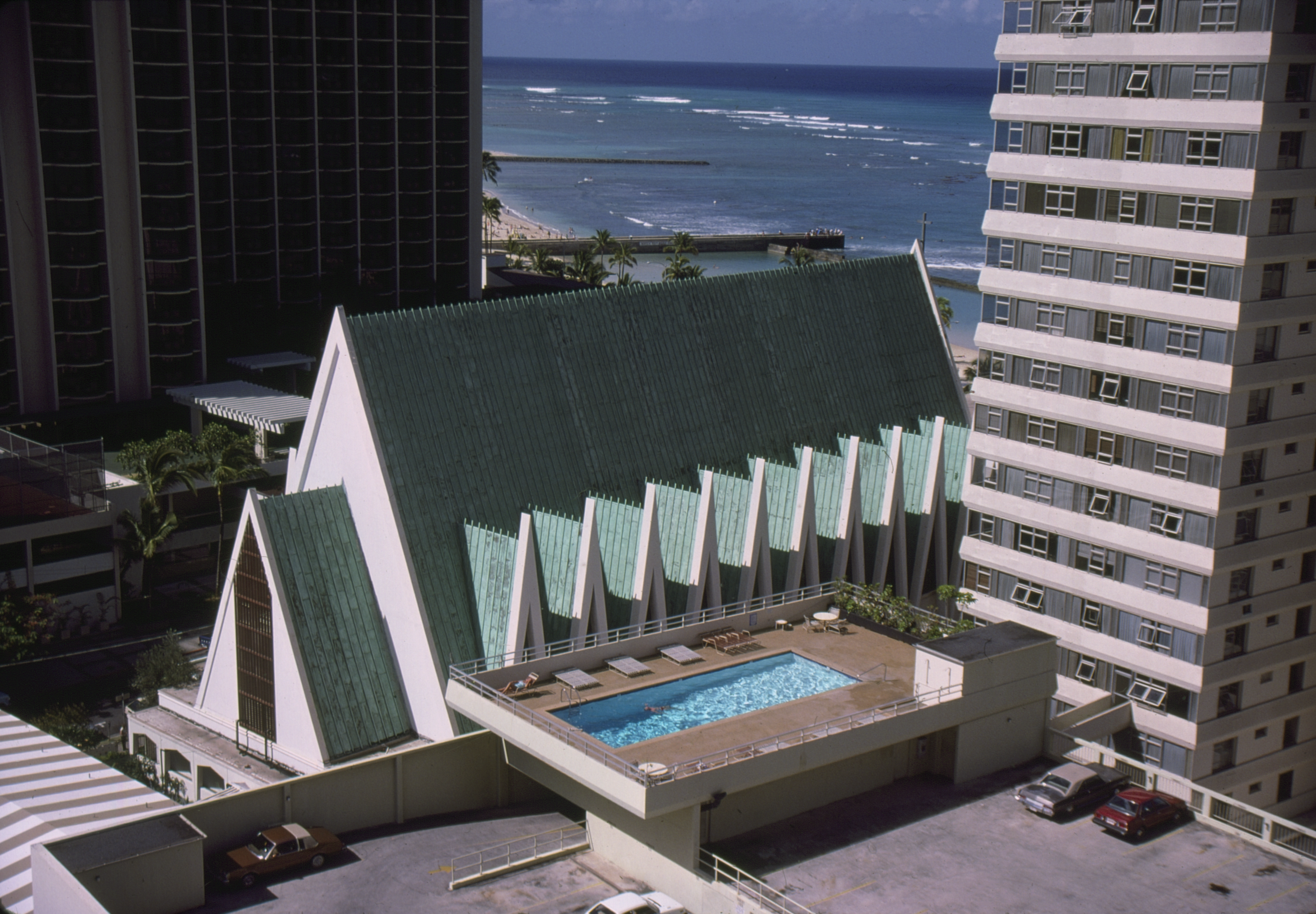
St. Augustine by the Sea, photograph by Alan Gowans. National Gallery of Art Library.

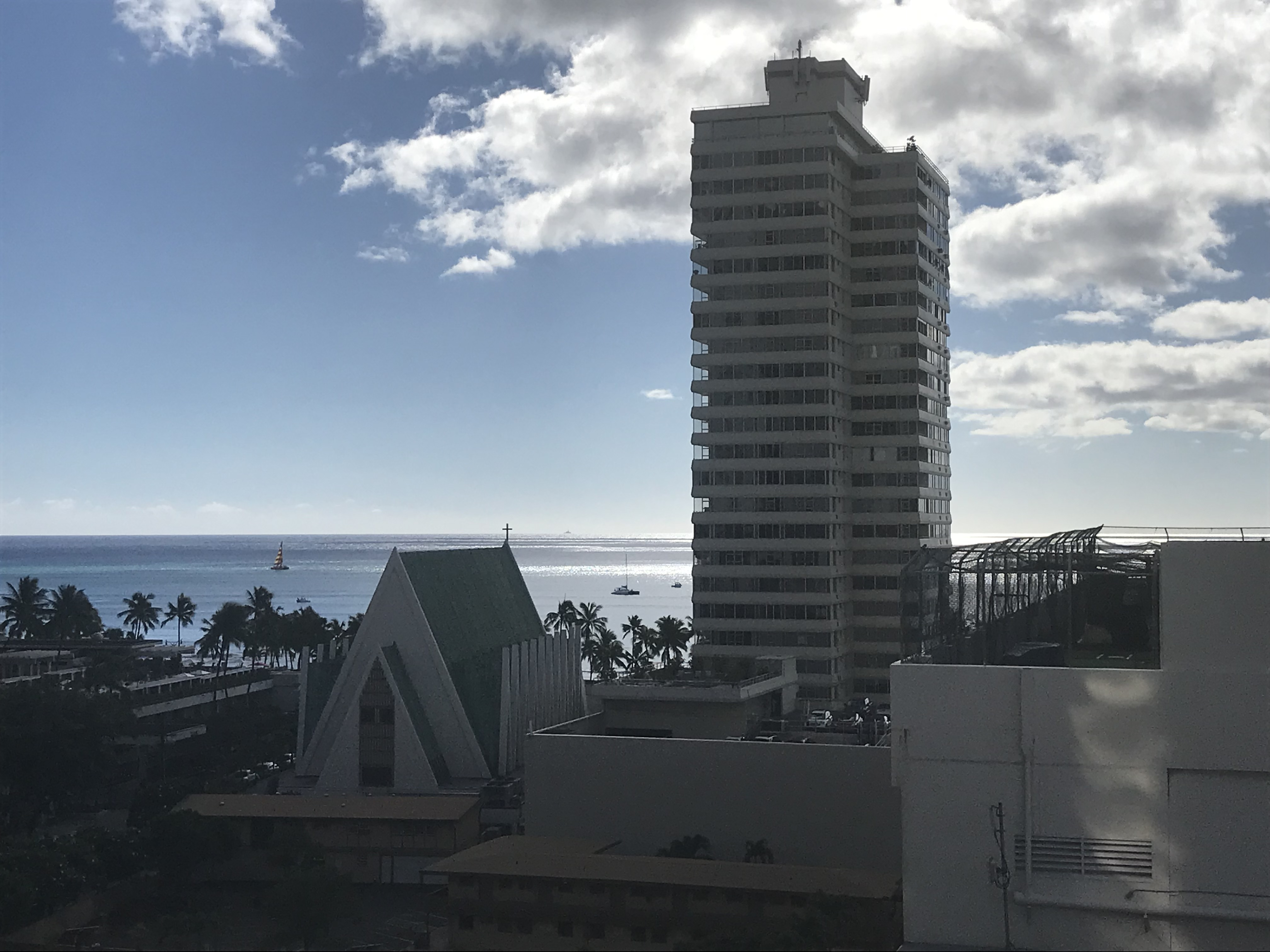
The church is in the Kapahulu neighborhood of Waikiki.
