= Ridgefield School District (Connecticut) =

Public school district in Connecticut, United States

Ridgefield Regional School District

Address
- 70 Prospect Street; Ridgefield, CT 06877 United States
- Coordinates: 41.2839974°N 74.1190603°W

District information
- Grades: PreK-12
- Superintendent: Dr. Susie Da Silva
- Schools: 9

Students and staff
- Enrollment: 4,908 (as of 2017-18)
- Faculty: 398.3 FTEs
- Student–teacher ratio: 12.3:1

Other information
- Website: District website

The Ridgefield School District is a public school district serving students in pre-kindergarten through twelfth grade in Ridgefield, Connecticut, United States.

As of the 2017–18 school year, the district, comprising nine schools, had an enrollment of 4,908 students and 398.3 classroom teachers (on an FTE basis), for a student–teacher ratio of 12.3:1.

== Schools ==
Schools in the district are:

Elementary schools

- Barlow Mountain Elementary School (329 students; in grades PreK-5)
- Branchville Elementary School (360; PreK-5)
- Farmingville Elementary School (329; K-5)
- Ridgebury Elementary School (338; PreK-5)
- Scotland Elementary School (374; PreK-5)
- Veterans Park Elementary School (282; PreK-5)

Middle schools

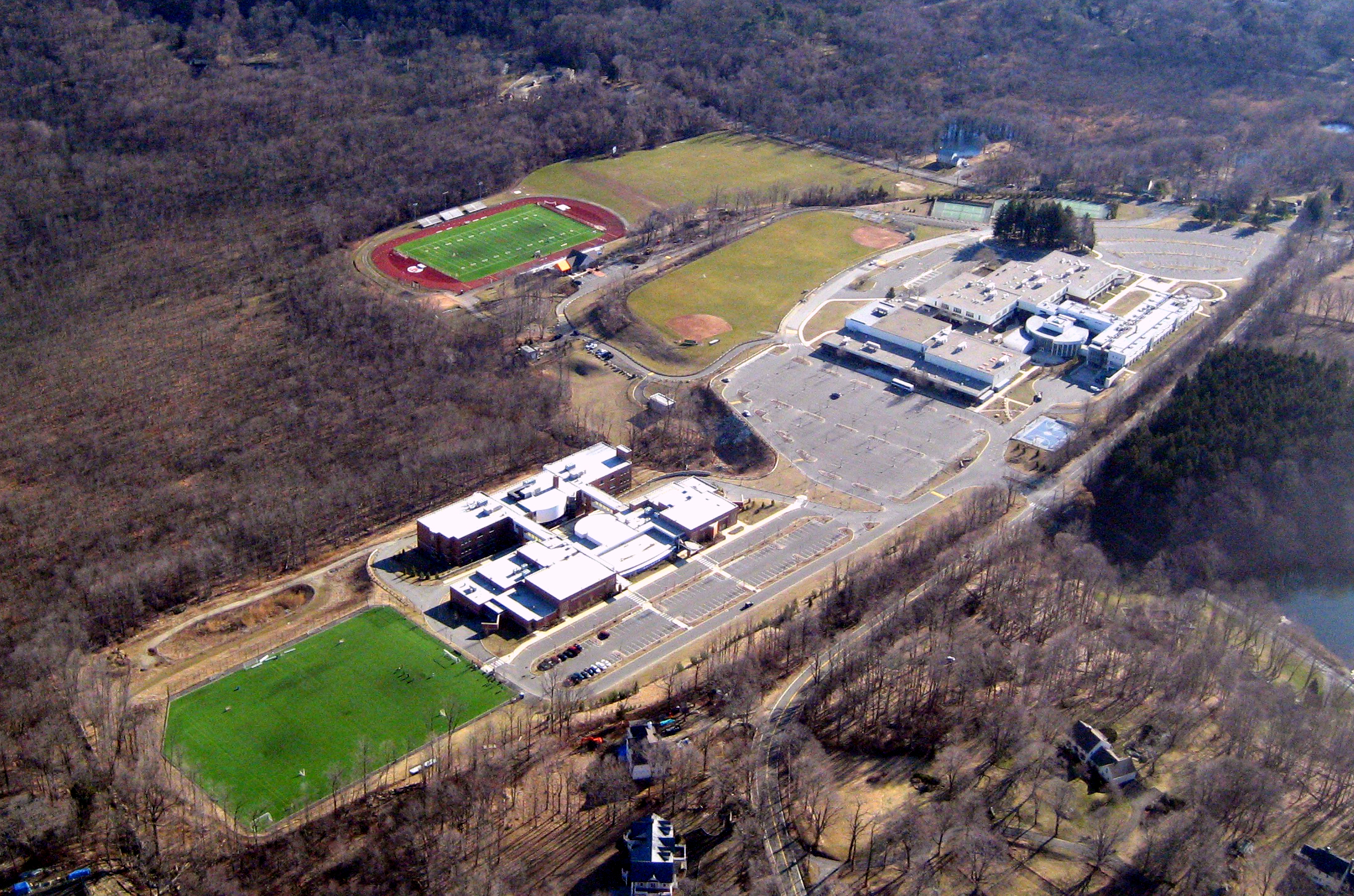
Scotts Ridge Middle School (closer) and Ridgefield High School (farther) share the same campus.

- East Ridge Middle School (500; 6–8)
- Scotts Ridge Middle School (697; 6–8)

High schools

- Ridgefield High School (1,658; 9–12)
