= Wessington Springs Carnegie Library =

- U.S. National Register of Historic Places
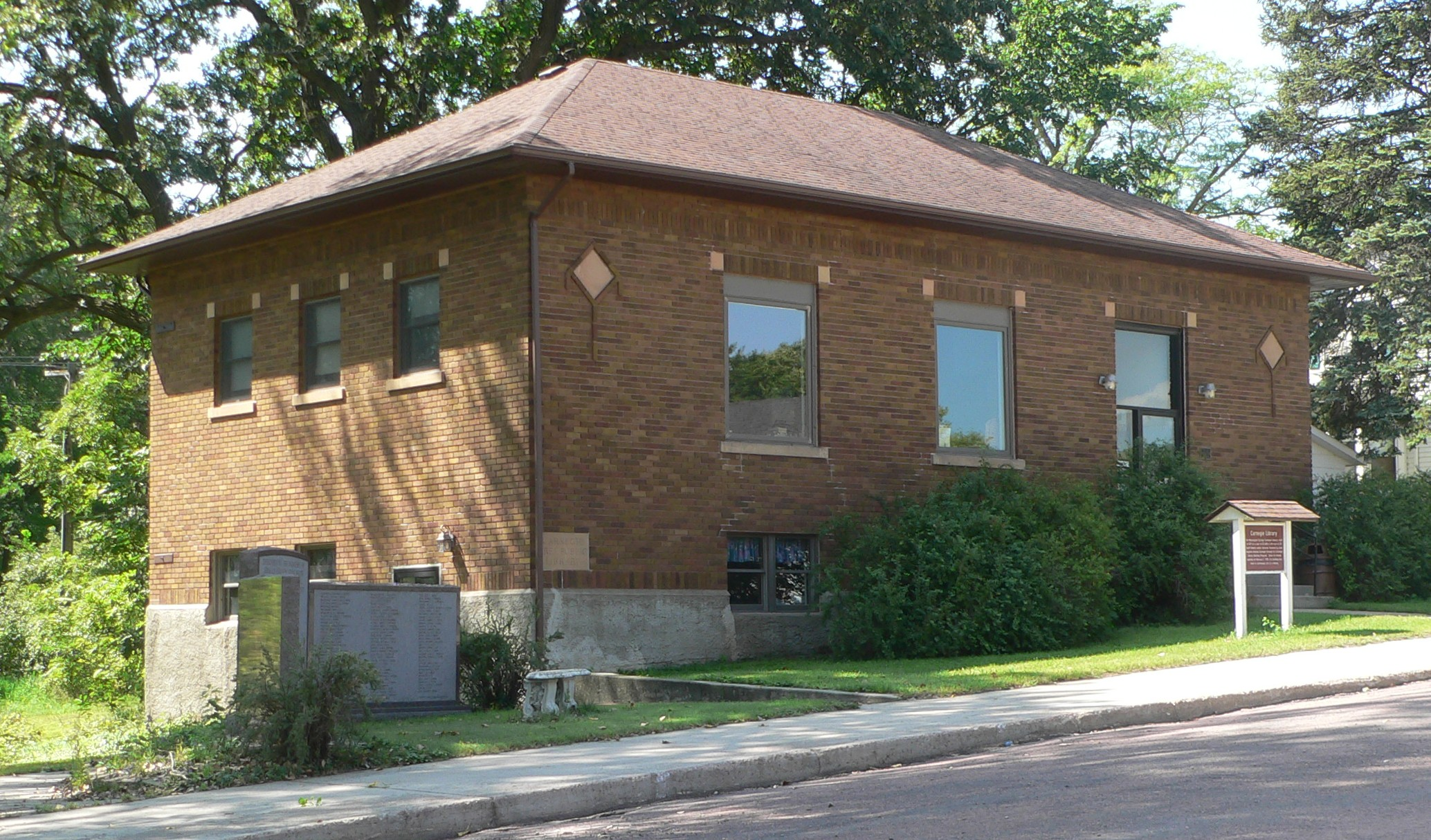

- Location within South Dakota Location within the United States
- Location: 124 N. Main Ave., Wessington Springs, South Dakota
- Coordinates: 44°04′45″N 98°34′20″W
- Area: less than one acre
- Built: 1917-18
- Architect: F. C. W. Kuehn
- Architectural style: Prairie School
- NRHP reference No.: 99000677
- Added to NRHP: June 3, 1999

The Wessington Springs Carnegie Library is a Carnegie library in Wessington Springs, South Dakota, built in 1917–18. It is Prairie School in style. It was listed on the National Register of Historic Places in 1999.

It was designed by architect F. C. W. Kuehn, of Huron, South Dakota, in "brown brick in a simplistic Prairie style. This block shape building features a low horizontal design, overhanging hip roof, and geometric decorative designs."

It has also been known as Wessington Springs Public Library.

In 1999 it was one of eight Carnegie libraries in South Dakota still being used as a library.
