= Robert S. Vessey House =

Historic house in South Dakota, United States

- U.S. National Register of Historic Places
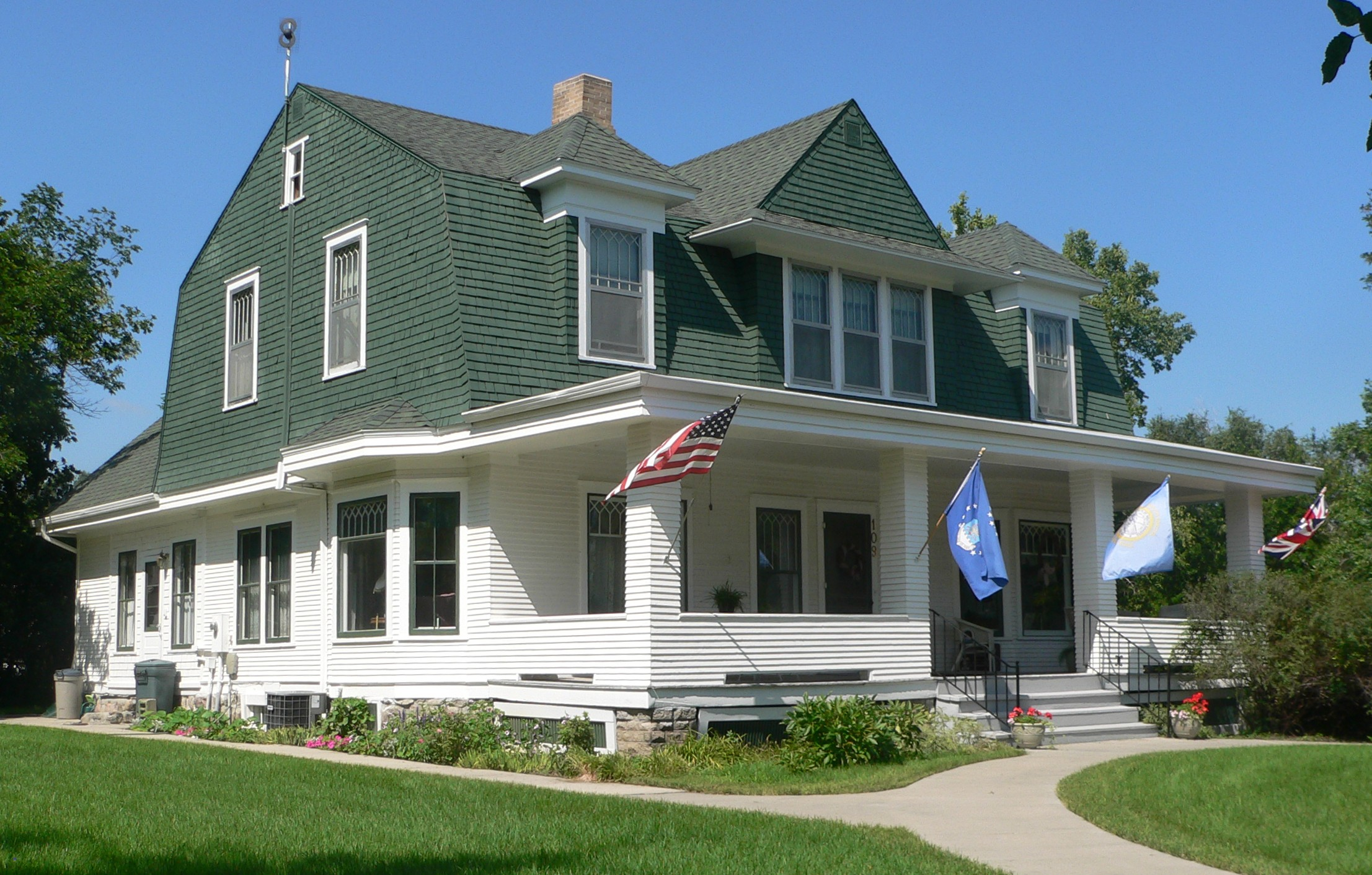
- 2017 photo

- Location within South Dakota Location within the United States
- Location: 109 College Ave., Wessington Springs, South Dakota
- Coordinates: 44°04′49″N 98°34′27″W
- Area: 1 acre (0.40 ha)
- Built: 1906
- Architectural style: Late 19th and 20th Century Revivals, Dutch Colonial
- NRHP reference No.: 78002560
- Added to NRHP: April 26, 1978

The Robert S. Vessey House, on College Avenue (Note: The NRHP nomination for the Vessey house gives its address as "118 College Avenue". However, in the 2017 photo above, the house number "109" is visible on the right side of the doorframe. The 109 number is visible also in Google Street view image captured in 2013, viewed in 2018. The address listed on the NRHP in 1977 was in error or a renumbering has since occurred.) in Wessington Springs, South Dakota, was built in 1906. It was listed on the National Register of Historic Places in 1978.

It is a two-story Dutch Colonial-style house, with three dormers above its front porch, built on a somewhat terraced corner lot.

It was home of Robert S. Vessey, who became governor of the state. The house was deemed significant in architecture and government: "Architecturally its Swedish-Dutch Colonial appearance makes it one of the better examples of every twentieth century architecture in Wessington Springs. Politically the structure is important for it housed Vessey when he was elected governor in 1908."
