= Methodist Episcopal Church of Wessington Springs =

Historic church in South Dakota, United States

- U.S. National Register of Historic Places
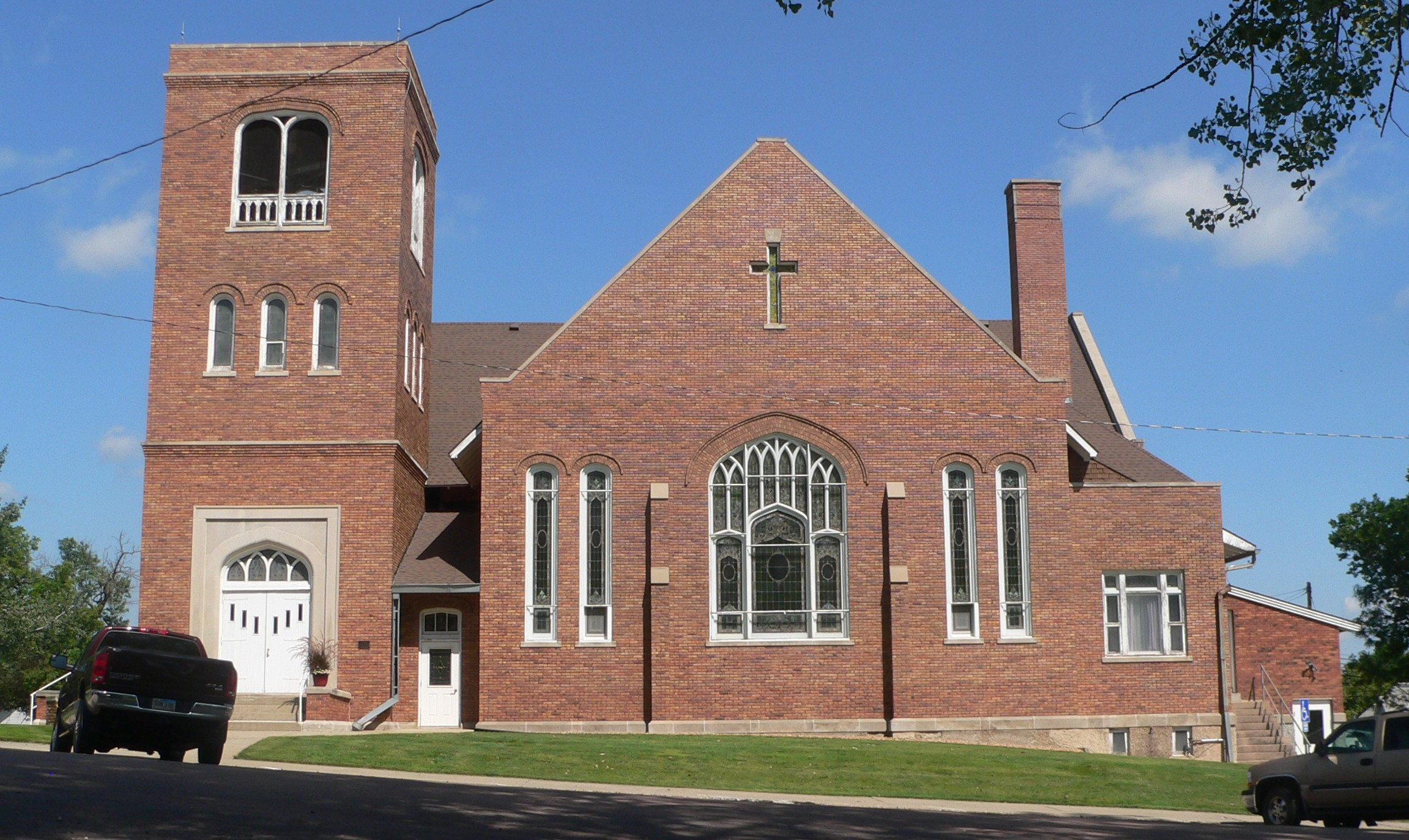

- Location within South Dakota Location within the United States
- Location: Southeast corner of Main Street and State Avenue, Wessington Springs, South Dakota
- Coordinates: 44.079686°N 98.571929°W
- Built: 1913
- Architect: Snyder, Kirby J.
- Architectural style: Late Gothic Revival
- NRHP reference No.: 99001582
- Added to NRHP: December 17, 1999

The Methodist Episcopal Church of Wessington Springs is a church at the southeast corner of Main Street and State Avenue in Wessington Springs, South Dakota. It was designed in 1913 by Kirby T Snyder in a Late Gothic Revival style. The building was added to the National Register of Historic Places in 1999.

It has also been known as First United Methodist Church. It has a Latin cross plan, and is 86 by 86 feet (26 m × 26 m) in plan. It has a 40 feet (12 m) high bell tower.
