= F. C. W. Kuehn =

American architect

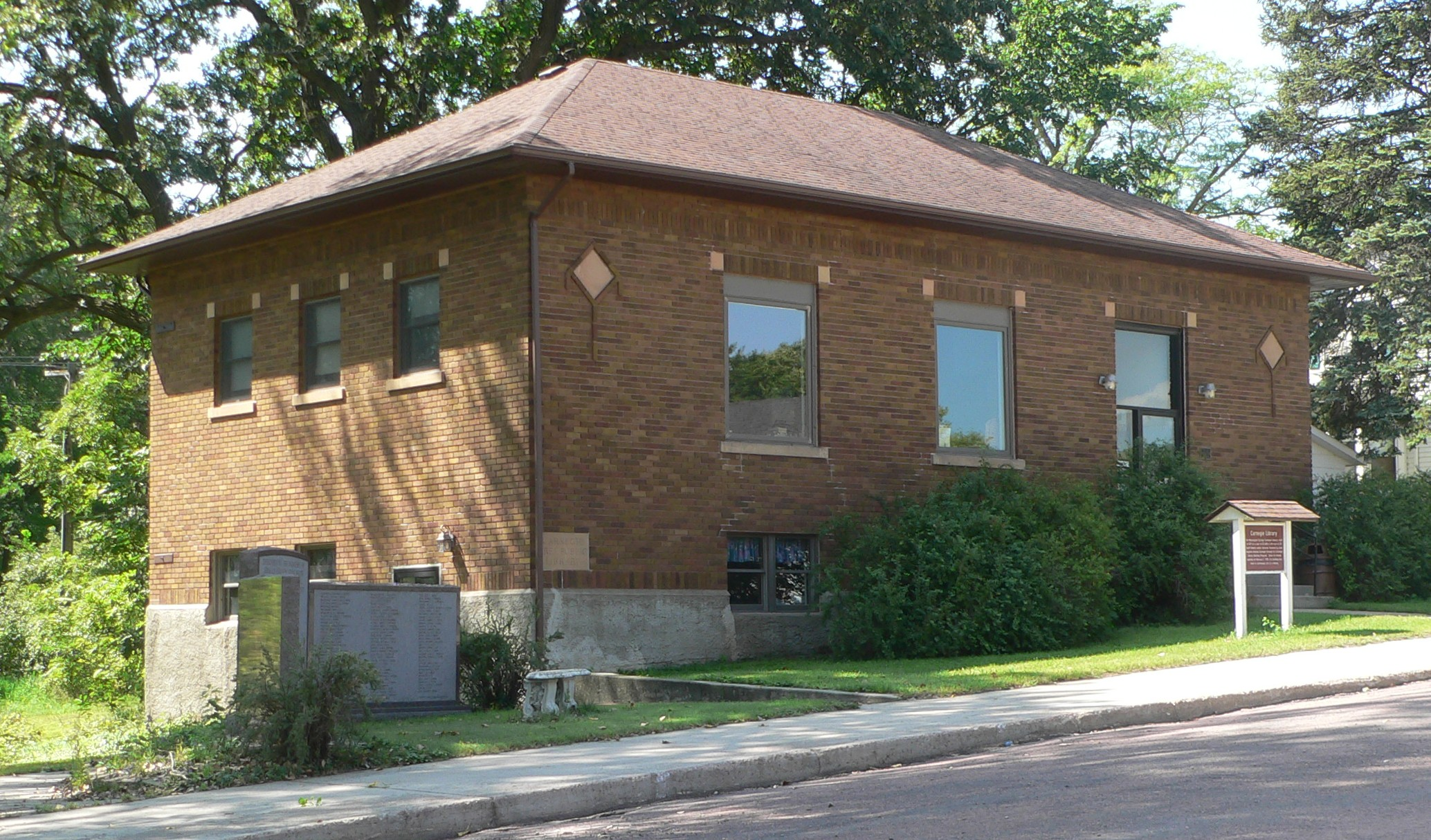
The Wessington Springs Carnegie Library, designed by Kuehn and completed in 1918.

F. C. W. Kuehn (1884–1970), whose full name was Frank Charles William Kuehn, was an architect based in Huron, South Dakota.

== Life and career ==
Frank Charles William Kuehn was born September 4, 1884, in Le Mars, Iowa to Frank Theodore Kuehn and Elizabeth Kuehn. In 1885 the family moved to a farm in Sanborn County, Dakota Territory, later South Dakota. He was educated in the district schools, and in 1903 the family relocated to Huron. Desiring to be an architect, he enrolled in courses from the International Correspondence Schools in Scranton, Pennsylvania. In 1907 he joined the office of local architect George Issenhuth, working for him for two years. He opened his own office in 1909. He developed a specialty in public schools buildings, and maintained a long relationship with the State Department of Public Instruction. Starting during World War I, Kuehn looked to other sources of income during periods of economic unstability. In 1918 he began working as an insurance agent, and used his surveying skills to produce and print county and highway maps. Circa 1950, Kuehn retired from architecture and focused on the insurance and map businesses, which remained his career until his death.

== Personal life ==
Kuehn was married in 1914 to Amelia Johanna Wagner, and they had three daughters. After Amelia died in 1950, he remarried in 1954 to Florence Dokken Hanson. He died in 1970.

== Legacy ==
He designed numerous schools and other buildings, including one listed on the National Register of Historic Places: the Wessington Springs Carnegie Library (1917–18).
