= The National School Walkout =

2018 student-led gun violence protest

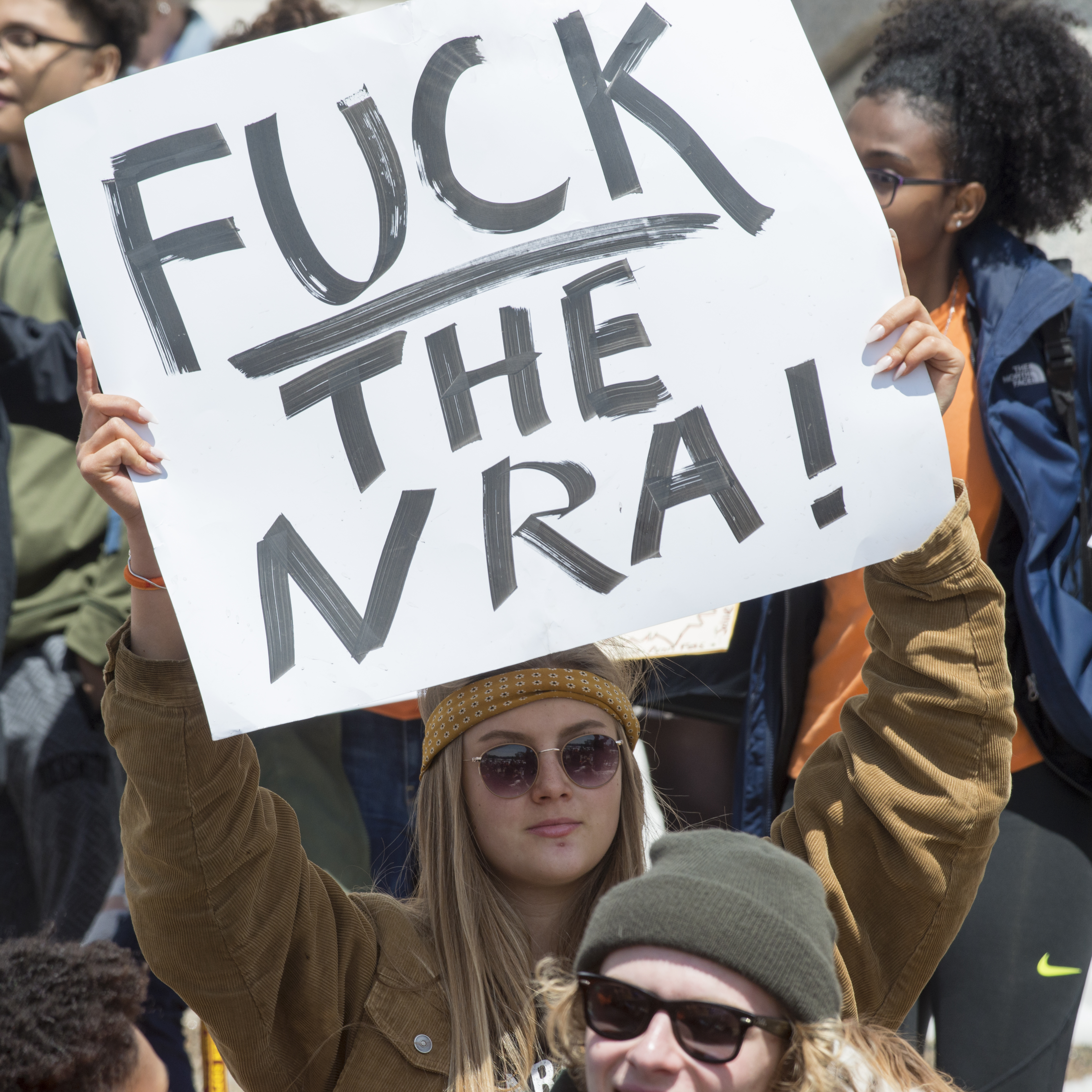
A student protester in Minnesota on the day of the walkout.

The National School Walkout was a national student-led protest on April 20, 2018, the 19th anniversary of the Columbine High School massacre. The walkout was one of many protests against gun violence in the United States that erupted in response to the Parkland high school shooting on February 14, 2018.

== Conception ==
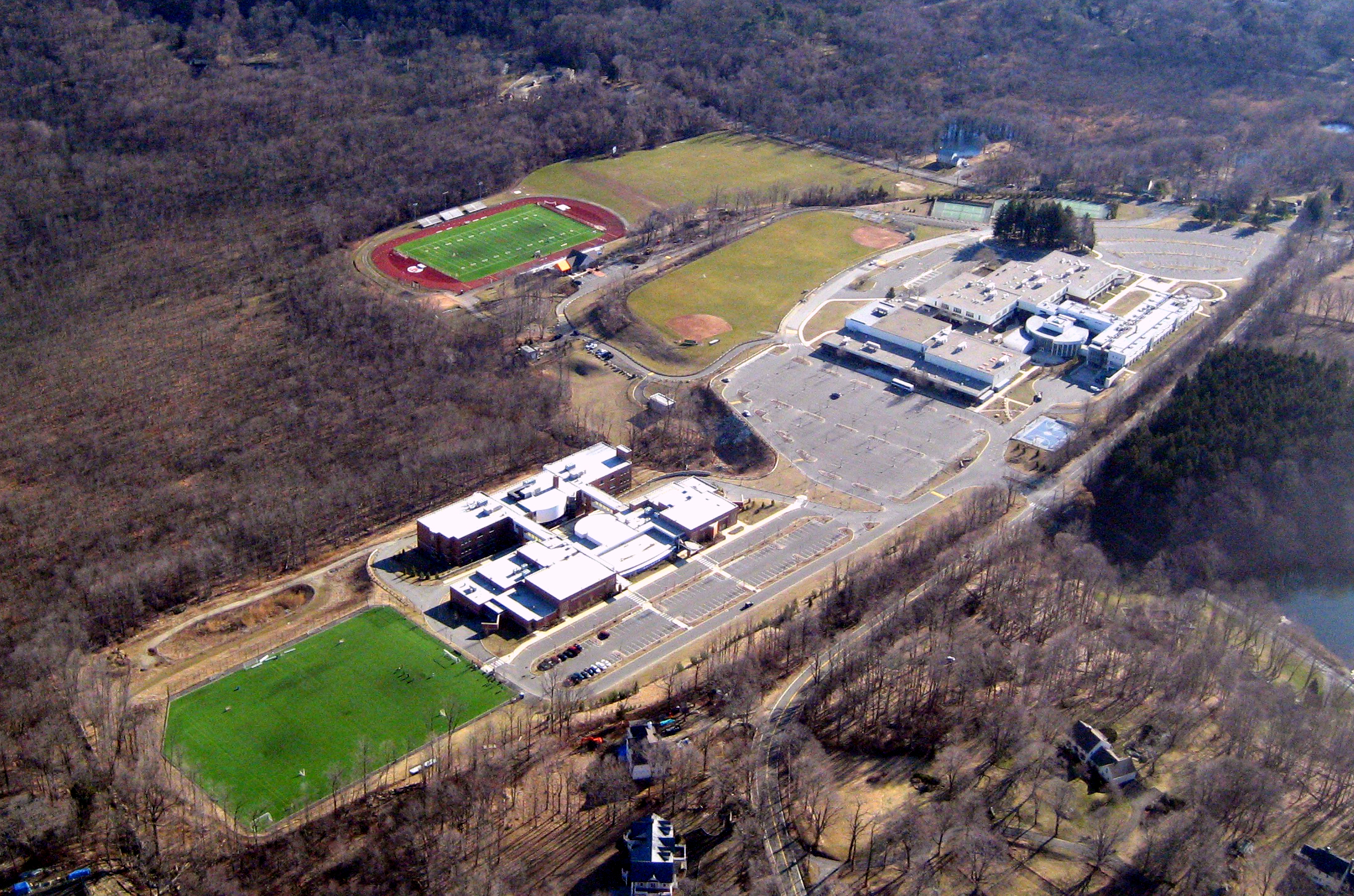
An aerial view of Scotts Ridge Middle School (closer) and Ridgefield High School (farther), which share the same campus.

After the shooting in Parkland, Ridgefield High School student Lane Murdock uploaded a petition to change.org, asking people to protest the lack of responses that follow school shootings in America by participating in a walkout. The petition accumulated over 270,000 signatures. Murdock partnered with Indivisible to successfully rollout the effort.

The National School Walkout's Twitter account accumulated more than 100,000 followers in five days. National School Walkout scheduled the nationwide walkout to take place on April 20, as it marked the 19th anniversary of the Columbine High school shooting. The official color for The National School Walkout was orange, as a nod to the color hunters wear to distinguish fellow hunters from animals.

== Event ==
Students from over 2,500 schools participated in the walkout, taking place at 10 o’clock in the morning in each local time zone. When students headed outside, they participated in 13 seconds of silence to honor the 13 people killed at Columbine High School. Many walkouts consisted of the incorporation of open mics, to guest speakers and even voter registration sections; where senior students that were eligible, registered to vote. Some students also wrote letters to students from other school communities that have been impacted by school shootings, whereas others decided to set booths where students could call their representatives to pressure lawmakers over gun control.

The April 20 walkout organized by Murdock was set to last until the end of the school day, because the issue is one that needed to be ‘'addressed [for] longer than 17 minutes". This was said in reference to the March 14 walkout, which lasted for 17 minutes to mark the 17 lives lost at the Marjory Stone High School shooting, after which students returned to their classrooms.

== Response ==
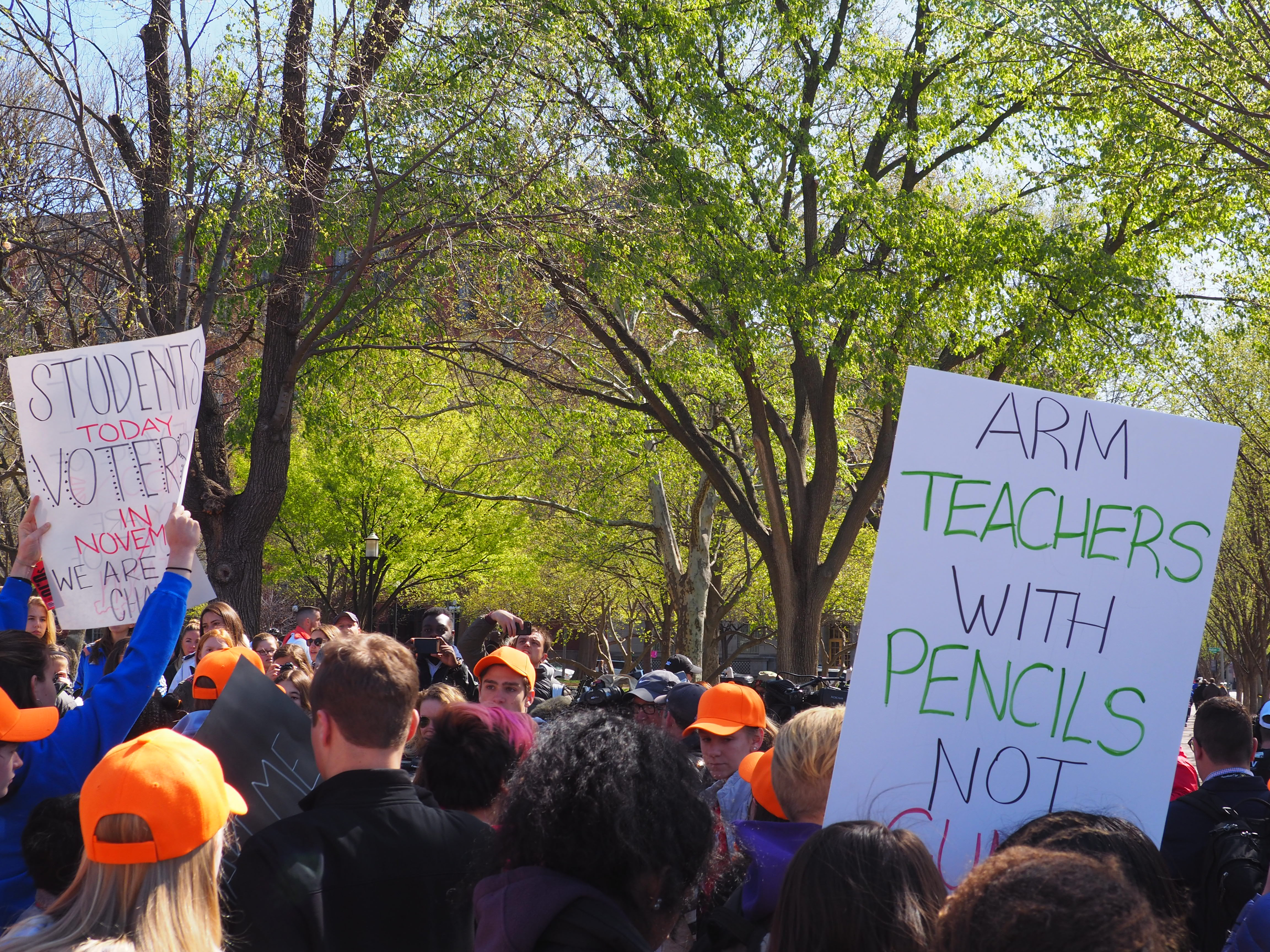
Students partaking in the National School Walkout in Washington DC on April 20.

Murdock’s plan to hold a school walkout met much criticism from different groups of people, ranging from students and staff from Columbine High school to educators of various schools and even government branches of education from different states across the country. The backlash was largely due to uncertainty about the purpose of the walkout, as well as its overlap with many standardized student exams.

National School Walkout occurred on the anniversary of the Columbine High School shooting, but faced criticism from students, alumni and staff from the high school. It was custom for classes to be cancelled on April 24 for Columbine High School students in honor of those who passed during the shooting to allow students to engage in community service. Many members from the school community expressed their dislike of the walkout being held on that day and made it clear that they did not support it. The principal from Columbine High School, Scott Christy, wrote a letter addressed to students from different high schools near the area; prompting them to partake in community service in lieu of participating in a walkout. The letter read, "Please consider planning service projects, an activity that will somehow build up your school . . . as opposed to a walkout.”

The New York City Department of Education announced that students who were absent from school due to the walkout would be marked with an unexcused absence. Other schools across the country also placed restrictions on students' ability to participate. This led to some students holding alternative events after school. However, other schools compromised with students holding demonstrations before, or after school or permitting them to attend walkouts, if they had a parental note.

Parkland students organized their own walkout in their community. The morning of the nationwide walkout, news broke that one person was injured in a shooting at Forest High School in Ocala This led to some students cancelling their planned walkouts, but also energized others, such as David Hogg, who expressed in a video posted on his social media that the event reiterated the necessity of the walkout.

American students at the tertiary level also took part in demonstrations to show their support for the National School Walkout. Harvard students also partook in the walkout, placing particular emphasis on emphasizing the rights of minority groups. American students at Oxford and Cambridge universities in England also participated in walkouts to show support to students back in the United States and call for gun control.
