= Ridgefield High School (Connecticut) =

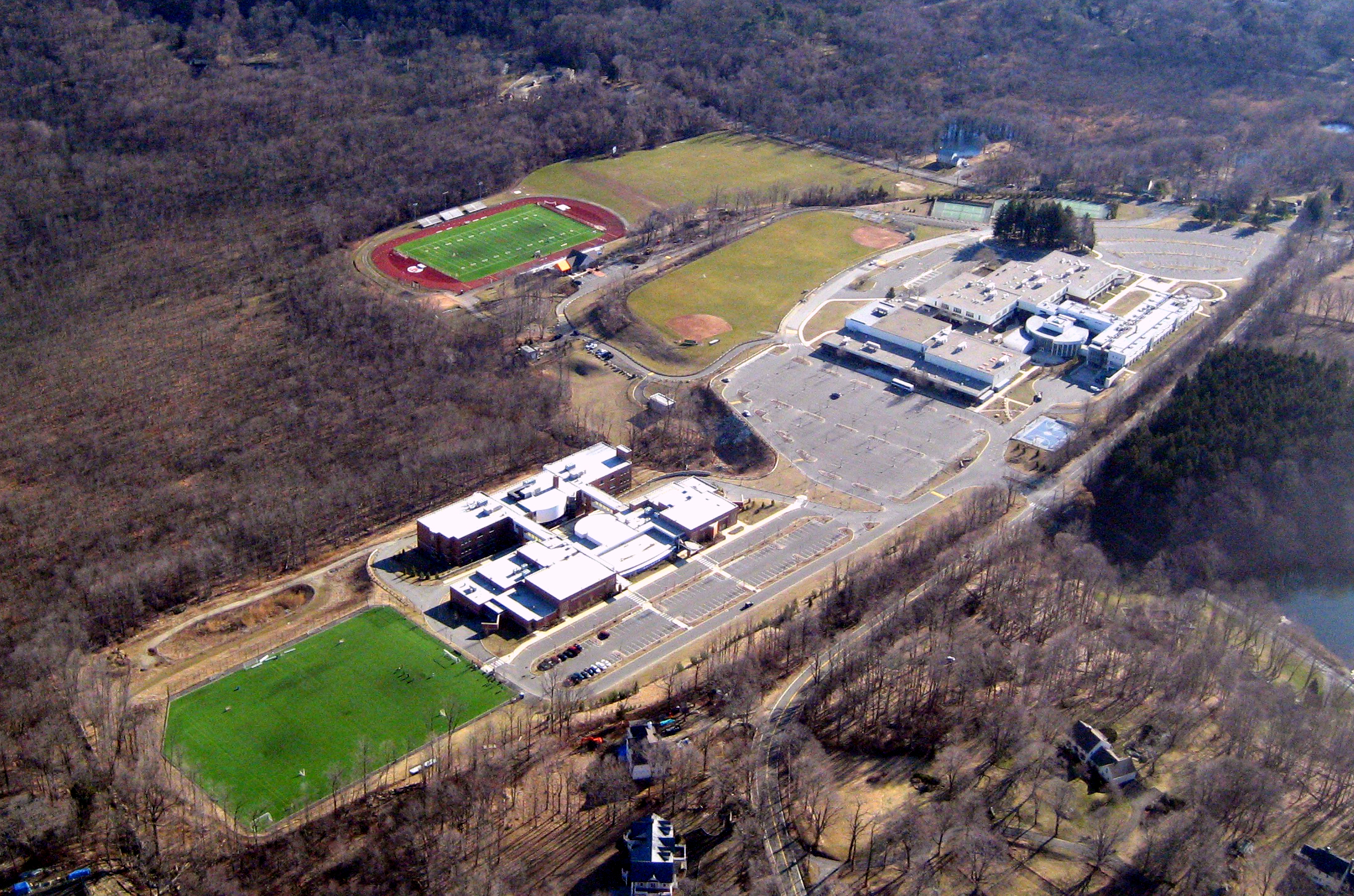
- Aerial view of the school and Scotts Ridge Middle School.

Location
- 700 North Salem Road; Ridgefield, Connecticut 06877; United States; 41°19′31″N 73°31′40″W

Information
- Other name: RHS
- Type: Public high school
- School district: Ridgefield School District
- CEEB code: 070640
- NCES School ID: 090381000779
- Principal: Jacob Greenwood
- Teaching staff: 120.64 (on an FTE basis)
- Grades: 9–12
- Enrollment: 1,420 (2023-2024)
- Student to teacher ratio: 11.77
- Colors: Orange and black
- Athletics conference: FCIAC
- Mascot: Tiger
- Website: rhs.ridgefield.org

Ridgefield High School (RHS) is a public high school in Ridgefield, Connecticut, United States. It is part of the Ridgefield School District. It was ranked 119th in Newsweek's 2015 list of the top 1,600 high schools in America and 226th in U.S. News & World Report's 2012 list of the top 4,813 high schools.

== Academics ==
The school's dropout rate has remained consistent over the years at 1%. Daily attendance has been similarly steady at 95%.

=== Course offerings ===
Ridgefield High School offers 20 AP classes, as well as multiple UConn Early College Experience classes and Multi-Variable Calculus (as an honors course, not dual enrollment). In 2012, a number of computer-related subjects were added to the curriculum, including computer art, computer music, engineering (Project Lead the Way), and digital design studio.

=== District Reference Group A ===
For the purpose of comparison with the achievement levels of similar schools, the state Department of Education classifies schools and communities in "District Reference Groups", defined as "districts whose students' families are similar in education, income, occupation and need, and that have roughly similar enrollment". Ridgefield is one of eight school districts in District Reference Group A.

=== Student achievement ===
Students and alumni of Ridgefield High School have won many prestigious academic honors, with frequent National Merit Scholarship Finalists annually. Graduates have won full rides to colleges such as the University of Virginia and Duke University.

RHS students have included Presidential Scholars, a Coca-Cola Scholar, a Jefferson Scholar, Stamps Scholars and more. The school has also produced multiple student representatives to the Connecticut State Board of Education.

== Athletics ==
About 65% of the student body participates in at least one interscholastic athletic activity. It is a member of the Fairfield County Interscholastic Athletic Conference and is in class LL for states. Each year RHS sends many students to play a variety of sports at the collegiate level. In 2019, Ridgefield High School added fencing to its list of sports, on the club level.

== Facilities ==
The school's facilities include a two-story-high, glass-enclosed student center and all marble Student Life Office. The school has a football stadium with turf field and a turf practice field adjacent to that (Tiger Hollow 1 and 2).

== Controversies ==
Over the years, but especially so in the past few, Ridgefield High School has attracted its fair share of controversy.

=== Student racism ===
In October 2017, a video of a Ridgefield High School student along with a then-recent alum painted in blackface with the headline "Nigger" went viral on social media. The post was shared hundreds of times, and deeply upset some students of color who pointed out that "Ridgefield as a town is 96% white." There was also additional controversy regarding the administration's decision to discipline student reporters who shared the information prior to extensive fact-checking, leading to the spread of some misinformation regarding the administration's training of faculty members.

=== Baseball field fire ===
A wet baseball field was doused with 24 gallons of gasoline and set on fire in a failed attempt to dry the field for a Ridgefield High School varsity baseball game in April 2019. Three RHS varsity baseball coaches were placed on administrative leave pending the outcome of a police investigation. The cost to restore the field to pre-fire condition was estimated to be in excess of $50,000.

=== Hazing ===
In 2014, a series of hazing events left many underclassmen students intoxicated as they attended class. The breadth of students that were affected by this event garnered much media coverage, with the bulk of the students being involved with athletic teams at the school. The hazing occurred as part of the school's Homecoming Spirit Week. In 2019, the school took steps to prevent hazing among its athletic teams.

=== Swastikas ===
During the 2017–2018 academic year, there were no fewer than 5 instances of swastikas drawn on or around school grounds. On September 8, 2017, an antisemitic symbol was found etched into a table at Ridgefield High School. A little more than 2 months later, on Tuesday, November 21, a swastika was found drawn on the inside of a classroom door at Ridgefield High School. Additional antisemitic symbols were found in January, June, and August. All these events led to the creation of a program for town officials to "do more than condemn" the events.

=== Threats of violence ===
In the 2018–2019 academic year, Ridgefield High School saw a surge in threats of violence against staff and students. In late May 2019, a student was arrested for threatening to initiate a school shooting. The student, whose name was not released because he or she is a minor, was charged with threatening in the first degree and breach of peace in the second degree. Earlier that year, there were instances of bomb threats in December and January. There was also an undisclosed threat made on social media in March of the same academic year.

Previous bomb threats had been made at RHS in 2007, 2008, and 2012.

== Notable alumni ==
- Jared Bernstein (1973), economist
- Nathan Bruckenthal (1997), U.S. Coast Guardsman and posthumous Bronze Star recipient
- John H. Frey (1981), member of the Connecticut House of Representatives
- Scott Heckert, NASCAR driver
- Martin Herlihy (2016), writer and comedian
- Sean M. Jenkins (1984), United States Army 1988–2021. Retired as a Major General, aka Two-Star flag officer.
- Janel Jorgensen (1989), Olympic swimmer
- Cody Keenan (1998), speechwriter for President Obama
- Kathleen M. Creighton (1984), United States Navy 1988–2021. Retired as a Rear Admiral, a Two-Star flag officer
- Jeff Landau (1992), professional tennis player
- Bill Lawrence (1986), writer/producer for shows such as Spin City and Scrubs
- Erland Van Lidth De Jeude (did not graduate, would have been class of 1973), actor, Olympic wrestler and computer professional
- Ben Mines (2018), MLS player
- Jackson Mitchell (2019), NFL linebacker most recently with the Raiders
- Lane Murdock (2020), The National School Walkout founder
- Curt Onalfo (1987), MLS player and coach
- Mark Salzman (1978), writer
- Kieran Smith (2018), Olympic swimmer
- Chris Winnes (did not graduate, would have been class of 1987), NHL player
- Anthony Alfredo NASCAR Cup Series and NASCAR Xfinity Series Driver
