= True Dakotan =

The True Dakotan
- Type: Weekly newspaper
- Format: 6 col. x 21
- Owner: Kristi Hine
- Founder(s): Dennis "Duke" Wenzel; Craig Wenzel
- Founded: 1975
- Language: English
- Headquarters: 113 East Main; P.O. Box 358; Wessington Springs, South Dakota 57382-0358; USA
- Circulation: 1,338
- Website: truedakotan.com

The True Dakotan is a weekly newspaper in South Dakota. The paper services the cities of Lane, Alpena, and Wessington Springs. It publishes every Wednesday with a circulation of 1,338.

== History ==
In 1975, brothers Dennis "Duke" and Craig Wenzel founded the True Dakotan in Wessington Springs, South Dakota. In 2015, the Wenzel family sold the paper to Kristi Hine. In 2020, the paper's office was damaged in a fire. In 2023, Hine was elected president of the South Dakota Newspaper Association.
