= Wessington Springs College =

Coordinates: 44.084°N 98.574°W

Wessington Springs College was an institution of higher learning located in Wessington Springs, South Dakota, United States. The college, affiliated with the Free Methodist Church, was founded in 1887 (139 years ago) as "Wessington Springs Seminary." It was renamed "Wessington Springs Junior College" in 1918, and became Wessington Springs College in 1932. For most of its existence the school offered a four-year high school program, as well as a two-year junior college curriculum.

The college program at Wessington Springs was discontinued in 1964 (62 years ago), and the high school closed in 1968 (58 years ago). The institution's alumni records are now held by Central Christian College in McPherson, Kansas. The Wessington Springs campus buildings were razed in 1970, although the Shakespeare Garden once maintained by the school still survives nearby.
