= Alpena, South Dakota =

- Town
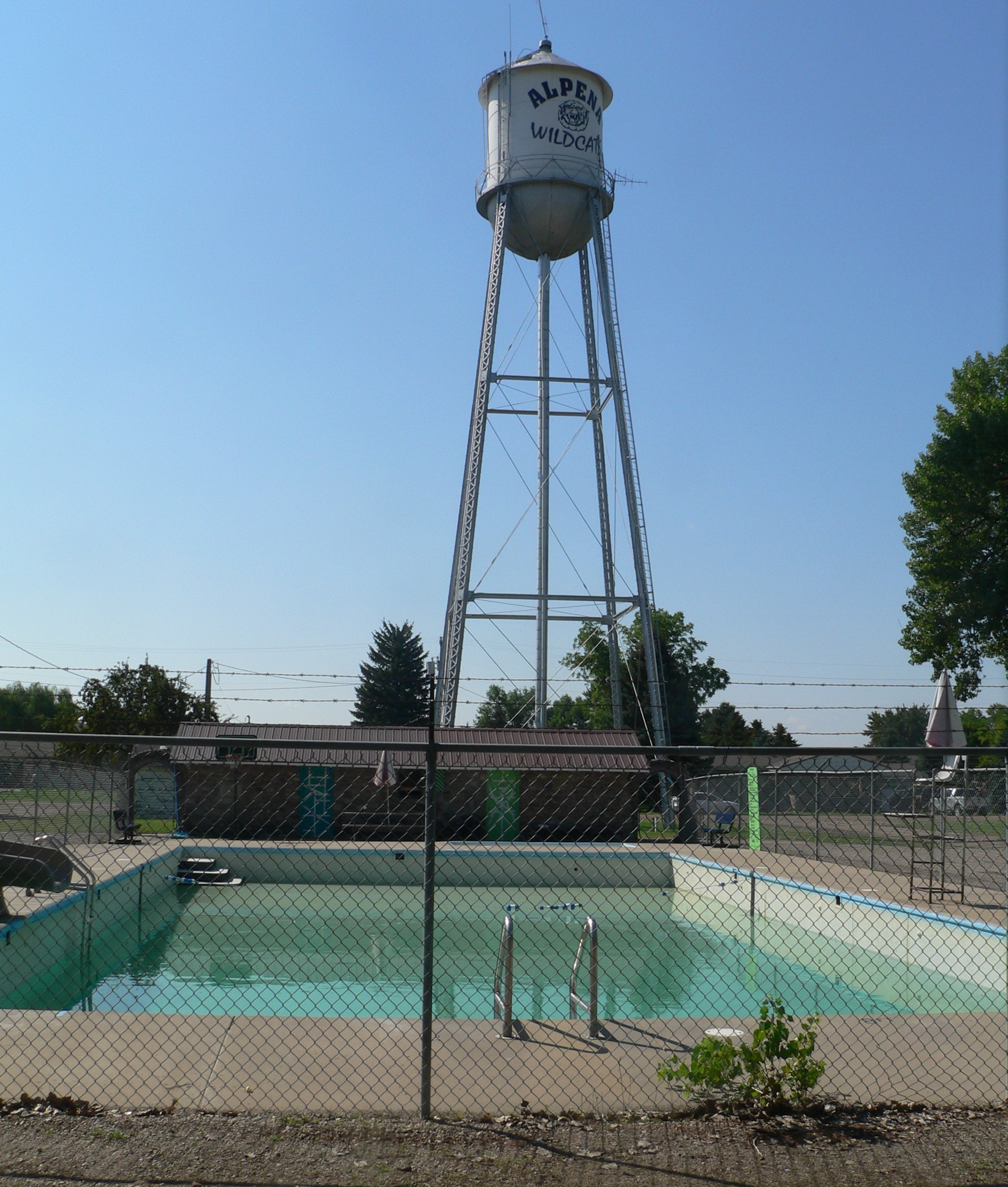
- The historic Alpena Bathhouse and Swimming Pool with Alpena's water tower in the background in 2017

- Location in Jerauld County and the state of South Dakota
- Coordinates: 44°10′59″N 98°22′06″W
- Country: United States
- State: South Dakota
- County: Jerauld
- Platted: 1883

Area
  - Total: 1.64 sq mi (4.26 km^{2})
  - Land: 1.63 sq mi (4.22 km^{2})
  - Water: 0.015 sq mi (0.04 km^{2})
- Elevation: 1,322 ft (403 m)

Population (2020)
  - Total: 212
  - Density: 130.0/sq mi (50.19/km^{2})
- Time zone: UTC-6 (Central (CST))
  - Summer (DST): UTC-5 (CDT)
- ZIP code: 57312
- Area code: 605
- FIPS code: 46-01020
- GNIS feature ID: 1267264
- Website: www.alpenasd.com

Alpena (pronounced al-PEE'-nuh) is a town in northeastern corner of Jerauld County, South Dakota, United States. As of the 2020 census, Alpena had a population of 212.

== History ==
Alpena was platted in 1883, and most likely was named after Alpena, Michigan, the native home of the town's proprietor. A post office has been in operation at Alpena since 1883.

On June 18th, 2014, an EF4 tornado formed south of Alpena and destroyed a farmhouse just south of town. One person was injured and a pet was killed due to falling debris.

== Geography ==
According to the United States Census Bureau, the town has a total area of 1.64 square miles (4.25 km^{2}), of which 1.63 square miles (4.22 km^{2}) is land and 0.01 square miles (0.03 km^{2}) is water.

== Demographics ==
Historical population
Census	Pop.	Note	%±
1900	153		—
1910	417		172.5%
1920	576		38.1%
1930	499		−13.4%
1940	440		−11.8%
1950	426		−3.2%
1960	407		−4.5%
1970	307		−24.6%
1980	288		−6.2%
1990	251		−12.8%
2000	265		5.6%
2010	286		7.9%
2020	212		−25.9%
U.S. Decennial Census

=== 2010 census ===
As of the census of 2010, there were 286 people, 110 households, and 73 families residing in the town. The population density was 175.5 inhabitants per square mile (67.8/km^{2}). There were 124 housing units at an average density of 76.1 per square mile (29.4/km^{2}). The racial makeup of the town was 86.7% White, 0.7% Native American, 1.0% Pacific Islander, 9.8% from other races, and 1.7% from two or more races. Hispanic or Latino of any race were 23.8% of the population.

There were 110 households, of which 30.9% had children under the age of 18 living with them, 53.6% were married couples living together, 8.2% had a female householder with no husband present, 4.5% had a male householder with no wife present, and 33.6% were non-families. 27.3% of all households were made up of individuals, and 8.2% had someone living alone who was 65 years of age or older. The average household size was 2.60 and the average family size was 3.18.

The median age in the town was 34.3 years. 26.2% of residents were under the age of 18; 5.6% were between the ages of 18 and 24; 27.9% were from 25 to 44; 24.8% were from 45 to 64; and 15.4% were 65 years of age or older. The gender makeup of the town was 51.0% male and 49.0% female.

=== 2000 census ===
As of the census of 2000, there were 265 people, 113 households, and 78 families residing in the town. The population density was 161.1 inhabitants per square mile (62.2/km^{2}). There were 122 housing units at an average density of 74.2 per square mile (28.6/km^{2}). The racial makeup of the town was 99.62% White and 0.38% Asian. Hispanic or Latino of any race were 0.38% of the population.

There were 113 households, out of which 30.1% had children under the age of 18 living with them, 58.4% were married couples living together, 8.0% had a female householder with no husband present, and 30.1% were non-families. 28.3% of all households were made up of individuals, and 8.8% had someone living alone who was 65 years of age or older. The average household size was 2.35 and the average family size was 2.82.

In the town, the population was spread out, with 24.9% under the age of 18, 6.0% from 18 to 24, 23.0% from 25 to 44, 28.3% from 45 to 64, and 17.7% who were 65 years of age or older. The median age was 41 years. For every 100 females, there were 108.7 males. For every 100 females age 18 and over, there were 114.0 males.

The median income for a household in the town was $35,455, and the median income for a family was $38,000. Males had a median income of $25,625 versus $16,607 for females. The per capita income for the town was $13,533. About 10.4% of families and 14.4% of the population were below the poverty line, including 18.5% of those under the age of eighteen and none of those sixty five or over.

== Media ==
The area is served by the True Dakotan weekly newspaper.

== Notable person ==
- Al Neuharth, USA Today editor

== See also ==
- List of towns in South Dakota
