= Joseph Kalmer =

Austrian writer, poet and translator (1898–1959)

Joseph Kalmer (17 August 1898, Nehrybka, today Poland – 9 July 1959, Vienna) was an Austrian writer, poet and translator.

Kalmer attended high school in Czernowitz and gymnasium in Vienna. He started to write during his studies, and later became a journalist. In 1938, after the Anschluss, he emigrated to Czechoslovakia and a year later to England where he set up a literary agency.

In 1935, together with Ludwig Huyn, Kalmer wrote a book Abessinien (Abyssinia or Ethiopia) about travel to that country. The book is a vivid and detailed description of the history, people and customs of this ancient country getting dragged into the modern age under threat of war with Italy. The book was translated into several languages (e.g. into Czech, 1935).

== In popular culture ==
Kalmer is mentioned during a sketch of the Argentine humorous program Cha Cha Cha. When the Mormon character says:

... when Bochini comes down on Mount Caliburn, he talks to two people, one is called Joseph Kalmer....
