= Lane Murray =

American educator

Lane Murray (1921–2009) was an educator who helped found the correctional education system in prisons in Texas.

== Windham School District ==
In 1969, the Texas Board of Corrections created Windham School District, the country's first correctional school district. Murray became the first superintendent of the newly established Windham School District at a time when others were skeptical prison education would decrease prisoners' recidivism rates.
