= Oscar Willis Layne =

Panamanian racing cyclist

Personal information
- Born: 12 June 1918 Panama City, Panama
- Died: 24 February 2016 (aged 97)

Cycling career
- Sport: Cycling
- Discipline: Racing
- Role: Rider
Medal record
Representing Panama
Central American and Caribbean Games
Gold medal – first place	1938	Cycling
Gold medal – first place	1946	Cycling
Gold medal – first place	1950	Cycling

Oscar Willis Layne (12 June 1918 – 24 February 2016) was a Panamanian racing cyclist.

== Biography ==
Layne was born in Panama City on 12 June 1918, to Barbadian parents. He is the winner of three gold medals, from the Central American and Caribbean Games in 1938, 1946 and 1950. On 30 May 2002, Panama City mayor Juan Carlos Navarro presented him with the key to the city.

Oscar Layne died on 24 February 2016, at the age of 97.
