= Laning (surname) =

Laning is surname. Notable people with the surname include:

- Albert P. Laning (1817–1880), New York politician
- Edward Laning (1906–1981), American painter
- Harris Laning (1873–1941), United States Navy admiral
- J. Ford Laning (1853–1941), American politician
- J. Halcombe Laning, Jr. (1920–2012), American computer pioneer
