= Lane Tanner =

American winemaker and consultant

- Born: Kelseyville, California, U.S.
- Education: San Jose State University
- Occupations: Winemaker; consultant

Lane Tanner is an American winemaker and consultant. She was the second woman winemaker in Santa Barbara County when she started working in the industry in 1981. She goes by the nickname "Pinot Czarina."

== Personal life and education ==
Tanner grew up in Kelseyville, California. She graduated from San Jose State University with a degree in chemistry in 1976. After graduating, she started working in the air pollution industry. One winter she worked in Glendive, Montana. After Glendive, she quit her job and moved back to Kelseyville. Tanner was married to the owner of The Hitching Post. Tanner is now married to winemaker Ariki Hill.

== Career ==
In 1980, Tanner started working in the bottling department, putting wine labels on bottles, at Konocti Winery in Kelseyville. When the winery learned that she had studied chemistry she became a lab technician. She worked there for one year and worked with Andre Tchelistcheff. She was suggested by Tchelistcheff for a job at Firestone Winery. She joined Firestone in 1981 as a winemaker. At Firestone she was able to improve her skills in wine tasting and in 1984 she started her on consulting firm. Her first client was making wine for The Hitching Post. She was one of the first winemakers to use Pinot grapes from Bien Nacido Vineyard. In late 2010 she retired from the wine industry. In 2012, Tanner was named winemaker for Sierra Madre Vineyard. At Sierra Madre, she makes Pinot noir, Chardonnay and Pinot blanc wines.

=== Lane Tanner Winery ===
Tanner started her own winery in 1989, Lane Tanner Winery. The label became the first in the Central Coast region to devote itself to Pinot noir. The winery is located in the Santa Maria Valley AVA and the first wine was a 1989 vintage. The label made approximately 1,800 cases a year and specialized in Pinot noir. They also made Syrah. The Pinot noir grapes came from three vineyards in Santa Barbara County: Julia's Vineyard, Bien Nacido Vineyard, and Melville Vineyard. The Syrah grapes came from French Camp Vineyard which is located in San Luis Obispo County. Tanner's wines aim to stay low in alcohol content and sulfites. The latter is because Tanner is allergic to them. The Pinot was fermented for over two weeks with yeast. It was then aged for eleven months in 46 percent French oak barrels. The last vintage was in 2009. The back of her Pinot bottles had the motto: "laugh more- flirt often," written on them.
