= The Lane Hotel =

- U.S. National Register of Historic Places
- Virginia Landmarks Register
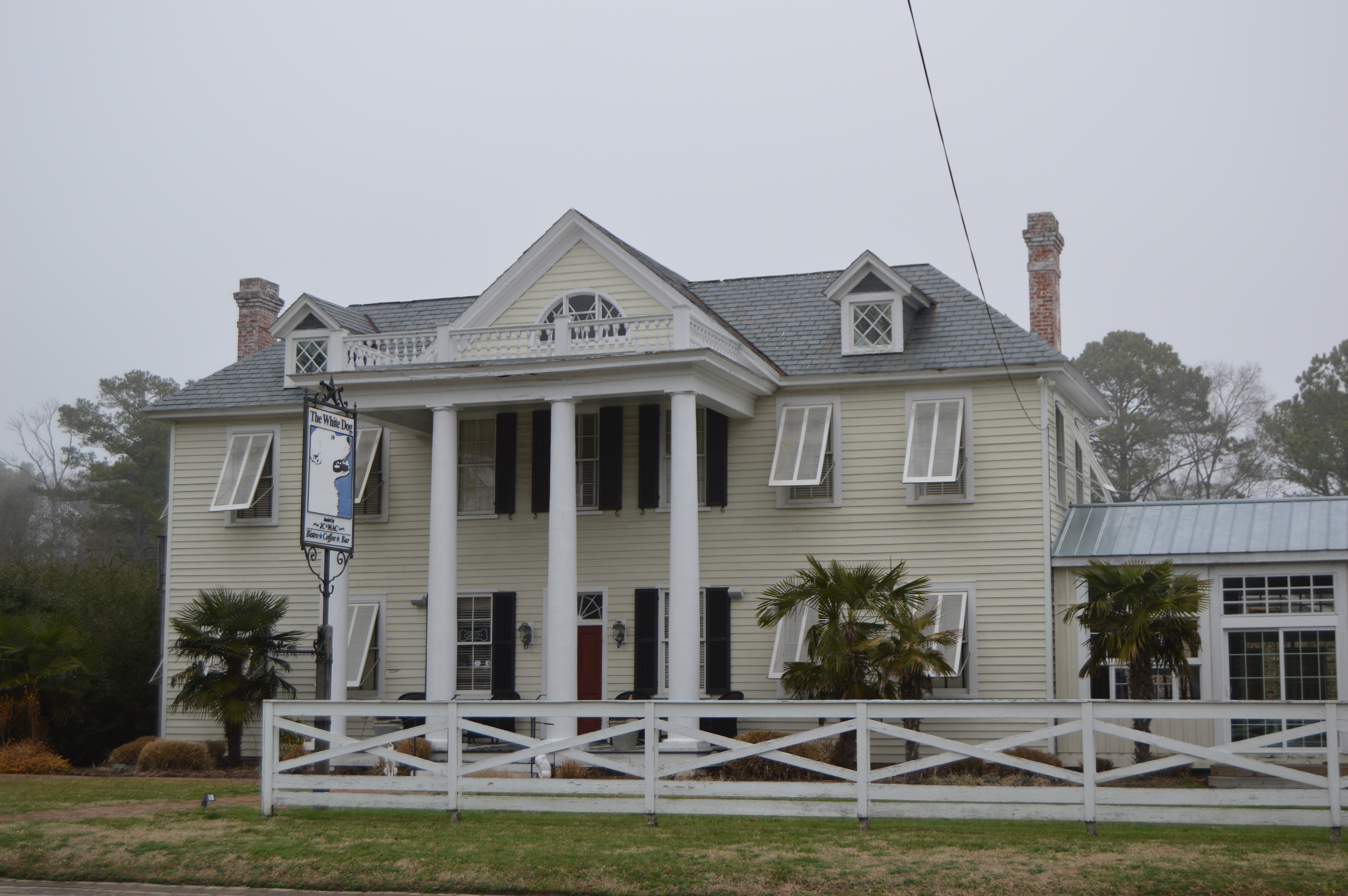
- Front of the hotel

- Location within Virginia Location within the United States
- Location: 68 Church Street, Mathews, Virginia
- Coordinates: 37°26′3″N 76°19′19″W
- Area: 1.62 acres (0.66 ha)
- Built: c. 1840
- Architectural style: Greek Revival
- NRHP reference No.: 11000065
- VLR No.: 057-0070

Significant dates
- Added to NRHP: March 1, 2011
- Designated VLR: December 16, 2010

The Lane Hotel, also known as the Hotel Mathews and The White Dog Inn, is a historic inn and tavern located at Mathews, Mathews County, Virginia. It was built about 1840, and is a 2 1/2-story, rectangular frame building with an adjoining kitchen. It features a prominent two-story Greek Revival front porch added in 1916 and a three-part, semi-circular window under the front gable known as a "Billups" Window. Also added in 1916 to the east and west of the original building are two-story square wings. The building was moved back from Grove street an approximate distance of 25 feet in 1916.

It was listed on the National Register of Historic Places in 2011. It is currently the site of a restaurant called the White Dog Bistro.
