= Lane K. Akiona =

American priest

Lane K. Akiona is a Roman Catholic priest of the Hawaiian Province of the Congregation of the Sacred Hearts of Jesus and Mary and a member of the Order of the Holy Sepulchre and the Order of Saint Lazarus of Jerusalem.

He was born on the island of Moloka‘i in the Hawaiian Islands and serves as pastor of Saint Augustine by the Sea Catholic Church in the Waikiki district of Honolulu. He also served as the vicar forane for the East Honolulu Vicariate of the Roman Catholic Diocese of Honolulu. Fr. Lane, has been the priest at St. Augustine's since January 2006.

He serves as the Provincial of the United States Province of the Priests and Brothers of the Sacred Hearts of Jesus and Mary (SS.CC.).
