= Jean Thomas Dulaien =

18th-century French pirate

- Possible design of Jean Dulaien's flag, also often incorrectly attributed to pirate Walter Kennedy.
- Born: c. 1704
- Other name: Dulaiën
- Occupation: Pirate
- Years active: 1727–1728
- Known for: Preserved copies of his Articles (pirate code) and black flag
- Piratical career
- Other names: du Lain
- Base of operations: Caribbean
- Commands: Sans Pitié

Jean Thomas Dulaien (fl. 1727–1728) was a French pirate active in the Caribbean. He is known for preserved copies of his Articles (pirate code) and black flag.

== History ==
Born in about 1704, Dulaien received a respectable education in France and was a licensed ship's pilot. By 1727 he was aboard a privateer ship in the Caribbean, cruising against the English with a crew that was part Spanish, part French. The French crewmen mutinied, massacring the Spaniards and electing Dulaien as captain. They renamed the ship Sans Pitié (Merciless).

The crew agreed to a shared set of Articles for governing behavior aboard ship. As in other pirate codes, there were provisions for punishing sailors who deserted, hid loot, argued, or were derelict in their duties. The Articles also allowed for compensation for injured sailors, and appointed a lieutenant to monitor cargo aboard captured ships. The killing of prisoners was prohibited, unless, notably, they were Spanish. Unlike most pirate Articles, Dulaien's specified precise conditions under which his prey would be shown no mercy. If a ship resisted him after seeing his black flag, he would raise a so-called "bloody flag" (or Pavillon Sans Quartier in French, "Flag of No Quarter"), a red flag warning that no quarter (no mercy) would be given if the victims did not surrender willingly. If his victims fired three or more cannon shots thereafter, none of them would be spared.

Dulaien found a lurking place for his 60-ton, 14-gun vessel among the tall trees on the shores of West Caicos. He quickly captured over a dozen ships – some of them French – and absorbed the best of them into his flotilla, keeping others for careening the Sans Pitié. He appointed an associate named Garnier to command his consort ship, renamed Sans Quartier (No Quarter). Within a year they decided to divide their plunder and return to France to seek a pardon. After dropping off most of his crew on Tortuga and preparing to leave for Nantes, Dulaien is said to have surprised the crew of the Sans Quartier as he sailed away with most of their treasure, calling out "Goodbye! Farewell, scoundrels! I go to France and I am no longer a pirate."

French officials offered Dulaien a pardon on the condition that he surrender any stolen goods. Before accepting the offer, he and his crew sold their loot and hid the proceeds, leaving some with friends and relatives. The authorities suspected that the little plunder they found on the Sans Pitié was only a small part of what Dulaien had stolen, and they persuaded local priests to threaten citizens who aided the pirates with excommunication. The threat worked, and after informants had led them to the hidden treasure, the officials arrested Dulaien and his crew. The Sans Pitié, in poor condition, was sold off to help defray the losses of the merchants whose cargoes Dulaien had plundered. After appeals to the King, the crew were released, but Dulaien was left in jail for some time longer: his ultimate fate is not known.

== Jolly Roger ==
Jolly Roger pirate flag of Jean Thomas Dulaien (alternate design), per Ed Fox.

Along with the black flag the letter also describes a plain red flag and plain red pennant.

Dulaien's pirate flag was described by the mayor of Nantes as "black cloth, with white designs of human figures, cutlasses, bones, and hourglasses." A woodblock purportedly made from a drawing of the flag has survived, as have other independent drawings of it. The original flag was preserved for some years, but possibly later destroyed on orders from King Louis XV. Dulaien's flag is often confused with that of Walter Kennedy, which was described in similar terms. Because the original flag is missing and the extant drawings of it vary, its exact design is unknown. There is no evidence of Walter Kennedy flying this flag; after he mutinied against Bartholomew Roberts, Kennedy and the rest of the crew retired from piracy and sailed to Ireland.

== See also ==
- Montigny la Palisse – another French pirate active late in the Golden Age of Piracy.
