= Lane Murdock =

American activist

- Born: Lane Maxine Murdock; April 3, 2002 (age 23); Texas, United States
- Education: Ridgefield High School, Edinburgh Napier University

Lane Maxine Murdock (born 3 April 2002) is an activist and founder of The National School Walkout.

== Early life and education ==
Lane Murdock was born in 2002 in Texas. When she was four years old she moved to Ridgefield, Connecticut. She attended Ridgefield High School. The school is a 20-minute drive from Sandy Hook Elementary School, the site of the 2012 massacre in which 20 children and 6 staff members died.

== National School Walkout conception ==
After the shooting in Parkland, Murdock created a petition on change.org asking people to protest the lack of responses that follow school shootings in America by participating in a walkout. The petition accumulated over 270,000 signatures. Murdock and fellow RHS students then set about organizing their nationwide walk-out with Indivisible.

The NationalSchoolWalkout Twitter account accumulated more than 100,000 followers in five days. National School Walkout scheduled the nationwide walkout to take place on April 20, as it marked the 19th anniversary of the Columbine High school shooting.

The April 20 walkout organized by Murdock was set to last until the end of the school day, because the issue is one that needed to be ‘addressed [for] longer than 17 minutes’. This was said in reference to the March 14 walkout which lasted for 17 minutes to mark the 17 lives lost at the Marjory Stone High School shooting, with students returning to their classrooms soon after.

== Later life ==
Murdock moved to Scotland in 2020, where she studied public relations at Edinburgh Napier University.
