= Parramatta Lanes =

Festival in western Sydney, Australia

- Status: Active
- Genre: Festival
- Frequency: Annually in October
- Location: Parramatta
- Country: Australia
- Inaugurated: 2012
- Previous event: 21–24 October 2026
- Next event: 2027
- Attendance: 387,000 (2026)
- Major events: Food; Music; Art
- Organiser: City of Parramatta
- Website: atparramatta.com/lanes

Parramatta Lanes is a street festival in the western Sydney city of Parramatta in New South Wales, Australia. The event has "Lanes" in its name because it allows attendees to explore food and entertainment options in different streets and lanes of Parramatta.

The event plays into the council's strategy to introduce greater nightlife options in Parramatta.

== History ==
In the mid 2000s, the suburb was not seen as meeting expectations with the council's effort to improve the city being labeled as 'Paris-matta'. Parramatta Lanes had its inaugural event in 2012. At that time, the main events included pop-up shops, cafés, small bars, and gourmet street vendors. There were also live music acts. In 2012 the festival had around 10,000 to 20,000 people attending.

The event had around 70,000 attendees in 2023.

By 2025, the festival had grown immensely, seeing a 180 percent growth in attendance in the past six years. They had 200,000 attendees in 2024. For the 2025 festival, the council had been focusing more on viral food trends found on social media such as TikTok. They also invited influencers to the festival.

Parramatta Lanes marked a record in 2025 by seeing 335,000 people attend the event. Parramatta Lanes broke that record in 2026 by seeing 387,000 people attend the event.

== Funding ==
As of 2026, funding for Parramatta Lanes comes from the NSW Government and the City of Parramatta Council, the NSW Government funds the event through their four-year multi-year funding program led by Create NSW and the Open Streets Program provided by Transport for NSW. The event is also partially funded by the federal government through Creative Australia. A subsidiary of the council titled Lanes Collective has been established to assist with the organisation of this event.

Shortly before the 2025 event, the City of Parramatta received a $350,000 grant from the NSW government to deliver the festival for an additional three years through the Open Streets Program.

== Awards ==
Parramatta Lanes has received two awards. These included:

- the RH Dougherty Award for Innovation in Special Events from Local Government NSW for the 2021 event
- Platinum award for Events Campaign at the 2024 Western Sydney Tourism Awards
