= Laine (disambiguation) =

Laine is a Finnish and Estonian surname and name.

- Laine (band), Estonian band
- Lainé, French surname
- EML Laine, patrol ship of the Estonian Navy
