= Kalmer Lain =

Estonian politician (born 1968)

Kalmer Lain (born 7 June 1968 in Paide) is an Estonian politician. He was the former and mayor of both Jõgeva (2009–2013) and former Tabivere Parish, and a member of the XII Riigikogu representing the Estonian Reform Party.

On November 18, 2014, in connection with the resignation of the mayor of Tartu, Reno Laidre, Lain became a member of the XII Riigikogu.
