= Laner =

Laner is a surname. Notable people with the surname include:

- Alexander Laner (born 1974), German artist
- Brad Laner (born 1966), American musician and record producer
- Edith Laner (1921–2000), British magistrate
- Simon Laner (born 1984), Italian footballer

== See also ==
- Laney (surname)
