= Layne Dalfen =

Canadian dream analyst and author

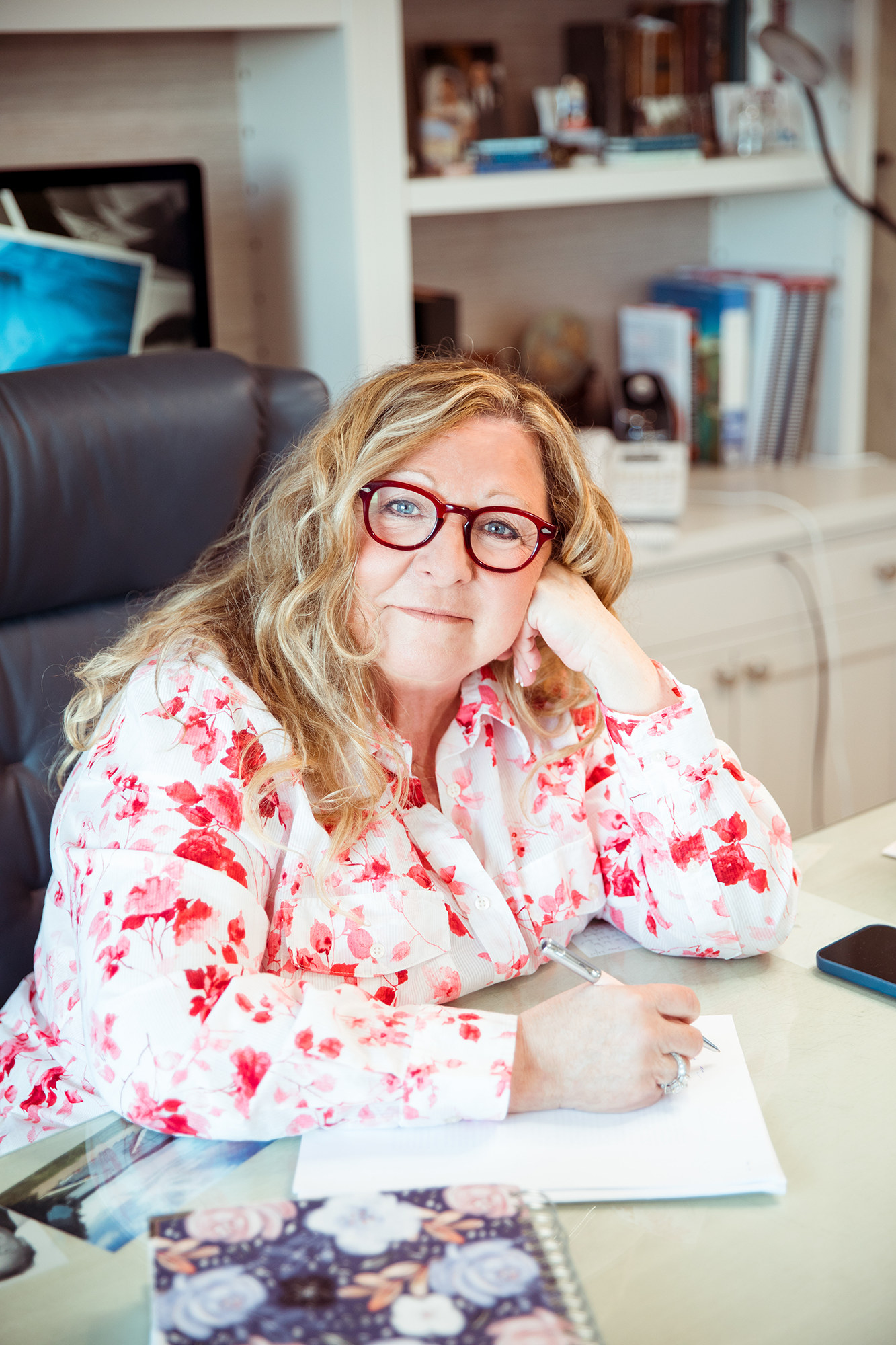
- Born: April 3, 1952 (age 74); Montreal, Canada
- Education: Alfred Adler Institute
- Occupations: Author, dream analyst, speaker, and columnist
- Years active: 1995–present
- Organization(s): Dream Interpretation Center, International Association for the Study of Dreams
- Website: thedreamanalyst.com

Layne Dalfen (IPA: lˈe͡ɪn dˈalfən) (born 1952) is a Canadian dream analyst, columnist, educator, and author recognized for her work in the field of dream interpretation. She is the founder of the Dream Interpretation Center in Montreal and has appeared in numerous media outlets and magazines sharing insights and methods into the science and psychology of dreaming.

== Early life and education ==
Dalfen was born in Canada. At 21 years old she had her first daughter, Tina, who was born with Down syndrome, soon after the reason for which she felt obligated to confront depression and sought professional assistance. She then met a psychiatrist who introduced her to the world of psychotherapy. Dalfen's interest with dreams began during her early experiences with Freudian analysis, where dream interpretation was well-known and widely used as a key therapeutic tool. Later, she earned a certificate in Gestalt Counseling in 1988 and then studied dreamwork at the Alfred Adler Institute working with Dr. Leo Gold in 1992.

== Career ==
Since 1995, she has been a member of the C.G. Jung Society, furthering her expertise in psychological approaches to dreams. Dalfen founded the Dream Interpretation Center in Montreal in 1997, where she provides workshops, private consultations, and lectures with the aim of teaching people how to analyze their dreams from a psychological and therapeutic perspective, frequently with the maxim of "Dreaming is just thinking. There’s always a reason for today’s dream. It’s not random".

She has been a lecturer at Concordia University since 2005, teaching her approach to dream interpretation to the counseling students. Also, she has been an active member of the International Association for the Study of Dreams (IASD), where she was a board member between 2005 and 2009.

Dalfen has also contributed as a consultant for Disney Pixar on the series Dream Productions, which explores the role of dreams in emotional and mental development. The series premiered on Disney+ in December 2024.

== Methods and Approach ==
According to Layne, the unconscious mind is a kind of database or personal storage that holds every memory and association human beings have had throughout their lives. Because of that, Dalfen does not agree with the idea that dreams mean the same thing. In this way, each dream or unconscious mind is as unique as a fingerprint. For her, the dream is an internal conversation that the mind is having with itself about a very specific current issue, which is generally bothering the person while he is awake. Specifically, Dalfen denominates her approach as an "easy-to-grasp method", and it has the principal objective of helping the dreamer uncover the situation about which the dream is addressing or "mirroring" through symbols.

Uncovering unconscious messages is a deliberate process that starts by setting six steps: Feelings, Actions, Play on Words or Puns, Symbols, Plot and Repetition. Each of them forms a larger one that Dalfen calls "Points of Entry". The dream could bring with it different solutions and contexts that reflect reality regarding interpersonal relations and emotional reactions. In this way, they can represent a 'safe place' for the dreamer to practice responses to a given situation.

Finally, the person should be able to understand the next steps, given that the significance or meaning—which inherently includes the solution—has already been revealed. This method aims to be a "problem solving" tool.

== Media and Publications ==
Dalfen has been dedicated as much to writing as to being a columnist on several media. She authors the Understanding Dreams blog on the specialized platform Psychology Today, offering readers tools and advice to "decode" (as she denominates it), and understand the significance of their dreams, she emphasizes the premise that every dream holds a subjective and personal meaning, in her articles she discusses various topics and affairs related to the importance of general dream themes applied to specific contexts, such as dreams about teeth falling out or being attacked by a criminal, she then deduces possible meanings and variables depending on the personal situations, e. g. an internal conflict or doubts about the future.

She is also known as the "Dream Catcher" columnist for Oprah Daily, where she shares insights into dream analysis and its practical applications. In this column she focuses on more specific types of dreams and the possible messages that those images and signals from unconscious mind might be sending to individuals, highlighting benefits they can bring to daily life

Prominent works of her career as an article writer include Problem Solving While You Sleep, and Sexual Dreams, both published in the magazine Body and Soul in the United States.

Dalfen has written two books in the Have a Great Dream series, which focus on teaching readers how to explore their dreams as a path to self-discovery and problem-solving. Among these works are found:

- Dreams Do Come True, 2002
- La solution est dans vos rêves
- Have A Great Dream, Book 1;The Overview, 2018, by Dream Interpretation Center
- Have A Great Dream, Book 2;A Deeper Discussion, 2019, by Dream Interpretation Center

Her media presence includes over 250 radio and television appearances on major networks in Canada and U.S. such as NBC, CBS, ABC, WGN, Body and Soul, Canadian Living, Women's Voices, Inner Self, Ghost Village, Vice, and FOX affiliates, such as Good Day New York or Morning News in Chicago as well as frequent guest spots on Coast to Coast AM, where she discusses her work and experience with dream interpretation. She has also appeared as guest on programs like CJAD in her home-town Montreal, additionally in another major radio services as Bitboard.com, Launch Radio, and MegaPrep, recently, she appeared on The Kate Dalley Show on January 26, 2024.

On television, she appeared on CBS Mornings Plus in New York City, on December 17, 2024, for CBSTV. Her presence stands out on the documentary series Seeing 911, a skeptic's journey into a very real prophecy through Elevator Films for Vision TV in 2009, in Discovery Life Channel's Health on the Line, on CITY TV's Breakfast Television, and CTV's Three Takes. Dalfen participated in The Age of E series on Wisdom TV, also was featured in a documentary titled, Dream Symbols:How To Work With Them for DREAMTIME for the PBS channel.

== See also ==
- International Association for the Study of Dreams
- Dream interpretation
