= Lane, South Dakota =

- Town
- Location in Jerauld County and the state of South Dakota
- Coordinates: 44°04′11″N 98°25′29″W
- Country: United States
- State: South Dakota
- County: Jerauld
- Incorporated: 1907

Area
  - Total: 0.46 sq mi (1.20 km^{2})
  - Land: 0.46 sq mi (1.20 km^{2})
  - Water: 0 sq mi (0.00 km^{2})
- Elevation: 1,375 ft (419 m)

Population (2020)
  - Total: 47
  - Density: 101.1/sq mi (39.04/km^{2})
- Time zone: UTC-6 (Central (CST))
  - Summer (DST): UTC-5 (CDT)
- ZIP code: 57358
- Area code: 605
- FIPS code: 46-35780
- GNIS feature ID: 1267453

Lane is a town in Jerauld County, South Dakota, United States. As of the 2020 census, Lane had a population of 47.

Lane was laid out in 1903, and named in honor of T. W. Lane, an early settler.

According to the United States Census Bureau, the town has a total area of 0.47 square miles (1.22 km^{2}), all land.

== Demographics ==
Historical population
Census	Pop.	Note	%±
1910	294		—
1920	336		14.3%
1930	187		−44.3%
1940	214		14.4%
1950	145		−32.2%
1960	99		−31.7%
1970	94		−5.1%
1980	83		−11.7%
1990	71		−14.5%
2000	59		−16.9%
2010	59		0.0%
2020	47		−20.3%
U.S. Decennial Census

=== 2010 census ===
As of the census of 2010, there were 59 people, 27 households, and 15 families residing in the town. The population density was 125.5 inhabitants per square mile (48.5/km^{2}). There were 37 housing units at an average density of 78.7 per square mile (30.4/km^{2}). The racial makeup of the town was 100.0% White. Hispanic or Latino of any race were 3.4% of the population.

There were 27 households, of which 29.6% had children under the age of 18 living with them, 44.4% were married couples living together, 11.1% had a female householder with no husband present, and 44.4% were non-families. 44.4% of all households were made up of individuals, and 14.8% had someone living alone who was 65 years of age or older. The average household size was 2.19 and the average family size was 3.00.

The median age in the town was 37.6 years. 27.1% of residents were under the age of 18; 5.2% were between the ages of 18 and 24; 27.2% were from 25 to 44; 27.2% were from 45 to 64; and 13.6% were 65 years of age or older. The gender makeup of the town was 54.2% male and 45.8% female.

=== 2000 census ===
As of the census of 2000, there were 59 people, 30 households, and 18 families residing in the town. The population density was 126.3 inhabitants per square mile (48.8/km^{2}). There were 34 housing units at an average density of 72.8 per square mile (28.1/km^{2}). The racial makeup of the town was 96.61% White, and 3.39% from two or more races.

There were 30 households, out of which 20.0% had children under the age of 18 living with them, 43.3% were married couples living together, 20.0% had a female householder with no husband present, and 36.7% were non-families. 33.3% of all households were made up of individuals, and 13.3% had someone living alone who was 65 years of age or older. The average household size was 1.97 and the average family size was 2.42.

In the town, the population was spread out, with 15.3% under the age of 18, 6.8% from 18 to 24, 30.5% from 25 to 44, 27.1% from 45 to 64, and 20.3% who were 65 years of age or older. The median age was 44 years. For every 100 females, there were 110.7 males. For every 100 females age 18 and over, there were 108.3 males.

The median income for a household in the town was $14,464, and the median income for a family was $18,750. Males had a median income of $16,667 versus $15,625 for females. The per capita income for the town was $13,750. There were 8.3% of families and 5.0% of the population living below the poverty line, including 33.3% of under eighteens and none of those over 64.

== Media ==
The area is served by the True Dakotan weekly newspaper.
