= Wessington Springs, South Dakota =

Wessington Springs
- City
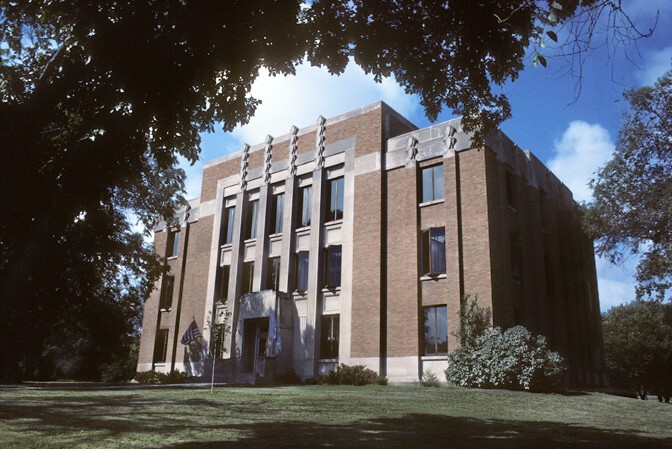
- Jerauld County Courthouse in Wessington Springs

- Location in Jerauld County and the state of South Dakota
- Coordinates: 44°04′50″N 98°34′16″W
- Country: United States
- State: South Dakota
- County: Jerauld
- Incorporated: 1893

Area
  - Total: 1.80 sq mi (4.67 km^{2})
  - Land: 1.80 sq mi (4.67 km^{2})
  - Water: 0 sq mi (0.00 km^{2})
- Elevation: 1,660 ft (510 m)

Population (2020)
  - Total: 771
  - Density: 428.0/sq mi (165.25/km^{2})
- Time zone: UTC-6 (Central (CST))
  - Summer (DST): UTC-5 (CDT)
- ZIP code: 57382
- Area code: 605
- FIPS code: 46-70220
- GNIS feature ID: 1267632
- Website: wessingtonsprings.com

Wessington Springs is a city and the county seat of Jerauld County, South Dakota, United States. As of the 2020 census, Wessington Springs had a population of 771.

== History ==
The Wessington Springs townsite was founded in 1880 and platted in 1882, early in the era of agricultural settlement in the region. The town's boom era began in 1903, when a branch line of the Milwaukee Road railroad was constructed into the town from the east.

The town was the home of Wessington Springs College, an institution of higher learning that existed from 1887 until 1968. There is a baseball field in town that hosts an amateur baseball team named the Wessington Springs Owls.

=== 2014 tornado ===
On June 18, 2014, the town of Wessington Springs was hit by a tornado. At approximately 7:45 PM the tornado tore through the heart of Wessington Springs and 50+ homes were destroyed, and 77 people were left homeless. Many other buildings and properties were damaged significantly. No fatalities were reported but several injuries were sustained. The town's emergency sirens gave residents significant advance notice to the threat, allowing residents to flee to the town's fallout shelter avoiding injury and death. The town was on lockdown for several hours to prevent further injuries and blockages.

== Geography ==
According to the United States Census Bureau, the town has a total area of 1.77 square miles (4.58 km^{2}), all land.

=== Climate ===
Climate data for Wessington Springs, South Dakota (1991−2020 normals, extremes 1893−present)
Month	Jan	Feb	Mar	Apr	May	Jun	Jul	Aug	Sep	Oct	Nov	Dec	Year
Record high °F (°C)	67 (19)	71 (22)	86 (30)	99 (37)	101 (38)	109 (43)	111 (44)	109 (43)	105 (41)	97 (36)	84 (29)	68 (20)	111 (44)
Mean maximum °F (°C)	50.1 (10.1)	55.6 (13.1)	70.4 (21.3)	81.6 (27.6)	88.3 (31.3)	93.2 (34.0)	99.3 (37.4)	97.3 (36.3)	92.6 (33.7)	83.6 (28.7)	68.0 (20.0)	52.7 (11.5)	100.7 (38.2)
Mean daily maximum °F (°C)	25.4 (−3.7)	30.2 (−1.0)	42.3 (5.7)	55.6 (13.1)	67.8 (19.9)	78.1 (25.6)	84.4 (29.1)	82.3 (27.9)	74.2 (23.4)	58.7 (14.8)	43.1 (6.2)	29.7 (−1.3)	56.0 (13.3)
Daily mean °F (°C)	16.2 (−8.8)	20.4 (−6.4)	31.9 (−0.1)	44.4 (6.9)	56.8 (13.8)	67.2 (19.6)	73.0 (22.8)	70.8 (21.6)	62.4 (16.9)	47.7 (8.7)	33.2 (0.7)	20.9 (−6.2)	45.4 (7.4)
Mean daily minimum °F (°C)	7.0 (−13.9)	10.6 (−11.9)	21.6 (−5.8)	33.3 (0.7)	45.9 (7.7)	56.3 (13.5)	61.6 (16.4)	59.4 (15.2)	50.6 (10.3)	36.6 (2.6)	23.4 (−4.8)	12.1 (−11.1)	34.9 (1.6)
Mean minimum °F (°C)	−13.1 (−25.1)	−9.0 (−22.8)	0.8 (−17.3)	19.5 (−6.9)	33.1 (0.6)	46.4 (8.0)	52.4 (11.3)	50.8 (10.4)	37.5 (3.1)	21.6 (−5.8)	6.7 (−14.1)	−7.3 (−21.8)	−16.8 (−27.1)
Record low °F (°C)	−36 (−38)	−39 (−39)	−20 (−29)	1 (−17)	17 (−8)	27 (−3)	43 (6)	23 (−5)	18 (−8)	5 (−15)	−23 (−31)	−27 (−33)	−39 (−39)
Average precipitation inches (mm)	0.64 (16)	0.73 (19)	1.29 (33)	3.02 (77)	3.67 (93)	3.85 (98)	3.09 (78)	2.90 (74)	2.73 (69)	2.09 (53)	0.93 (24)	0.72 (18)	25.66 (652)
Average snowfall inches (cm)	7.5 (19)	7.3 (19)	6.4 (16)	8.2 (21)	0.0 (0.0)	0.0 (0.0)	0.0 (0.0)	0.0 (0.0)	0.0 (0.0)	1.7 (4.3)	5.3 (13)	8.1 (21)	44.5 (113)
Average precipitation days (≥ 0.01 in)	4.8	4.6	5.7	8.4	10.7	11.3	8.0	7.6	7.2	6.7	4.2	4.8	84.0
Average snowy days (≥ 0.1 in)	4.2	3.8	3.0	2.0	0.0	0.0	0.0	0.0	0.0	0.7	2.4	3.9	20.0
Source: NOAA

== Demographics ==
Historical population
Census	Pop.	Note	%±
1900	320		—
1910	1,093		241.6%
1920	1,618		48.0%
1930	1,401		−13.4%
1940	1,352		−3.5%
1950	1,453		7.5%
1960	1,488		2.4%
1970	1,300		−12.6%
1980	1,203		−7.5%
1990	1,083		−10.0%
2000	1,011		−6.6%
2010	956		−5.4%
2020	771		−19.4%
U.S. Decennial Census

=== 2020 census ===
As of the 2020 census, Wessington Springs had a population of 771. The median age was 58.1 years; 18.5% of residents were under the age of 18 and 39.2% of residents were 65 years of age or older. For every 100 females there were 90.8 males, and for every 100 females age 18 and over there were 83.1 males age 18 and over.

0.0% of residents lived in urban areas, while 100.0% lived in rural areas.

There were 385 households in Wessington Springs, of which 17.7% had children under the age of 18 living in them. Of all households, 42.9% were married-couple households, 20.5% were households with a male householder and no spouse or partner present, and 33.2% were households with a female householder and no spouse or partner present. About 47.3% of all households were made up of individuals and 29.1% had someone living alone who was 65 years of age or older.

There were 483 housing units, of which 20.3% were vacant. The homeowner vacancy rate was 3.7% and the rental vacancy rate was 18.2%.

Racial composition as of the 2020 census
Race	Number	Percent
White	745	96.6%
Black or African American	1	0.1%
American Indian and Alaska Native	6	0.8%
Asian	2	0.3%
Native Hawaiian and Other Pacific Islander	0	0.0%
Some other race	1	0.1%
Two or more races	16	2.1%
Hispanic or Latino (of any race)	20	2.6%

=== 2010 census ===
As of the census of 2010, there were 956 people, 465 households, and 266 families residing in the city. The population density was 540.1 inhabitants per square mile (208.5/km^{2}). There were 526 housing units at an average density of 297.2 per square mile (114.7/km^{2}). The racial makeup of the city was 99.0% White, 0.3% Native American, 0.3% Asian, 0.2% from other races, and 0.2% from two or more races. Hispanic or Latino of any race were 0.6% of the population.

There were 465 households, of which 16.3% had children under the age of 18 living with them, 47.3% were married couples living together, 6.9% had a female householder with no husband present, 3.0% had a male householder with no wife present, and 42.8% were non-families. 38.1% of all households were made up of individuals, and 26.2% had someone living alone who was 65 years of age or older. The average household size was 1.97 and the average family size was 2.57.

The median age in the city was 57 years. 16.1% of residents were under the age of 18; 4.4% were between the ages of 18 and 24; 14.7% were from 25 to 44; 27.2% were from 45 to 64; and 37.6% were 65 years of age or older. The gender makeup of the city was 43.4% male and 56.6% female.

=== 2000 census ===
As of the census of 2000, there were 1,011 people, 505 households, and 285 families residing in the city. The population density was 572.9 inhabitants per square mile (221.2/km^{2}). There were 580 housing units at an average density of 328.6 per square mile (126.9/km^{2}). The racial makeup of the city was 99.01% White, 0.40% Native American, 0.20% Asian, and 0.40% from two or more races. Hispanic or Latino of any race were 0.30% of the population.

There were 505 households, out of which 16.4% had children under the age of 18 living with them, 48.3% were married couples living together, 5.3% had a female householder with no husband present, and 43.4% were non-families. 39.6% of all households were made up of individuals, and 26.7% had someone living alone who was 65 years of age or older. The average household size was 1.92 and the average family size was 2.50.

In the city, the population was spread out, with 15.4% under the age of 18, 5.1% from 18 to 24, 15.6% from 25 to 44, 23.3% from 45 to 64, and 40.5% who were 65 years of age or older. The median age was 55 years. For every 100 females, there were 82.2 males. For every 100 females age 18 and over, there were 79.2 males.

The median income for a household in the city was $31,736, and the median income for a family was $40,962. Males had a median income of $28,929 versus $18,333 for females. The per capita income for the city was $23,108. About 3.4% of families and 7.2% of the population were below the poverty line, including 11.0% of those under age 18 and 8.1% of those age 65 or over.

== Media ==
The area is served by the True Dakotan weekly newspaper.

== Notable people ==
- Emma Louise Lowe - Musician, educator, former First Lady of American Samoa and former First Lady of Guam
- David Everett Rumelhart - Pioneer in the field of machine learning
- Robert Vessey, seventh Governor of South Dakota

== See also ==
- List of cities in South Dakota
- Perkins & McWayne
