= Lane (surname) =

Lane is a surname with several origins.

== Meanings and origins ==
- From Middle English a topographic name for someone who lived on a lane, used to denote any narrow pathway, including one between houses in a town. A Norman or Breton origin has also been proposed for some people bearing this surname, derived from L'Asne, itself perhaps coming from a nickname such as le Asinus (the Ass) or from a toponym in Normandy or Brittany.

A prominent Lane family documented in Staffordshire claim to have Norman ancestry, and list the earliest ancestor as "Adam de Lone" living in 1315. Lane families enjoyed prominence in other counties such as Kent, Gloucestershire, Buckinghamshire, and Northamptonshire where Sir Ralph Lane is theorized to have originated. A knighted Sir Richard Lane is found in Northamptonshire in the early 1600s.

Tax lists of Buckinghamshire in 1400s list "John atte Lane" and "William atte Lane" with the Saxon term "atte" being the same as the French term "de la", showing topographic reference.

Lane families took part in the Plantations of Ireland as it is theorized Sir George Lane was part of the same family as Sir Ralph Lane.

In 1663, a Matthys Laenen Van Pelt emigrated from Amsterdam to New Jersey. The family appears to have shortened the name to Lane after arriving.

Early Virginia County Tax lists of the late 1700s show Lane families with the spellings of "Lane", "Lain", and "Layne" but with no indication of importance for the different spellings, other than possible separation of unrelated Lane families. By the middle 1800s though, "Lane" was commonly adopted.

Lane is also an Anglicized form, of three Irish Gaelic surnames, however, no evidence showing the following words being used as "Lane" can be found.

- Ó Laighin ‘descendant of Laighean’, a byname meaning ‘spear’, or ‘javelin'.
- Ó Luain ‘descendant of Luan’, a byname meaning ‘warrior’.
- Ó Liatháin.

== A ==
- Abbe Lane (1932–2026), American actress
- Abigail Lane (born 1967), English artist
- Alan Lane (disambiguation), multiple people
- Alex Lane (born 1995), English badminton player
- Alexander Lane (1857–1911), American physician and politician
- Allen Lane (1902–1970), publisher
- Alycia Lane (born 1972), American television journalist
- Amanda Lane Root (1839–1918), American social reformer
- Andrew Lane (disambiguation), several people
- Andy Lane (born 1963), author and journalist
- Anita Lane (1959–2021), Australian singer and songwriter
- Anthony John Lane (1920 –1942), Australian private who was killed in the Ration Truck massacre
- Anthony Lane (born 1962), British film reviewer and journalist
- Arthur Bliss Lane (1894–1956), U.S. diplomat

== B ==
- Barry Lane (1960–2022), English golfer
- Barry Lane (1932–2022), British Army officer
- Bettye Lane (1930–2012), American photojournalist
- Bill Lane (baseball), American baseball player
- Bill Lane (1922–2000), Australian amateur ornithologist
- Bill Lane (publisher) (1919–2010), American magazine publisher, diplomat, and philanthropist
- Billy Lane (born 1970), U.S. motorcycle builder
- Bobby Lane (born 1939), American football player
- Brendan Lane (disambiguation)
- Brian Lane (RAF officer) (1917–1942), Second World War Royal Air Force fighter pilot and ace
- Burton Lane (1912–1997), U.S. composer and lyricist

== C ==
- Calah Lane (born 2009), American actress and singer
- Carla Lane (1937–2016), pseudonym of Romana Barrack, a British television writer
- Charles Lane (disambiguation)
- Colin Lane (born 1965), Australian comedian

== D ==
- David Lane (disambiguation), several people
- Denny Lane (1818–1895), Irish businessman and nationalist public figure
- Devinn Lane (born 1972), American pornographic actress
- Diane Lane (born 1965), U.S. actress
- Dick Lane (1936–2002), scholar, author, collector, and dealer of Japanese art
- Dick Lane (American football) (1928–2002), American football player
- Dick Lane (baseball) (1927–2018), U.S. baseball player
- Dick Lane (TV announcer) (1899–1982), television announcer
- Don Lane (1933–2009), talk show host

== E ==
- Eastwood Lane (1879–1951), U.S. composer
- Ebenezer D. Lane (1814–1879), American ship captain
- Edgar Lane (1923–1964), American professor of political science
- Edward William Lane (1801–1876), British scholar
- Elizabeth Lane (1905–1988), British lawyer
- Ernest Preston Lane (1886–1969), American mathematician

== F ==
- Fitz Hugh Lane (1804–1865), U.S. painter
- Frank Lane (1896–1981), U.S. baseball executive
- Franklin Knight Lane (1864–1921), Canadian-American politician
- Fred Lane (American football) (1975–2000), American football player
- Frederic C. Lane (1900–1984), U.S. historian
- Frederick Lane (1888–1969), Australian swimmer

== G ==
- Gary Lane (chess player) (born 1964), professional chess player and author
- Gary Lane (gridiron football) (1942–2003), American football quarterback and American football official
- Gary Lane (politician) (born 1942), Canadian politician and Saskatchewan MLA
- Geoffrey Lane, Baron Lane (1918–2005), British Judge
- George Martin Lane (1823–1897), U.S. scholar
- George Lane (politician) (1856–1925), Canadian politician and rancher
- Gertrude Lane (d. 1953), American trade unionist
- Gertrude Battles Lane (1874–1941), American editor
- Gord Lane (born 1953), Canadian ice hockey player

== H ==
- Harlan Lane (1936–2019), American professor of psychology and linguistics, Northeastern University, Boston
- Harriet Lane (1830–1903), United States President James Buchanan's niece
- Harry Lane (1855–1917), American politician
- Hester Lane (died 1849), American abolitionist
- Homer Lane (1875–1925), American educator
- Hugh Lane (1875–1915), Irish (Irish-British) art collector and philanthropist

== I ==
- Isaac Lane (1834–1937), African American bishop and educator
- Isaac Lane (baseball) (1888–1979), African American baseball player

== J ==
- J. Michael Lane (1936–2020), American epidemiologist
- Jackie Lane (actress) (1941–2021), British actress
- Ja'Kobi Lane (born 2004), American football player
- James D. Lane (born 1965), American electric blues guitarist
- James Franklin Lane (1874–1944), African American educator and college president
- James Henry Lane (Union general) (1814–1866), U.S. abolitionist, Senator, and general
- James Henry Lane (Confederate general) (1833–1907), Confederate general
- Jane Lane (author) (1905–1978), British historical novelist
- Jani Lane (1964–2011), U.S. singer (Warrant)
- Jason Lane (born 1976), American professional baseball player
- Jay Lane (born 1964), American drummer
- Jaylin Lane (born 2002), American football player
- Jeffrey Lane, film producer and actor
- Jim Lane (Irish republican) (1938–2026), Irish republican and socialist
- Jocelyn Lane (born 1937), model, actress and jewellery designer
- John Lane (publisher) (1854–1925), British publisher
- John Carey Lane (1872–1958), Mayor of Honolulu
- Jonathan Homer Lane (1819–1880), American astrophysicist and inventor
- Joseph Lane (1801–1881), U.S. general and politician
- Joseph Lane (1851–1920), English socialist
- Julia Lane, New Zealand, British, and American economist and economic statistician

== K ==
- Katharine Lane Weems, American painter
- Kenneth Lane (disambiguation), multiple people
- Kris Lane (born 1967), professor of Latin American history

== L ==
- Lafayette Lane (1842–1896), U.S. politician
- Lana Lane, American rock singer
- Larry Lane, an alias of Finnish soldier Lauri Törni (1919–1965)
- Lauren Lane (born 1961), U.S. actress
- Lawrence Lane (born 1952), theatrical producer
- Layle Lane, American educator and activist
- Lenny Lane (born 1970), U.S. professional wrestler, real name Leonard Carlson
- Leone Lane, American actress
- Leota Lane (1913–1963), U.S. actress, one of the Lane Sisters
- Lexi Lane, former ring name of Madison Rayne, American wrestler
- Lisa Lane (born 1938), U.S. chess player
- Lola Lane (1906–1981), U.S. actress, one of the Lane Sisters
- Lunsford Lane (1803–1879), ex-slave
- Lupino Lane (1892–1959), English actor
- Lyle Franklin Lane (1926–2013), U.S. Diplomat

== M ==
- Margaret Lane (1907–1994), British journalist, biographer and novelist
- Mark Lane (disambiguation), multiple people
- Martin Lane (born 1961), English footballer
- Mary Lane, American writer and journalist
- Matteo Lane (born 1982), U.S. comedian
- Melissa Lane, American academic
- Mills Lane (1937–2022), U.S. judge and boxing referee
- Morgan D. Lane (1844–1892), American Civil War Medal of Honor recipient

== N ==
- Nancy Lane (born 1971), Australian chess player
- Nancy E. Lane, American rheumatologist
- Nancy Lane Perham (1936–2025), Canadian cell biologist and academic
- Nathan Lane (born 1956), American actor
- Nathan E. Lane (1862–1948), American politician, member of the Wisconsin State Assembly
- Nicholas Lane (c. 1585–1644), English surveyor and cartographer
- Nick Lane (born 1967), British biochemist and writer

== P ==
- Paddy Lane (1939–2002), Irish MEP and rugbyman
- Patrick Lane (1939–2019), Canadian poet
- Philip Lane (disambiguation)
- Priscilla Lane (1915–1995), U.S. actress one of the Lane Sisters

== R ==
- Ralph Lane (c. 1530–1603), English explorer
- Rayuan Lane III (born 2003), American football player
- Red Lane (1939–2015), stage name of Hollis Rudolph DeLaughter, American singer-songwriter
- Richard Lane (disambiguation)
- Robert Lane (disambiguation)
- Ronnie Lane (1946–1997), British singer and songwriter
- Rose Wilder Lane (1886–1968), American writer
- Rosemary Lane (1914–1974), one of the American Lane Sisters
- Roy Lane (c. 1935–2009), British racing driver
- Ryan Lane (born 1987), American actor and model

== S ==
- Saffron Lane (born 1995), English ice hockey player
- Sam Lane (rugby player) (born 1991), rugby union footballer
- Samantha Lane (born 1979), Australian AFL writer
- Samantha Lane (born 2012), Australian sports writer
- Sara Malakul Lane (born 1983), Thai actress and model
- Sarah Lane (born 1984), American ballet dancer
- Selwyn George (Bill) Lane (1922–2000), Australian ornithologist
- Shawn Lane (1963–2003), U.S. musician (Black Oak Arkansas)
- Sidney W. Lane (died 1906), American politician from Maryland
- Simon Lane (born 1978), British YouTuber and Yogscast co-founder
- Stan Lane (born 1953), U.S. professional wrestler
- Stanley Lane-Poole (1854–1931), British orientalist

== T ==
- Tami Lane (born 1974), American makeup artist
- Terry Lane (born 1939), Australian radio broadcaster and newspaper columnist
- Thomas Lane (disambiguation)
- Tim Lane (disambiguation)
- Trevor Lane (born 1994), American professional baseball player

== W ==
- Walter Lane (disambiguation), multiple people
- Warren L. Lane (1805–1861), American politician
- William Lane (disambiguation), multiple people

== Fictional characters ==
- Solomon Lane, in the film Mission: Impossible – Rogue Nation
- Drury Lane (character), a detective created by Ellery Queen
- Gerry, Karin, Constance & Rachel Lane, in the 2013 film World War Z
- Jane Lane (Daria), in the animated series Daria
- Lois Lane, DC Comics character
- Lucy Lane, DC Comics character Lois' sister
- Sam Lane (character), DC Comics character Lois and Lucy's father
- Brian Lane (New Tricks), in the drama series New Tricks
- Margo Lane, in The Shadow radio drama and pulp novels
- Lane Alexander, a recurring character from the Nickelodeon TV show Victorious

== See also ==
- Lane, division of the carriageway within a road designated to be used by a single line of vehicles
- Laine, surname list
- Layne, name list
- Lyne (surname)
- Lynes (disambiguation)
- Lehane, surname list
