= Dick Lane =

Dick Lane may refer to:

== Sportspeople ==
- Night Train Lane (1927–2002), American football player
- Dick Lane (baseball) (1927–2018), American baseball player
- Dick Lane (pool player), pocket billiards player

== Other people ==
- Richard Douglas Lane (1936–2002), known as Dick Lane, scholar, author, collector and dealer in Japanese art
- Dick Lane (announcer) (1899–1982), television announcer
- Dick Lane (American politician) (1927–2015)

== See also ==
- Dick Lane Velodrome, Atlanta
- Richard Lane (disambiguation)
