= Tim Lane =

Tim Lane may refer to:

- Tim Lane (journalist) (born 1951), Australian journalist and sports commentator
- Tim Lane (rugby union) (born 1959), Australian rugby union coach and player
- Tim Lane (Australian rules footballer) (1888–?), Australian rules footballer
- Tim Lane (executive), American business executive
