= Richard Lane =

Dick or Richard Lane may refer to:

== Artists and writers ==
- Richard Lane (architect) (1795–1880), English co-founder of Manchester Architectural Society
- Richard James Lane (1800–1872), English sculptor and lithographer
- Richard Lane (writer) (1918–2008), Australian radio and television scenarist
- Richard Douglas Lane (1936–2002), American scholar of Japanese art, a/k/a Dick Lane

== Noblemen and public officials ==
- Richard Lane (MP) (before 1410–1438), English MP for Staffordshire (UK Parliament constituency)
- Richard Lane (barrister) (1584–1650), Lord Keeper of Great Seal of England
- Sir Richard Lane, 1st Baronet (before 1620–1668), English nobleman (Lane baronets)
- Sir Richard Lane (politician) (c.1667–1756), English MP and merchant
- Dick Lane (politician) (1927–2015), American member of Georgia House of Representatives

== Sportsmen ==
- Richard Lane (cricketer) (1794–1870), English amateur with Marylebone Club
- Dick "Night Train" Lane (1927–2002), American football player
- Dick Lane (baseball) (1927–2018), American outfielder
- Dick Lane (pool player), American pocket billiards player since 1970s
- Richard Lane (rugby union) (born 1993), English wing and fullback

== Others ==
- Richard Lane-Poole (1883–1971), British senior officer in Royal Navy
- Richard Lane (announcer) (1899–1982), American actor

== See also ==
- Dick Lane Velodrome, American bicycle racing facility
