= United States Army Signal Corps =

U.S. Army's branch for communications and information systems

- U.S. Army Signal Corps coat of arms
- Active: 3 March 1863 – present
- Country: United States
- Branch: United States Army
- Garrison/HQ: Fort Gordon, Georgia, United States
- Mottos: Pro Patria Vigilans (English: Watchful for the Country)
- Corps colors: Orange and white
- Anniversaries: 21 June 1860
- Engagements: American Civil War; Indian Wars; Spanish–American War; Philippine–American War; World War I (Occupation); World War II; Korean War; Vietnam War; Operation Desert Storm; Operation Enduring Freedom; Operation Iraqi Freedom; Operation Inherent Resolve

Commanders
- 44th Chief of Signal and Signal School Commandant: Colonel Bernard Brogan
- 26th Regimental Command Sergeant Major: Command Sgt. Maj. Lisa M. Gandy
- Notable commanders: BG Albert J. Myer; BG Adolphus Greely

Insignia
- Branch insignia

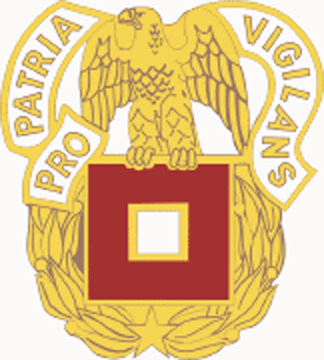
- Regimental insignia

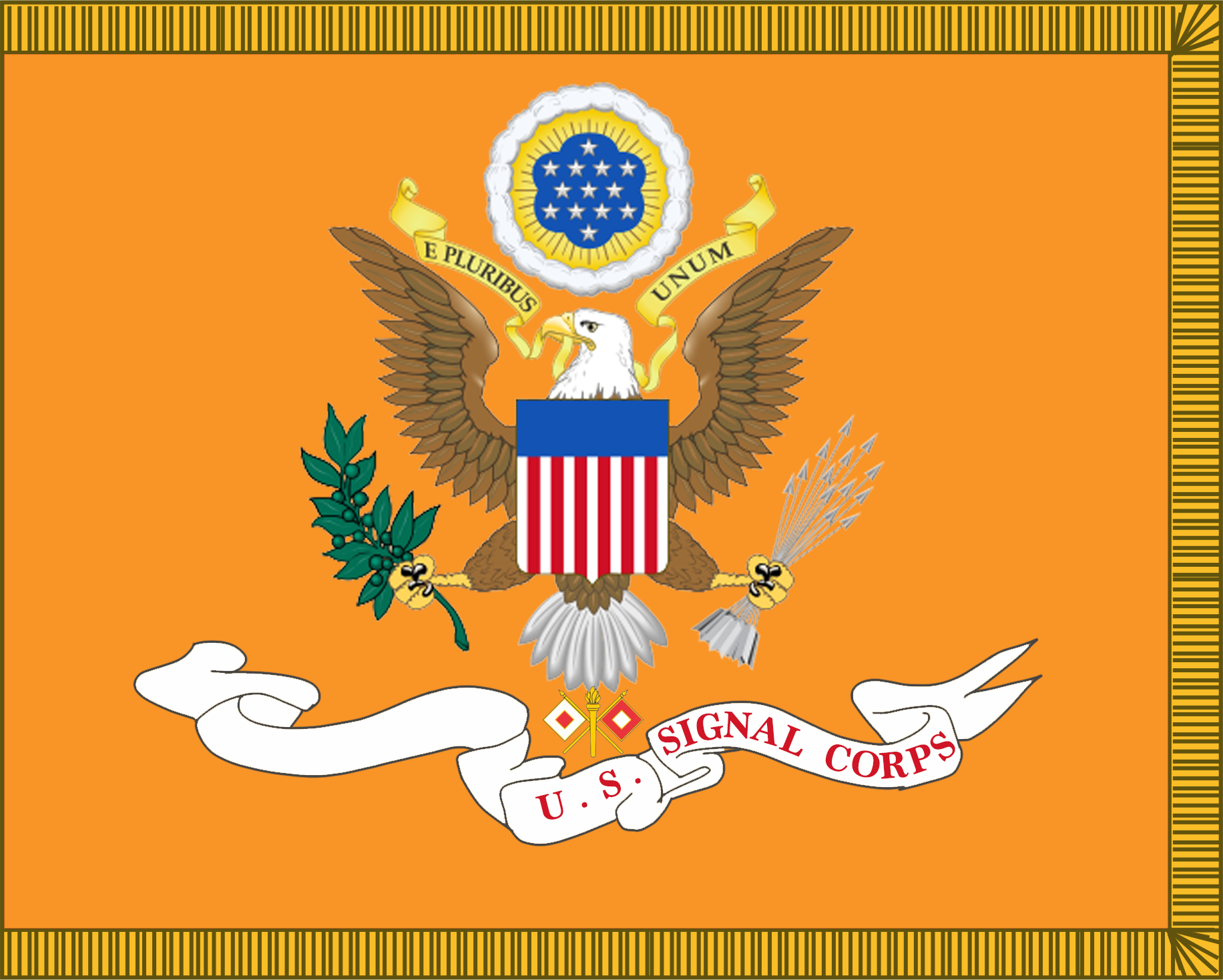
- US Army Signal Corps Standard c. 1917

The United States Army Signal Corps (USASC) is a branch of the United States Army responsible for establishing and managing the communication and information systems for the command and control of the combined arms forces. The USASC manages new technologies and capability portfolios, which are in turn transferred to other U.S. government entities. The branch's responsibilities include military intelligence, meteorological forecasting, and aviation.

== Mission statement ==
The USASC supports command and control across combined arms forces. Its network operations include information assurance, information dissemination management, network management information, and management of the electromagnetic spectrum. This includes designing and installing data communications networks using single- and multichannel satellite, tropospheric scatter, terrestrial microwave switching, messaging, video teleconferencing, and visual information systems. The USASC integrates base communications and information processing management systems into a global information network intended to provide army, coalition, and joint operations with what the military calls, "knowledge dominance."

== History ==
=== Early history ===
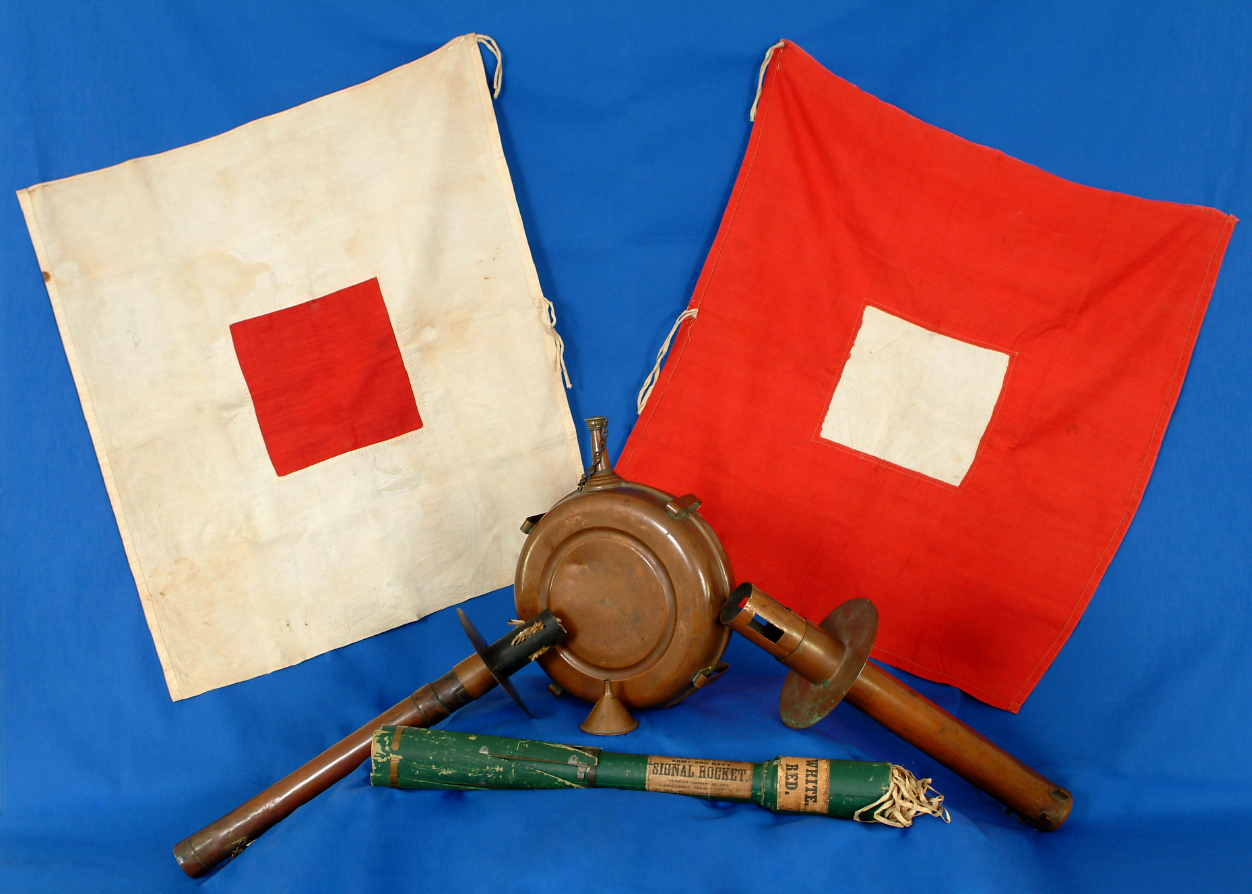
Standard Issue Civil War Signal Corps Kit, complete with flags and torches.

While serving as a medical officer in Texas in 1856, Chief Signal Officer Albert James Myer proposed that the Army use wigwag (or aerial telegraphy), a visual communications system that he developed for signaling. When the Army adopted his system on 21 June 1860, the USASC was created with Myer as the first and only Chief Signal Officer.

Myer's first assignment in his new position was in the early 1860s as part of the Navajo expedition in New Mexico. In June 1861, Myer's system was used to direct the fire of a harbor battery at Fort Wool against the Confederate positions opposite Fort Monroe during the Civil War. Flags were used for daytime signaling, while torches were used at night.

US Signal Corps Kepi Cap badge

Until 1863, Myer relied mostly on detailed personnel. Then, on 3 March 1863, the USASC was authorized as a separate branch of the Army by an Act of Congress (Public Law No. 58 Article VIII, Section 17 and 18).

Myer's Civil War innovations included an unsuccessful balloon experiment at First Bull Run and, in response to McClellan's desire for a Signal Corps field telegraph train, an electric telegraph in the form of the Beardslee telegraph machine. During the Civil War, Wigwag began to be replaced with electric telegraph, bypassing line-of-sight restrictions.

Myer used his office in downtown Washington, D.C. to temporarily house the Signal Corps School. The location was later moved to Fort Greble, one of the Defenses of Washington during the Civil War, and then again moved to Fort Whipple, where the school remained for over 20 years and was ultimately renamed Fort Myer.

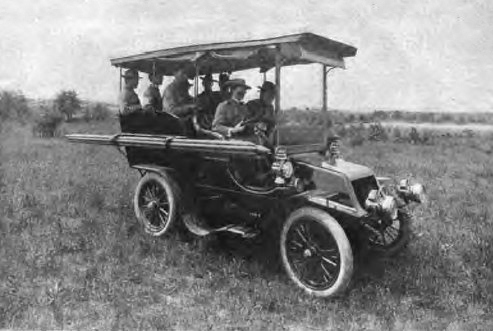
US Army Signal Corps automobile at the Manassas maneuvers in 1904

Signal Corps detachments participated in campaigns fighting Native Americans in the west, such as the Powder River Expedition of 1865.

In July 1866, Congress decided that there should be at minimum a cadre of Signal Officers, even in peacetime. It then provided one Chief Signal Officer of the Army, with the rank of Colonel. Six additional officers and 100 men were chosen from the Corps of Engineers for the Signal Corps.

The electric telegraph, in addition to visual signaling, became a USASC responsibility in 1867. Within 12 years, the Signal Corps had constructed, maintained and operated 4,000 miles of telegraph lines along the nation's western frontier.

In 1870, the Signal Corps established the Congressionally-mandated national weather service. Within a decade, with the assistance of Lieutenant Adolphus Greely, Myer commanded the weather service until his death in 1880. The Weather Bureau became part of the U.S. Department of Agriculture in 1891 and the corps retained responsibility for military meteorology.

In 1881, the Signal Corps participated in the First International Polar Year. One of the groups commanded by Lieutenant Greely became separated from their base camp and were marooned on an ice floe. Due to starvation and drowning, only seven of the original 25 volunteers survived, which meant a 28% chance of surviving.

The Signal Corps aided in the Spanish–American War of 1898 and the subsequent Philippine Insurrection. In addition to visual signaling, including heliography, the corps supplied telephone and telegraph wire lines, cable communications, enabled the use of telephones in combat, conducted combat photography, and renewed the use of balloons. Shortly after the war, the Signal Corps constructed the Washington-Alaska Military Cable and Telegraph System (WAMCATS), also known as the Alaska Communications System (ACS). Contemporary accounts described this as among the first wireless telegraph systems in the Western Hemisphere.

In October 1903, Congress directed then Chief Signal Officer Brigadier General Adolphus Greely to issue an order. In October 1904, Congress appropriated $25,000 for the Signal Corps to "build a flying machine for war purposes" directing Chief Signal Officer Brigadier General Adolphus Greely to oversee the effort. Chief Signal Officer Brigadier General Adolphus Greely thus contracted the Wright brothers in 1908 to build and demonstrate a military airplane; the Wrights conducted their trials at Fort Myer, Virginia. Their historic first powered flight had taken place at Kitty Hawk, North Carolina, in December 1903.

=== World War I ===
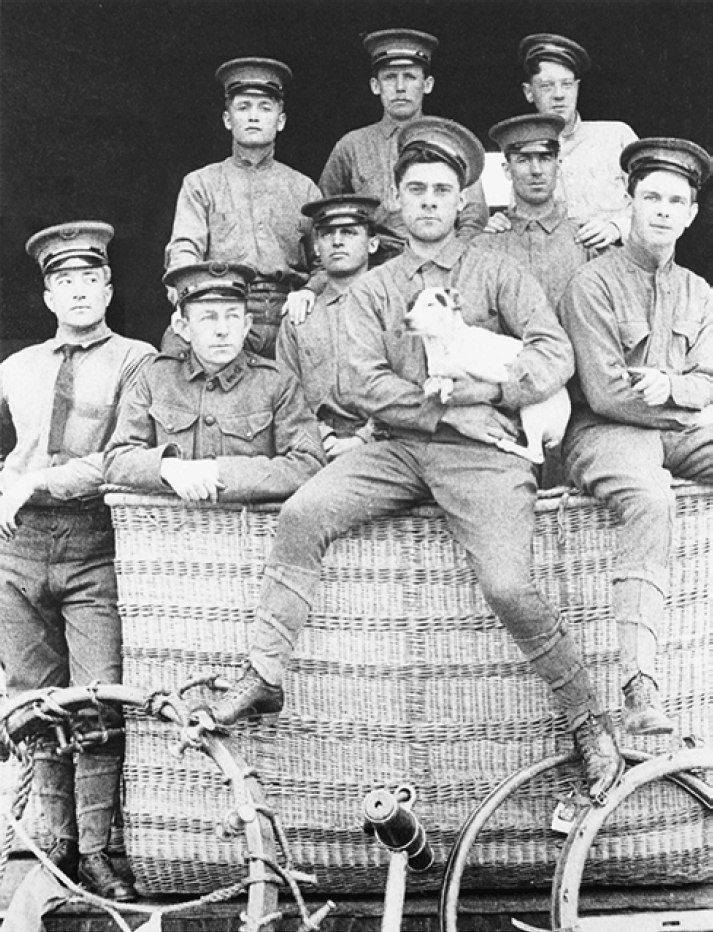
First military assigned to the Army Signal Corps' ballooning program

On August 1, 1907, an Aeronautical Division was established under the Office of the Chief Signal Officer (OCSO). In 1908, in Fort Myer, Virginia, the Wright brothers conducted test flights of the Army's first airplane built to Signal Corps' specifications. Reflecting the need for an official pilot rating, War Department Bulletin No. 2, released on 24 February 1911, established a "Military Aviator" rating. Army aviation remained within the Signal Corps until 1918, when it became the Army Air Service.

During World War I, Chief Signal Officer George Owen Squier worked closely with private industries to perfect radio tubes while creating a major signal laboratory at Camp Alfred Vail (later Fort Monmouth). Early radiotelephones developed by the Signal Corps were introduced into the European theatre in 1918. While the new American voice radios were of higher quality than the radiotelegraph sets, the telephone and telegraph remained the major communication technology of World War I.

Also during World War I, women switchboard operators, known as the "Hello Girls," were sworn into the Signal Corps. Despite the fact that they wore U.S. Army uniforms and were subject to Army regulations (Chief Operator Grace Banker received the Distinguished Service Medal), they were not given honorable discharges but were considered "civilians" employed by the military, because Army regulations specified the male gender. Not until 1978—the 60th anniversary of the end of World War I—did Congress approve veteran status/honorable discharges for the surviving "Hello Girls."

A pioneer in radar, Colonel William Blair, director of the Signal Corps laboratories at Fort Monmouth, demonstrated the SCR-268 prototype in May 1937. Before the United States entered World War II, mass production of two radar sets, the SCR (Signal Corps Radio)-268 and the SCR-270, had begun.

=== World War II ===
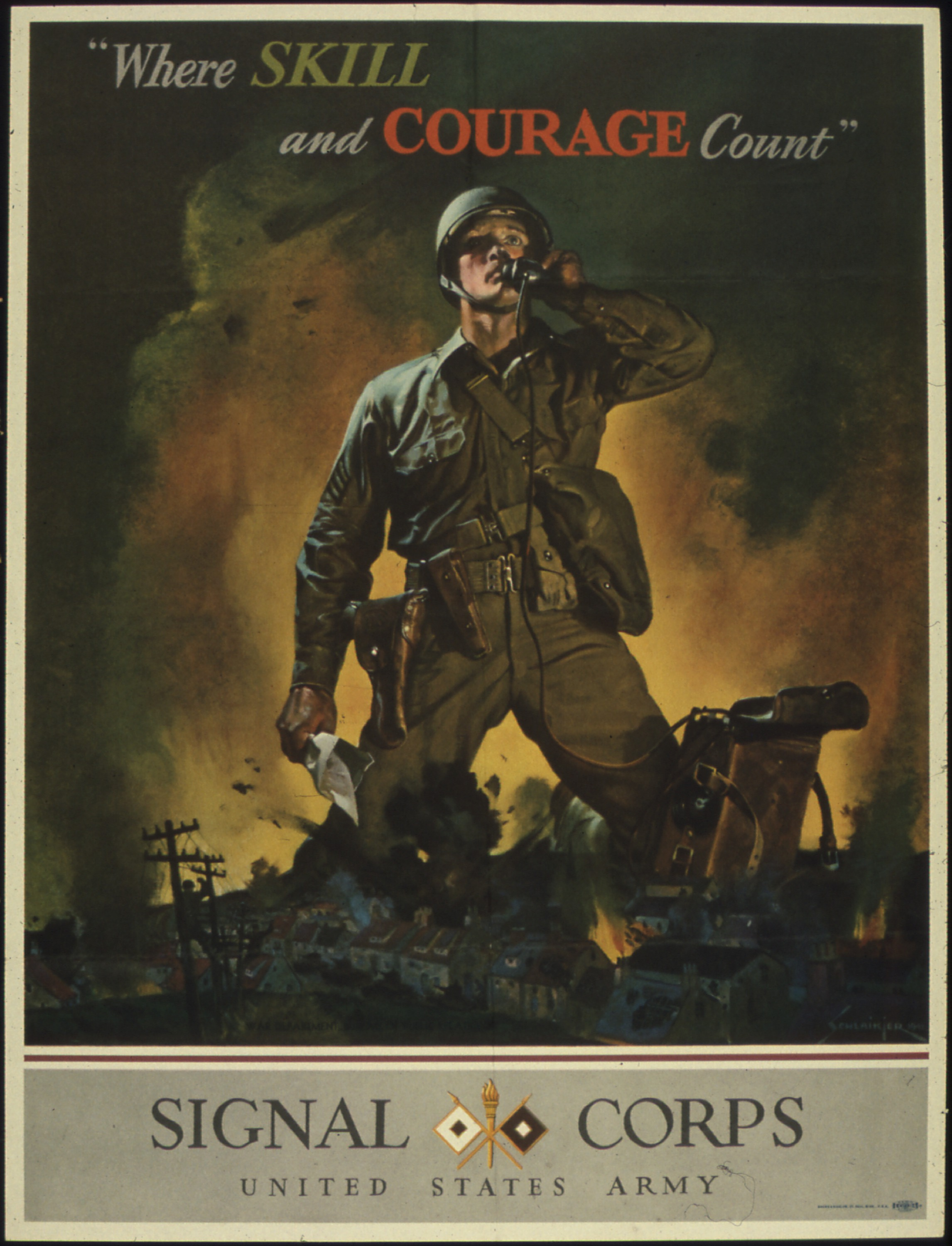
World War II recruitment poster (1942)

World War II signal corps reenactment

When the War Department was reorganized on 9 March 1942, the Signal Corps became one of the technical services in the Services of Supply (later Army Service Forces). Its organized components served both the Army Ground Forces and the Army Air Forces.

The Army Chief Signal Officer (CSO) was responsible for establishing and maintaining communications service schools for officers and enlisted soldiers, ranging in qualifications from those holding doctorates to functional illiterates. The single prewar Signal Corps training site was Fort Monmouth, New Jersey. To keep up with the demand for more signalers, the CSO opened more training facilities: Camp Crowder, Missouri; Camp Kohler, California; and Camp Murphy, Florida.

The Eastern Signal Corps Training Center at Fort Monmouth consisted of an officers' school, an officer candidate school, an enlisted school and a basic training center at sub post Camp Wood. The officer candidate school operated from 1941 to 1946 and graduated 21,033 Signal Corps second lieutenants.

The term "RADAR" was coined by the Navy in 1940 and agreed to by the Army in 1941. The first Signal Corps Field Manual on Aircraft Warning Service defined RADAR as "a term used to designate radio sets SCR-268 and SCR-270 and similar equipment". The SCR-268 and SCR-270 were not radios at all, but were designated as such to keep their actual function secret. Although important offensive applications have since been developed, radar emerged historically from the defensive need to counter the possibility of massive aerial bombardment.

In 1941, the laboratories at Fort Monmouth developed the SCR-300, the first FM backpack radio. Its frequency modulation circuits provided front-line troops with reliable, static-free communications. The labs also fielded multichannel FM radio relay sets (e.g., AN/TRC-1) in the European Theater of Operations as early as 1943. Multichannel radio broadcasting allowed several channels of communications to be broadcast over a single radio signal, increasing security and range and relieving frequency spectrum crowding.

In December 1942, the War Department directed the Signal Corps General Development Laboratories and the Camp Evans Signal Lab to combine into the Signal Corps Ground Service (SCGS) with headquarters at Bradley Beach, New Jersey (Hotel Grossman). The department also directed the Signal Corps Ground Service to reduce its workforce from 14,518 to 8,879 personnel by August 1943. In June 1944, "Signees", former Italian prisoners of war, arrived at Fort Monmouth to perform housekeeping duties. A lieutenant colonel and 500 enlisted men became hospital, mess, and repair shop attendants, relieving American soldiers from these duties.

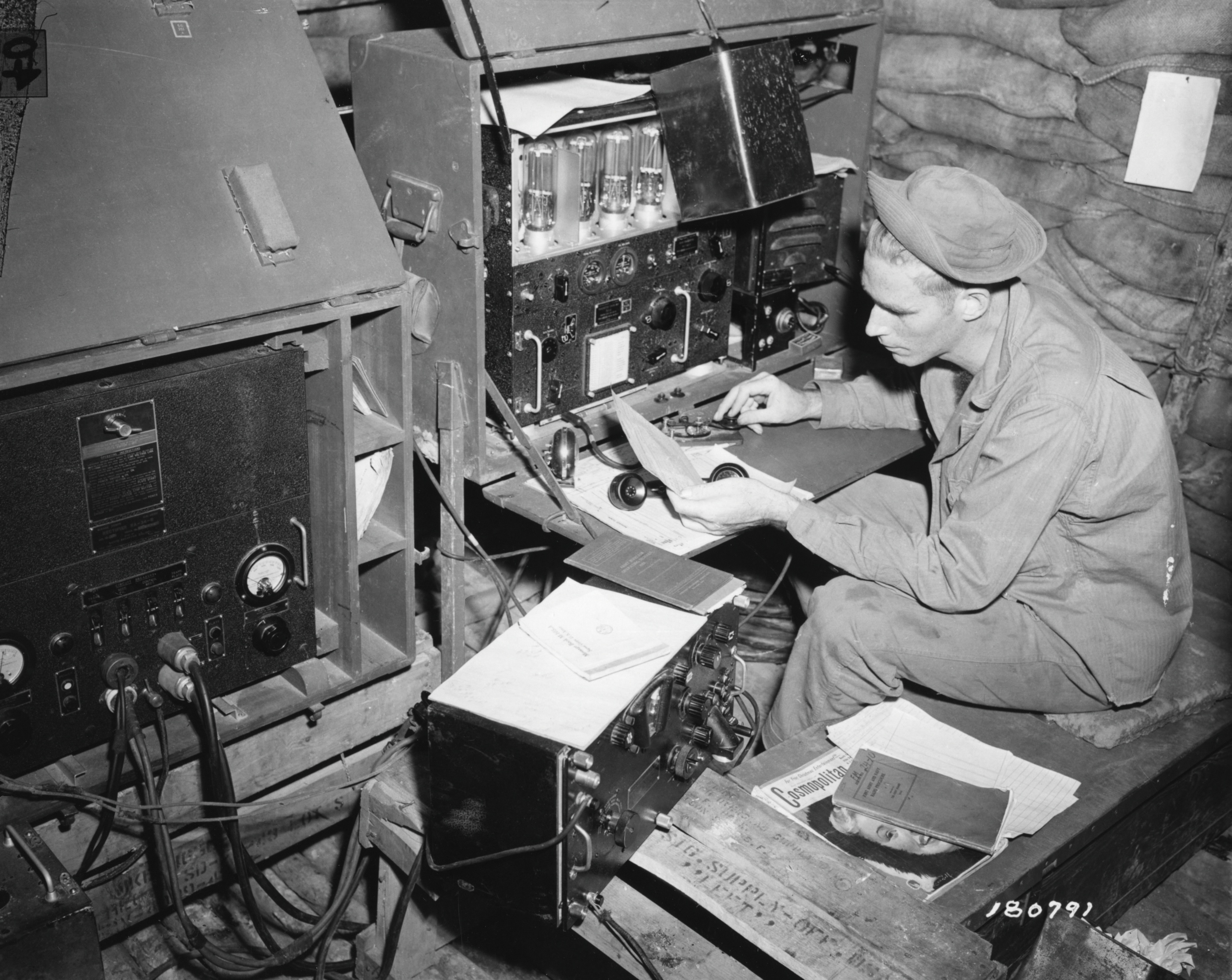
Radio operator Cpl. John Robbins, 41st Signal, 41st Infantry Division, operating his SCR-188 in a sandbagged hut at Station NYU. Dobodura, New Guinea on 9 May 1943.

One of the more unusual units of the Signal Corps were the joint assault signal companies (JASCOs). These companies were Signal Corps units that were made up of several hundred Army, Air Corps, and United States Navy communications specialists specially trained to link land, sea and air operational elements. They saw combat throughout the Pacific and European theaters during World War II in late 1943. JASCOs were much larger than normal signal companies. The joint assault signal companies were the predecessor to the Air Naval Gunfire Liaison Company that exists today. JASCOs represented one of many unprecedented Signal Corps' activities in the Pacific theater. Shipboard fighting was a new kind of combat for Signal Corps soldiers. Army communicators sometimes plied their trade aboard Navy and civilian ships. Signal Corps personnel also served on Army communications ships.

In particular, the Southwest Pacific Area (SWPA) formed a fleet, unofficially known as the "Catboat Flotilla" and formally as the CP fleet, that served as command and communication vessels during amphibious operations, starting with two Australian schooners Harold and Argosy Lemal acquired by the Army and converted during the first half of 1943 by Australian firms into communications ships with AWA radio sets built by Amalgamated Wireless of Australia installed. These initial vessels were joined by Geoanna, Volador and later by a more capable fleet as described in The Signal Corps: The Outcome (Mid-1943 Through 1945):

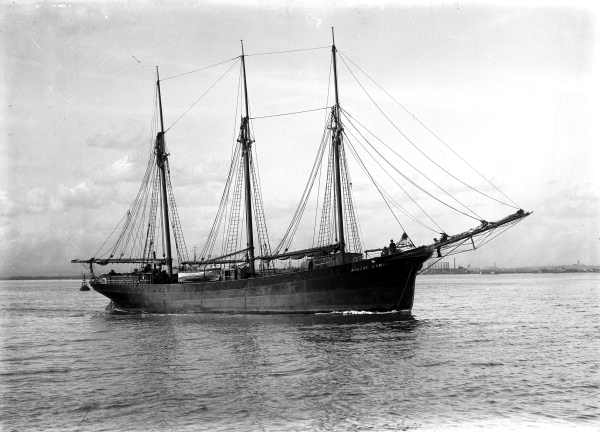
Argosy Lemal c. 1940, one of two Australian vessels acquired by the SWPA chief signal officer for the SWPA CP fleet.

The first task was to obtain ships more suitable than the Harold or the Argosy. Such a ship was the passenger freighter FP-47, acquired by Signal Corps in March 1944, at Sydney. The Army had built her in the United States in 1942. The vessel was 114 feet (35 m) long with a broad beam and a displacement of 370 tons. She was intended for use in the Aleutians. Instead she had sailed to Australia as a tug. The Signal Corps fitted her with Australian transmitters and receivers, also with an SCR-300 walkie-talkie, two SCR-808's, and an SCR-608, plus power equipment, antennas, and, finally, quarters for the Signal Corps operators. The Australian sets were intended for long-range CW signals operating in the high frequencies; the SCRs were short-range VHF FM radios for use in the fleet net and for ship-to-shore channels. Armed with antiaircraft weapons and machine guns (served by 12 enlisted men of the Army ship and gun crews), navigated by a crew of 6 Army Transport Service officers and the 12 men already mentioned, the FP-47 was ready for service in June. Her Signal Corps complement consisted of one officer and 12 men.

The facilities of FP-47 were needed immediately at Hollandia to supplement the heavily loaded signal nets that could hardly carry the message burden imposed by the invasion and the subsequent build-up there of a great base. Arriving on 25 June, she anchored offshore and ran cables to the message centers on land. Her powerful transmitters opened new channels to SWPA headquarters in Brisbane and to the advance headquarters still at Port Moresby. At Hollandia, and at Biak, to which the FP-47 moved early in September, this one ship handled an average of 7,000 to 11,000 code groups a day.

Many film industry personalities served in the Signal Corps, including Stan Lee, an American comic book writer, Tony Randall, an actor, and Jean Shepherd, a radio storyteller, author, and narrator of A Christmas Story.

In 1942, General George C. Marshall ordered the creation of the Army Pictorial Service (APS) to produce motion pictures for the training, indoctrination, and entertainment of the American forces and their Allies. The APS took over Kaufman Astoria Studios in 1942 and produced over 2,500 films during the war, with over 1,000 redubbed in other languages. The Army left Astoria studios and film production in 1971.

Julius Rosenberg worked for the Signal Corps Labs from 1940 to 1945. He was dismissed early in 1945, when it was learned, he had been a member of the Communist Party USA secret apparatus and had passed the secret of the proximity fuze to the Soviet Union.

=== Cold War ===
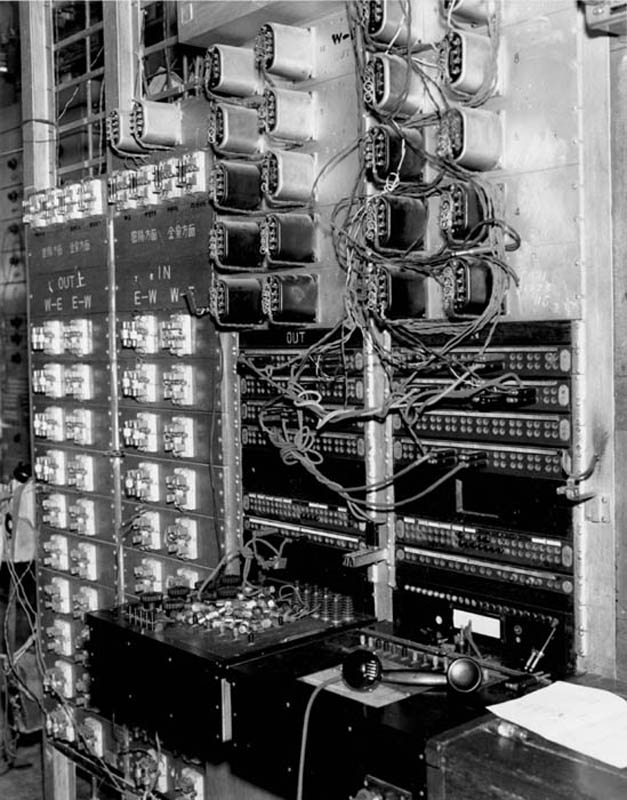
SC345199 – Korean War Equipment at Repeater Station, Taegu, Korea. Quad cable terminal on left, test board on right and center on 1 August 1950.

The Signal Corps' Project Diana successfully bounced radar signals off the moon in 1946, paving the way for space communications.

In 1948, researchers at Fort Monmouth grew the first synthetically produced large quartz crystals. The crystals were able to be used in the manufacture of electronic components, and made the United States largely independent of foreign imports for this critical mineral. In 1949, the first auto-assembly of printed circuits was invented. A technique for assembling electronic parts on a printed circuit board, developed by Fort Monmouth engineers, pioneered the development and fabrication of miniature circuits for both military and civilian use. Although they did not invent the transistor, Fort Monmouth scientists were among the first to recognize its importance, particularly in military applications, and pioneered significant improvements in its composition and production.

Everything was to change as world tensions increased with the Cold War and the Berlin Airlift. To sustain the Army's worldwide commitments, it again became necessary to enlarge the capacity of every activity on-post.

In June 1950, with the onset of the Korean War, President Harry S. Truman quickly received the necessary authorization to call the National Guard and Organized Reserves to 21 months of active duty. He also signed a bill extending the Selective Service Act until 9 July 1951. The Officer Candidate School was re-established.

The fighting in Korea brought to light the need for new techniques in the conduct of modern warfare. The use of mortars by the enemy, and the resultant need to quickly locate and destroy the mortar sites, resulted in development of the Mortar-Radar Locator AN/MPQ-3 and AN/MPQ-10 at the Communications Electronics Research and Development Engineering Center, better known as the Albert J. Myer Center, or simply, the Hexagon. Korea's terrain and road nets, along with the distance and speed with which communications were forced to travel, limited the use of wire. The Signal Corps' VHF radio became the "backbone" of tactical communications throughout the war.

The development of new equipment, however, placed requirements on the Signal Corps to provide increased numbers of trained electronics personnel to work in the fire control and guided missiles firing battery systems. To meet this need, Signal Corps Training Units—the 9614th and 9615th—were established at Aberdeen, Maryland and Redstone Arsenal in Alabama. These units provided instruction on electronics equipment used in the antiaircraft artillery and guided missile firing systems.

Following the arrest of the Julius and Ethel Rosenberg in 1950, two former Fort Monmouth scientists, Joel Barr and Alfred Sarant, defected to the Soviet Union. On 31 August 1953, having received word of possible subversive activities from Fort Monmouth's commanding general, Kirke B. Lawton, the Chairman of the Permanent Subcommittee on Investigations (PSI), Senator Joseph McCarthy, suspected a spy ring still existed in the Signal Corps labs. At first, McCarthy conducted his hearings behind closed doors, but opened them to the public on 24 November 1953. Extensive Congressional hearings were continued in 1955 under the chairmanship of Senator John McClellan of Arkansas.

In the 1950s, the Army Pictorial Service produced a series of television programs called The Big Picture that were often aired on American television. The last episode was produced in 1971.

On 18 December 1958, with Air Force assistance, the Signal Corps launched its first communications satellite, Project SCORE, demonstrating the feasibility of worldwide communications in delayed and real-time mode by means of relatively simple active satellite relays.

The Vietnam War's requirement for high-quality telephone and message circuits led to the Signal Corps' deployment of troposcatter radio links that could provide many circuits between locations more than 200 miles apart. Other developments included the SYNCOM satellite communications service, and a commercial fixed-station system known as the Integrated Wideband Communications System, the Southeast Asia link in the Defense Communications System.

=== Korean War and Vietnam War ===
During the Korean War and Vietnam War the Signal Corps operated officer candidate schools initially at Fort Monmouth in 1950–1953, graduating 1,234 officers, and at Fort Gordon in 1965–1968, which produced 2,213 signal officers (The World War II Signal OCS program at Fort Monmouth, from 1941 to 1946, graduated 21,033 Signal Corps officers).

Modern warfare utilizes three main types of signal soldiers. Some are assigned to specific military bases ("Base Ops"), and they are charged with installation, operation, and maintenance of the base communications infrastructure along with hired civilian contracted companies. Others are members of non-signal Army units, providing communications capability for those with other jobs to accomplish (e.g. infantry, medical, armor, etc.) in much the same way as, say, the unit supply sections, unit clerks, or chemical specialists. The third major type of signaler is assigned to a signal unit. This particular unit's purpose is to provide communications links between the Army units in their area of operations and other signal nodes in further areas served by other signal units.

Sending radio signals across the vast Pacific Ocean had always been unreliable. In August 1964, radio communications across the sea were given a huge boost in quality: The first satellite terminal ever installed in a combat zone was installed in Ba Queo, near Saigon, led by Warrant Officer Jack Inman. This enabled reliable communications to Hawaii, and thereby to Washington, D.C.

Communicating across the varied landscapes of Vietnam presented a variety of challenges. The solution came by utilizing "troposcatter" technology, in which radio signals beamed up into the atmosphere are "bounced" back down to Earth, bypassing debilitating terrain. The Army had little experience with this technology, so they contracted the development of the systems to Page Engineering. In January 1962, Secretary of Defense Robert McNamara approved the system of troposcatter units under the operational name of BACKPORCH.

The escalation of the number of troops in the Vietnam War caused an increasing need for more communications infrastructure. In the spring of 1966 the assorted Signal units were reassigned to the newly formed 1st Signal Brigade. By the close of 1968 this brigade consisted of six signal groups and 22 signal battalions—roughly 23,000 soldiers.

The first Vietnam War death on the battlefield was a Signal Corps radio operator, SP4 James Thomas Davis of the 3rd Radio Research Unit of the United States Army Security Agency.

=== Post-Vietnam and Gulf War ===
Established in 1971 by the Department of Defense, the Joint Tactical Communications Office developed the TRI-TAC (Tri-Service Tactical Communications) system to establish common digital standards, optimize existing analog hardware, and modernize tactical battlefield communications. Manufactured by GTE Sylvania, its key switching components—such as the hybrid AN/TTC-39 circuit switch and the store-and-forward AN/TYC-39 message switch—were mounted in transportable S-280 shelters to support high-mobility joint operations for all military branches. The architecture enabled a seamless multi-year transition from predominantly analog signals to fully digital, high-speed integrated voice and data capabilities.

A major program in 1988 was the initial production and deployment of the Mobile Subscriber Equipment (MSE) system. The MSE system called for setting up the equivalent of a mobile telephone network on a battlefield, allowing a commander or Tactical Operations Center (TOC) to connect mobile telephones and fax machines in vehicles with each other, sending and receiving secure information. Talking through signal nodes, MSE established a seamless connection from the battlefield even back to commercial telephone lines. Significant to the Signal soldiers, MSE was fielded on the backs of Humvee, rather than on the larger, less-mobile M35 2½-ton cargo trucks—the "deuce and a half".

By 1990, most Army units had replaced their older VRC-12 series FM radios for the new SINCGARS ("Single-Channel Ground-Air Radio Systems") family of equipment. Rather than sending a signal along one signal frequency, the SINCGARS radios sent their signals across many frequencies, "hopping" from one frequency to another at high speed. This allowed many nets to share an already-crowded frequency spectrum. Later generations of these radios combined the communications security (COMSEC) encryption devices with the receiver/transmitter, making a single easier-to-program unit. Most significant, the SINCGARS radios could send and receive digital traffic with great fidelity. By the advent of Operation Desert Shield, all deployed Army units had transitioned to SINCGARS, then considered among the most secure tactical FM communications systems available. The SINCGARS radios have a failure rate in extreme heat of once every 7,000 hours compared to the VRC-12 series' failure rate of 200–300 hours.

=== Afghanistan and Iraq ===
Since October 2001, the Signal Corps provided communications for the War in Afghanistan and the Iraq War. The Signal Corps fielded the Warfighter Information Network-Tactical (WIN-T). It provided "On-The-Move" down to the company level for maneuver, fires, and aviation brigades, and fully supported the Future Combat Systems (FCS) program. It also provided protected satellite communications "On-The-Move" capability against jamming, detection and intercept, and will be aligned with the Telecommunications Satellite (TSAT) program.

== Military occupational specialties ==
The Signal Corps military occupational specialties are:

=== Enlisted ===
- 25B: Information Technology Specialist
- 25D: Cyber Network Defender
- 25E: Electromagnetic Spectrum Manager
- 25H: Network Communications Systems Specialist (Merged 25L, 25N, 25Q)
- 25S: Satellite Communication Systems Operator / Maintainer (Merged with 25P)
- 25U: Signal Support Systems Specialist
- 25Z: Visual Information Operations Chief

=== Warrant officer ===
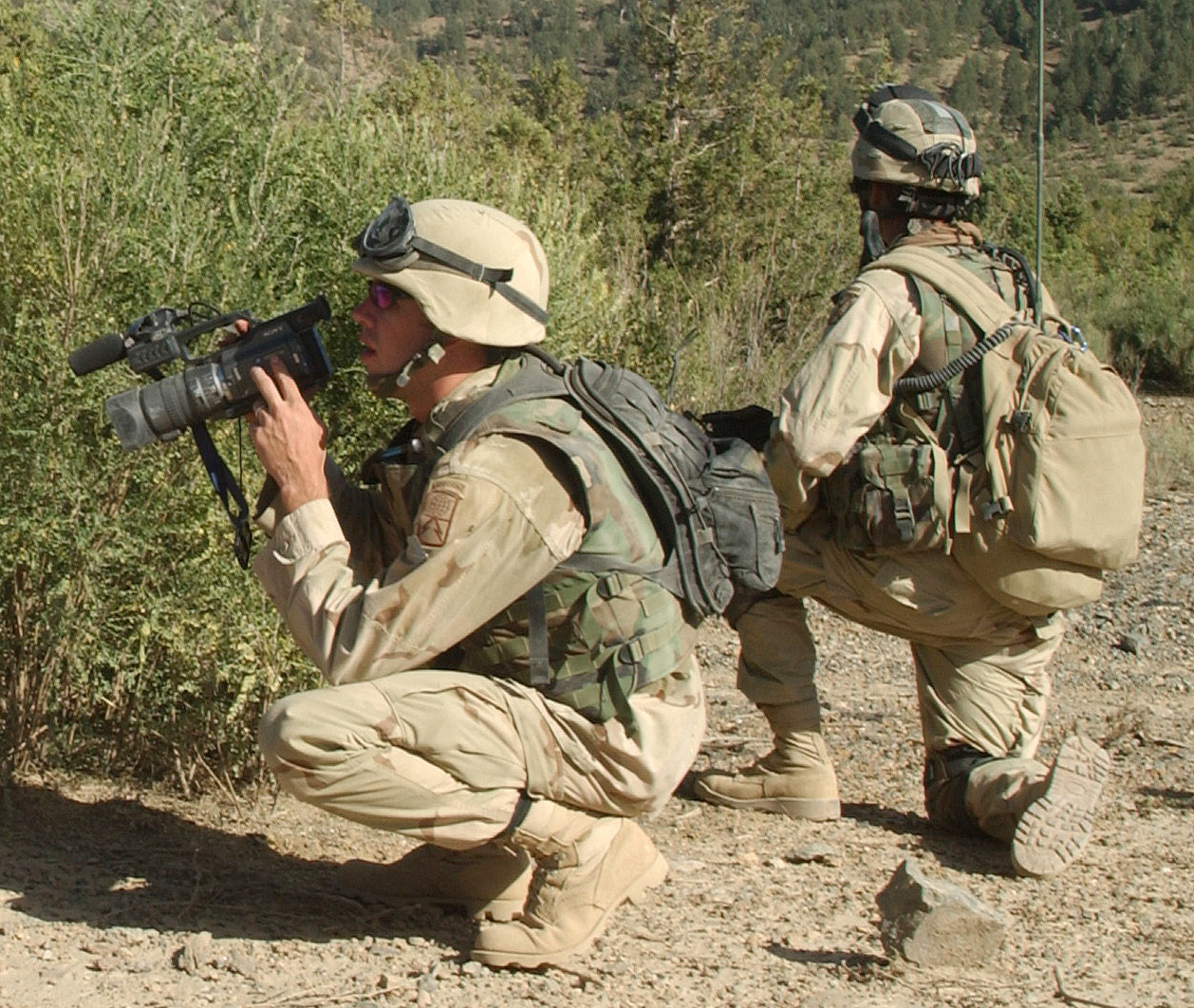
A Combat Documentation Specialist of the 1108th Signal Brigade documents 10th Mountain Division soldiers as they search a mountainside near Shkin Firebase in late 2003.

- 255A Information Services Technician
- 255N Network Management Technician
- 255S Information Protection Technician
- 255Z Senior Signal Systems Technician

Note 1: 250N has been changed to 255N.
Note 2: 251A and 254A have been merged into 255A.
Note 3: 255S is new.

=== Commissioned officer areas of concentration (AOC) ===
- 25A Signal Officer

=== Commissioned officer functional areas (FA) ===
- FA26A Telecommunications Systems Engineer
- FA26B Data Systems Engineer

== Heraldic items ==
=== Coat of arms ===
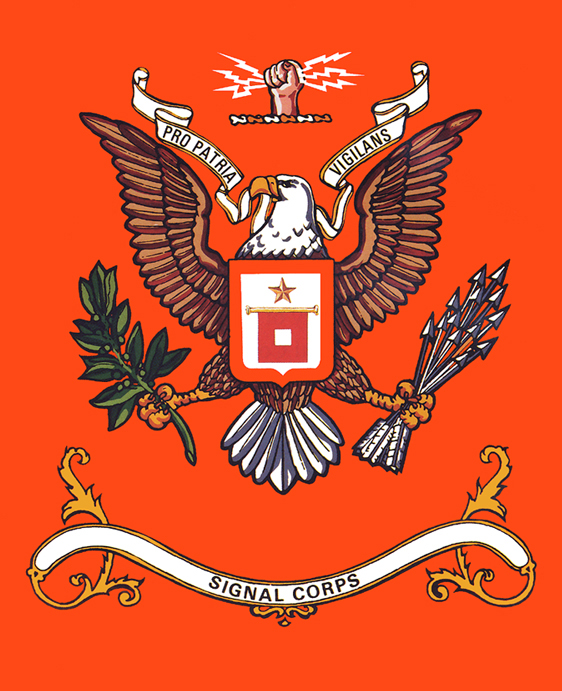
The Signal Corps Regimental Color

- Shield: Argent, within a bordure tenne a baton fesswise or and suspended therefrom a signal flag gules charged at center with a square of the first, in chief a mullet bronze.
- Crest: On a wreath of the colors argent and tenne a dexter hand couped at the wrist, clenched, palm affronte, grasping three forked lightning flashes, all proper, flashes argent.
- Motto: Pro Patria Vigilans (Watchful for the Country).
- The U.S. Army Signal Corps March: "From flag and torch in the Civil War, to signal satellites afar, we give our Army the voice to give command on battlefield or global span, in combat, we're always in the fight, we speed the message day or night, technicians too, ever skillful, ever watchful, we're the Army Signal Corps."
- Symbolism:
1. Orange and white are the colors traditionally associated with the Signal Corps.
2. The signal flag suspended from a baton is adopted from a badge that originated in 1865 and was called the Order of the Signal Corps.
3. The bronze battle star represents formal recognition for participation in combat. It adorned a signal flag and was first awarded to Signal Corps soldiers in 1862.

=== Branch insignia ===
- The Signal Corps branch insignia is represented by two signal flags-on gold staffs- crossed, dexter flag white with a red center, the sinister flag red with a white center, with a flaming torch of gold color metal upright at center of crossed flags.
1. "Crossed flags" have been used by the Signal Corps since 1868, when they were prescribed for wear on the uniform coat by enlisted men of the Signal Corps.
2. In 1884, a burning torch was added to the insignia and the present design adopted on 1 July 1884.
3. The flags and torch are symbolic of signaling or communication.

=== Regimental Distinctive Insignia ===
- Description: A gold color metal and enamel device that consists of a gold eagle grasping a horizontal baton from which is suspended a red signal flag with a white center, enclosing the flag from a star at the bottom, a wreath of laurel all gold and at top left and right a white scroll inscribed PRO PATRIA at left and VIGILANS at right in gold.
- Symbolism:
1. The gold eagle holds in his talons a golden baton, from which descends a signal flag.
2. The design originated in 1865 from a meeting of Signal Corps officers, led by Major Albert J. Myer, the chief signal officer, in Washington, D.C.
3. The badge was a symbol of faithful service and good fellowship for those who served together in war and was called the Order of the Signal Corps.
4. The motto Pro Patria Vigilans (Watchful for the Country) was adopted from the Signal School insignia and serves to portray the cohesiveness of Signal soldiers and their affiliation with their regimental home.
5. The laurel wreath represents the achievements of the corps since its inception.
6. The battle star centered on the wreath represents formal recognition for participation in combat. It adorned a signal flag and was first awarded to Signal Corps soldiers in 1862. The battle star reflects the Signal Corps' role in combined arms operations.

=== Inception ===
The Signal Corps was authorized as a separate branch of the Army by an Act of Congress on 3 March 1863 (Public Law No. 58 Article VIII, Section 17 and 18). However, the Signal Corps dates its existence from 21 June 1860, when Congress authorized the appointment of one signal officer in the Army, and a War Department order carried the following assignment: "Signal Department—Assistant Surgeon Albert J. Myer to be Signal Officer, with the rank of Major, 17 June 1860, to fill an original vacancy."

=== Branch color ===
Orange with white piping. Orange was selected in 1872 as the Signal Corps branch color. In 1902, the white piping was added to conform to the custom that prevailed of having piping of a different color for all branches except the line branches.

== Notable members ==
Notable members of the Signal Corps include General of the Army (later General of the Air Force) Henry H. Arnold, Lester Asheim, Frank Capra, John Cheever, Frank Lautenberg, Stan Lee, Russ Meyer, Tony Randall, Jean Shepherd, John C. Holmes, Julius Rosenberg, Darryl Zanuck, Samuel Alito, Paul Bilzerian and Carl Foreman.

Five members of the Signal Corps have been awarded the Medal of Honor:

- Private First Class Will C. Barnes, for actions during the Indian Wars
- First Lieutenant Gordon Johnston, for actions during the Philippine–American War
- First Lieutenant Charles E. Kilbourne, for actions during the Philippine–American War
- Private Morgan D. Lane, for actions during the American Civil War
- Brigadier General Adolphus Greely, for life service to the Signal Corps and Army Service from the American Civil War until 1908

== See also ==
- List of U.S. Signal Corps Vehicles
- Ghost Army (Operation Quicksilver)
- Network Enterprise Technology Command/9th Signal Command (Army)
- Joint Electronics Type Designation System
- Russian Signal Troops

== Notes ==
- Raines, Rebecca Robbins (2005). "Signal Corps". Army Lineage Series. US Army Center of Military History.
