= USS Volador (IX-59) =

History

United States
- Owner: W. L. Valentine
- Builder: William Müller and Company, Wilmington, California
- Launched: 1926
- Acquired: 2 February 1942 (US Navy); August 1943 (US Army)
- In service: 19 February 1942 (US Navy); July 1943 — August 1943 (US Coast Guard); August 1943 (US Army)
- Out of service: 17 August 1943 (US Navy)
- Stricken: 3 September 1943 (US Navy)
- Identification: Official Number: 225571; Signal letters: MGCF (1930), KGAV (1933)
- Notes: Apparently disposed of in the Philippines by Army after war use.

General characteristics
- Type: Schooner
- Tonnage: 114 GRT
- Length: 110 ft (34 m) LOA; 97 ft (29.6 m) registry
- Beam: 23 ft 5 in (7.14 m)
- Draft: 12 ft 3 in (3.73 m)
- Depth: 11.5 ft (3.5 m)
- Propulsion: Sails; Auxiliary 120 hp 6 cyl diesel engine
- Speed: 7 knots (13 km/h; 8.1 mph)
- Complement: varied by use and operator

USS Volador (IX-59) was a wooden-hulled schooner acquired by the United States Navy in 1942 and after transfer to the United States Army seeing service in the Southwest Pacific Area during World War II as an early command and communications ship. The schooner was designed by William Gardiner and built at Wilmington, California by William Müller and Company in 1926. The yacht was owned by W. L. Valentine, a California yachtsman and Commodore of the California Yacht Club in 1931.

== Yacht Volador ==
The yacht was designed by William Gardiner and built in 1926 for W. L. Valentine, California yachtsman and Commodore of the California Yacht Club, by William Müller and Company in 1926. Registry information for the yacht in 1933 shows Volador with Official Number 225571, signal letters KGAV, changed from MGCF in the 1930 register, 114 GRT, registered length of 97 ft (29.6 m), 23.4 ft (7.1 m) breadth and a depth of 11.5 ft (3.5 m), 120 horsepower diesel engine, a crew of nine and home port of Los Angeles.

In June 1927 the yacht sailed to Alaska with Valentine, his wife and three sons with a crew of ten for fishing in Alaska and British Columbia returning with a stop in Victoria, British Columbia in August. Valentine stated he planned to repeat the trip the next year.

== War service ==
The Navy acquired Volador from W. L. Valentine on 2 February 1942 and placed the vessel in service on 19 February 1942 as a miscellaneous auxiliary vessel designated as IX-59 with the Port Director, San Pedro, California. The vessel operated locally within the 11th Naval District until July 1943 when she was temporarily transferred to the Coast Guard for operational training of Coast Guard district personnel. On 17 August 1943, Volador was delivered to the War Shipping Administration and struck from the Navy List on 3 September 1943.

The War Shipping Administration transferred the schooner to the War Department for operation by the US Army as a communications ship in the Southwest Pacific Area (SWPA). Volador was a part of the "CP fleet", a flotilla of small vessels equipped with radio and Signal Corps personnel first acting as relays from forward areas that expanded into full forward command post communications facilities. Volador participated in the Papua-New Guinea campaign along with the Australian acquired vessels Harold and Argosy Lemal and Geoanna, another US vessel sent to SWPA and used as a communications ship. In addition to standard CP fleet duties Volador became a radio repair ship "to supply floating maintenance wherever most required."

== Post war ==
Volador departed Manila on 28 January 1950 for Hong Kong with owner George B. Ross, his eleven year old son and a crew of eleven. The U.S. 13th air force searched for the overdue yacht in February, unsuccessfully, as the yacht had put into Kwangchow-wan (Guangzhouwan), also noted as Fort-Bayard in reports, after weather and other problems caused Ross to head for what he thought was still territory under French concession. On arrival the yacht was boarded by heavily armed Chinese Communist and interned along with the crew accused of spying. Ross and crew, less one crew member accidentally drowned during captivity, were eventually pushed across the border into Hong Kong dirty and penniless after sixty-four days in detention. Ross chartered the tug Alicia Moiler to reclaim the yacht itself but the crew had obtained a court order in Hong Kong impounding the vessel against a claim for back pay.
