= Al Lane =

Al, Alan, Allan or Allen Lane may refer to:

- Al Lane (filmmaker) (1897–1951), American director and screenwriter, a/k/a Robert Emmett Tansey
- Allen Lane (1902–1970), English publisher
  - Allen Lane, 2010 Canadian imprint of Penguin Random House (Allen Lane#Legacy)
- Allan Lane (1909–1973), American film and TV actor
- Alan Lane (born 1938/1939), Australian tennis player during 1950s and 1960s

== Characters ==
- Alan Lane, accused of murder in 2011 British The Jury (TV serial)

== See also ==
- Allen Lane (SEPTA station), Philadelphia Regional Rail
- Albert Lane (disambiguation)
- Alfred Lane (1891–1965), American Olympic sport shooter
- Alfred Church Lane (1863–1948), American geologist and academic
