= Albert Lane =

Albert Lane may refer to:

- Albert Lane (cricketer) (1885–1948), English cricketer
- Albert Lane (politician) (1873–1950), Australian politician
- Albert G. Lane (1841–1906), American educator
- A.S. Lane (Albert Stephen Lane, 1904–1982), Australian rugby league player
