= Robert Lane =

Robert Lane or Bob Lane may refer to:

== Politicians ==
- Robert Lane (died 1768), British Member of Parliament for York
- Robert Lane (born 1527), MP for Gatton and Northamptonshire
- Bob Lane (Canadian politician), Progressive Conservative party member of the Canadian House of Commons
- Bob Lane (American politician) (born 1947), Republican member of the Georgia House of Representatives

== Others ==
- Robert Lane (soccer) (1882–1940), Canadian amateur football (soccer) player who competed in the 1904 Summer Olympics
- Robert E. Lane (1917–2017), American political scientist and political psychologist
- Robert J. Lane, Supreme Secretary of the Knights of Columbus
- Robert W. Lane (born 1949), Chairman of Deere & Co, company main board director
- Bob Lane (Australian footballer) (1946–1979), Australian rules footballer
- Bob Lane (American football) (born 1959), gridiron football player
- Robert Lane (pirate) (died 1719), pirate who left Edward England to sail the Caribbean; occasionally just called "Captain Lane"

== See also ==
- Bob Saget (Robert Lane Saget, 1956-2022), American stand-up comedian, actor and television host
