= 255n =

255N is a US Army Military Occupational Specialty code for a Network Management Technician - a Warrant Officer Military Occupational Specialty in the Signal Corps. It was previously known as 250N.

Network Management Technicians transport the voice, video and data networks establishing and maintaining the transport layer environment of Army's portion of the Cyberspace domain through network management/enterprise systems management (NM/ESM) functions to include fault management, configuration management, auditing and accountability measures, maintaining performance standards, and implementing security measures at all levels in support of combat information superiority and command and control. They supervise and manage the operation and internetworking of telecommunications networks, network systems equipment, network nodal transmission and transport systems, network management system platforms, networked information systems and associated personnel at both the local area and wide area network level. They plan, install, administer, manage, maintain, integrate, operate, service, secure, optimize and troubleshoot communications networks and networked-systems connectivity and capacity in order to transmit information as an element of combat power. They supervise and oversee network security planning and the implementation and use of electronic keys and frequency management to support communications networks and networked-systems. They manage the training of personnel on the planning, installation, administration, management, maintenance, integration, operation, servicing, securing, optimization and troubleshooting of communications networks and networked-systems. They develop policy recommendations and provide technical guidance and advice to commanders and staffs on the management and operation of Army, joint, intergovernmental, interagency and multinational communications networks and networked-systems.
