= Mark Lane =

Mark Lane may refer to:

- Mark Lane (author) (1927–2016), attorney, researcher, and author who wrote Rush to Judgment
- Mark Lane (cricketer, born 1968), English cricketer
- Mark Lane (journalist), American journalist and author
- Mark Lane (New Zealand cricketer) (born 1969), New Zealand cricketer
- Mark Lane (broadcaster) Garden designer
- Mark Lane, London, a street in London
- Mark Lane tube station, a former station on the London Underground
