= Tom Jennings (pool player) =

American pool player and mathematics professor

Tom Jennings (born 1951) is an American professional pocket billiards (pool) player and mathematics professor. He won the BCA U.S. Open Straight Pool Championship in 1976 and 1977, being the first player since Steve Mizerak to win consecutive championships. He won both titles while also a full-time mathematics professor at Middlesex County College in New Jersey.

== Early years ==
At 17 years of age, Jennings was a highly skilled player who claimed to be capable of making runs of 300.

== Career ==
In August 1976, despite having never won a single match in four prior BCA U.S. Open Straight Pool Championships, Jennings was victorious in the straight pool (14.1 continuous) championship held in Chicago. In 1977, the tournament was held in Dayton, Ohio in September. Jennings was not positioned well for a repeat performance. He lost in the first match of the double elimination tournament to Tom Kollins by a score of 150–135. He won the next five matches easily, and earned the right to play Dick Lane in the championship match.The championship was played where the winner being the first to score 200 points. Lane was a formidable opponent, having made a run of 111 points earlier in the tournament. After 19½ innings, Lane was in a 64-point run and was leading by a score of 196–42, four points away from the championship. On the 65th shot of his run, Lane missed the break, giving Jennings an opening. Jennings returned immediately with a 71-point run of his own (his personal best for the tournament), which closed the gap to 196–113. The two mostly traded safeties for ten more innings, during which time Lane only sank a single additional ball while Jennings inched his way closer to Lane's score. With the score at 197–171 after 30 innings, Jennings put together a final run of 29 points to seal his second consecutive US Open championship. Jennings' 158 points to Lane's 1 over the last eleven and a half innings has been called "Billiards' Biggest Comeback."

== Titles ==
- 1976 Maine 14.1 Championship
- 1976 BCA U.S. Open Straight Pool Championship
- 1977 BCA U.S. Open Straight Pool Championship
