= Walter Lane =

Walter Lane may refer to:

- Walter P. Lane (1817–1892), Confederate general during the American Civil War
- Walter B. Lane (1925–1989), American photojournalist
