= Geoanna =

History

United States
- Owner: George L. Craig Trust (1934—1938); Seven-Up Bottling Co. of Los Angeles (1938—1942); United States Maritime Commission/War Shipping Administration (1942—end of war disposal); Unknown, Philippines
- Builder: Craig Shipbuilding, Long Beach CA
- Cost: $120,000
- Yard number: 155
- Launched: 1934
- Acquired: 1 February 1942 (US Navy); 3 September 1943 (US Army)
- In service: 19 February 1942 – 28 August 1943 (US Navy); 3 September 1943–1945 (US Army)
- Identification: Official number: 234117
- Fate: Undergoing restoration in the Philippines in the year 2000.

General characteristics
- Tonnage: 122 GRT
- Length: 111 ft 6 in (33.99 m) overall; 96.5 ft (29.4 m) registered
- Beam: 22 ft 6 in (6.86 m)
- Draft: 14 ft 9 in (4.50 m)
- Speed: 8 knots (15 km/h; 9.2 mph)

Geoanna was a steel auxiliary schooner built in 1934 by Craig Shipbuilding Company in Long Beach, California. Geoanna was requisitioned during World War II for service briefly with the U.S. Navy before transfer to the U.S. Army for Southwest Pacific operations. There Geoanna served as a United States Army Signal Corps communications ship with a mixed United States Army, Navy and Australian civilian crew through the New Guinea and Philippine campaigns. The ship remained in the Philippines after post war disposal.

== Pre War ==
Geoanna was designed by George L. Craig and built at the Craig shipyard as hull number 155 with ownership vested in the George L. Craig Trust. Registry information shows the yacht registered with official number 234117, a gross tonnage of 122, net tonnage 90, registered length of 96.5 ft (29.4 m), 22.5 ft (6.9 m) breadth, and depth of 17.9 ft (5.5 m). Original crew was stated as five. The yacht on the 31 July 1935 trial cruise, with George Craig and nephews James G. Craig and John Craig II as well as local yachtsmen, was rigged with a Marconi mainsail and gaff-rig foresail with 6,300 sq ft (585.3 m^{2}) sail area. The yacht, with a waterline length of 81 ft (24.7 m) had a 150-horsepower auxiliary diesel engine, fuel capacity for 2,000-mile (unit type not stated) cruising radius and accommodations for ten persons. Geoanna was described as the "largest and most costly steel sailing yacht built on the Pacific Coast" in years.

In 1938 Geoanna was sold to the Seven-Up Bottling Co. of Los Angeles. The yacht is shown as registered with call letters WNAP. Donald K. Washburn, president of the company, sailed the yacht in races that included the 1939 Trans-Pacific race from San Francisco to Diamond Head, Honolulu, Hawaii. Geoanna was the largest yacht in the race and was one of two yachts broadcasting daily progress by shortwave radio.

When requisitioned the yacht was the property of the Seven-Up Bottling Co. of Los Angeles. The company had bought the vessel from the original owner in 1938 for $60,000 and made some updates at additional cost before requisition. Geoanna was requisitioned 1 February 1942 for war service by the United States Maritime Commission. The War Shipping Administration had set a just value of $20,000, of which $15,000 was paid.

== World War II ==
On 1 February 1942 the vessel was acquired by the U.S. Navy from the Maritime Commission and placed in service 19 February 1942 as the unclassified miscellaneous vessel Geoanna (IX-61). Geoanna was never commissioned and thus never bore the USS designation. The vessel was assigned to the 11th Naval District performing miscellaneous duties for Port Director, San Pedro, California. On 2 July 1943 Geoanna was turned over to the United States Coast Guard for service as a Coast Guard operational training ship until being redelivered to the Maritime Commission by the Navy 28 August 1943.

The U.S. Army acquired Geoanna on 3 September 1943 for service in the Southwest Pacific Area. That command modified the vessel as a communications ship for use by the Army Signal Corps. On 12 December 1943 the ship became part of the Army operated radio communication fleet joining the other sailing ships Volador and the previously operating, Australian registered vessels, Harold and Argosy Lamal. A crew of mixed Army, Navy and Australian civilian personnel operated these predecessors of the CP, or Command Post, ships in the Port Moresby, Woodlark and Laee-Salamau areas. Geoanna was given the Army designation of TP-249. The ship served as a communications relay during operations of the Western New Guinea campaign into the Moluccas through landings at Tacloban in the Philippines.

== Post war ==
After the war in Seven-Up Bottling Co. of Los Angeles, Inc., V. United States the United States Court of Claims set the yacht's value at $30,000 when requisitioned and ordered payment of the additional $15,000. The ship remained in the Philippines after the war, was reportedly undergoing restoration and subject of additional lawsuits as late as 2009.
