= Booya (ship) =

Schooner wrecked in Darwin, Australia

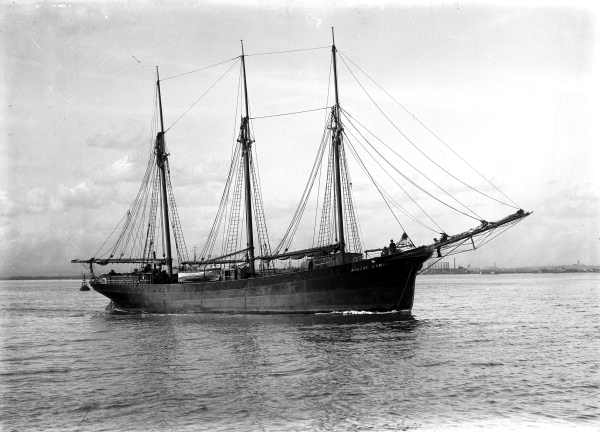
- Booya as Argosy Lemal, c. 1940

History
- Name: De Lauwers (1917–20); Argosy Lemal (1920–49); Ametco (1949–52); Clair Crouch (1952–64); Booya (1964–74)
- Owner: Argosy Shipping & Coal Co Ltd, Newcastle upon Tyne (1920–23); Yorke Shipping Pty Ltd, Port Adelaide (1923–42); Australian Government (1942–49); Australian Middle East Trading Co (1949–52); M B Crouch & Co Ltd (1952–64); Mornington Island Fishing Co (1964–68); Denham Island Transport Co (1968–74)
- Operator: Owner operated except:-; United States Army (1942–49)
- Port of registry: (Netherlands) Amsterdam 1917–20; (United Kingdom) Newcastle upon Tyne 1920–23; (United Kingdom) Port Adelaide (1923–42); United States Army (1942–49); Australia (1949–74)
- Builder: Gebroeders van Diepen, Waterhuizen, Netherlands
- Launched: 1917
- Identification: UK Official Number 144888; Code Letters KGHS (1930–33); Code Letters VJDF (1933–45)
- Fate: Sank 24 December 1974

General characteristics
- Tonnage: 254 GRT (Argosy Lemal)
- Length: 117 ft 5 in (35.79 m)
- Beam: 24 ft 5 in (7.44 m)
- Draught: 10 ft 4 in (3.15 m)
- Propulsion: Sails, 1 × 2SCSA oil engine, 130 bhp (97 kW) (Argosy Lemal)
- Sail plan: Schooner

Booya was a steel-hulled three-masted schooner with an auxiliary oil engine built in the Netherlands in 1917 and originally named De Lauwers. The schooner was renamed Argosy Lemal in 1920 and carried that name until 1949. As Argosy Lemal the ship served as one of the early United States Army communications ships from 1942 to 1949. In 1949, on return to civilian use, the vessel was renamed Ametco, Clair Crouch and finally Booya in 1964. Booya was last seen anchored off Fort Hill wharf in Darwin Harbour at about 8.00pm on 24 December 1974, the evening Cyclone Tracy hit Darwin. Nearly twenty-nine years later, in October 2003, she was discovered by chance in Darwin Harbour, lying on her starboard side in about 20 metres of water.

== Design and construction ==
De Lauwers was a designed for coastal and near-sea trading taking advantage of the compact auxiliary internal combustion engines, in conjunction with the traditional sailing ship design of a three-masted schooner. The engine not only ensured that voyages could be scheduled more reliably, but enabled the steel hull to have flat bottom and shallower draught, enabling the ship to carry more cargo and enter more small ports and rivers. Under sail alone, such a profile would be less manageable. As built, she measured 254 GRT and 192 NRT192, with a length of 117.5 ft (35.81 m), breadth of 24.5 ft (7.47 m) and depth of 10.2 ft (3.11 m). The 130 bhp (97 kW) 2-cylinder oil engine was made by Steywal Motorfabriek of Overschie.

The shipyard of Gebroeders Van Diepen of Waterhuizen, near Groningen, Netherlands, built De Lauwers and her two sister ships, De Wadden and De Dollart, for the Nederlandsche Stoomvaart Maatschappij (Netherlands Steamshipping Company). They were able to take advantage of the unique trading conditions the Dutch had during the First World War due to their neutrality, giving the opportunity to trade with both Germany and the Allies.

== History 1917-1942 ==
De Lauwers was registered in Amsterdam and entered service in 1917 with Dutch code Letters PJBT. In 1920, she became known as the Argosy Lemal after she was purchased and registered by the Argosy Shipping and Coal Company in Newcastle-on-Tyne in England. In 1923, she was brought to Australia and was purchased by Yorke Shipping Pty Ltd and subsequently played an active role in coastal shipping working numerous ports including Port Adelaide and Hobart. That company later became a subsidiary of the Adelaide Steamship Company.

== U.S. Army WWII service ==
In November 1942, the Commonwealth Government requisitioned Argosy Lemal and she played an important role in the US Army Small Ships Section, functioning as a radio communication vessel in the Arafura and Timor Seas during World War II. The crew of 12 was made up of Australians, Americans, Norwegians, Scandinavians, Scots, and English personnel. As operations against the enemy began in the island and ocean areas northward from Australia in 1942, amphibious communications became necessary. The SWPA chief signal officer, General Spencer B. Akin, created a small fleet that served as relay ships from forward areas to headquarters. Their function and number soon expanded when they took aboard the forward command post communications facilities as the Army's CP fleet. The small communications ships, part of the U.S. Army's Small Ships Section of Australian, acquired vessels known officially as the "catboat flotilla," proved so useful in amphibious actions that Army elements in SWPA operations continually competed to obtain their services. The first Australian vessels acquired by General Akin to be converted during the first half of 1943 by Australian firms into communications ships, were the Harold (S-58, CS-3), an auxiliary ketch, and Argosy Lemal (S-6). (Note: These initial ships would be joined by the U.S. sailing ships Volador and Geoanna.) From Milne Bay, the vessels then served at Port Moresby, at Woodlark, and in the Lae-Salamaua area through mid-1943.

A graphic account of some of the vicissitudes of the Argosy Lemal and its mixed crew came from S/Sgt. Arthur B. Dunning, Headquarters Company, 60th Signal Battalion. He and six other enlisted men of that unit were ordered aboard her on 9 September 1943, at Oro Bay, New Guinea, to handle Army radio traffic. The commander of the ship reported to naval authorities, not to General Akin. After six months' service along the New Guinea coast, the skipper was removed for incompetence. His replacement was no better. Among other things, he obeyed to the letter Navy's order forbidding the use of unshielded radio receivers at sea. Since the Signal Corps receivers aboard the ship were unshielded and thus liable to radiate sufficiently to alert nearby enemy listeners, the men were forbidden to switch them on in order to hear orders from Army headquarters ashore. As a consequence, during a trip in the spring of 1944 from Milne Bay to Cairns, Australia (on naval orders), the crew failed to hear frantic Signal Corps radio messages to Argosy Lemal ordering her to return at once to Milne Bay to make ready for a forthcoming Army operation. On the way to Australia the skipper, after a series of mishaps attributable to bad navigation, grounded Argosy hard on a reef. Most of the crew already desperately ill of tropical diseases, now had additional worries. The radio antennas were swept away along with the ship's rigging, and help could not be requested until the Signal Corps men strung up a makeshift antenna. Weak with fevers and in a ship on the verge of foundering, they pumped away at the water rising in the hold and wondered why rescue was delayed till they learned that the position of the ship that the skipper had given them to broadcast was ninety miles off their true position. As they threw excess cargo overboard, "some of the guys", recorded Dunning, "were all for jettisoning our skipper for getting us into all of this mess." Much later, too late for the need the Signal Corps had for the ship, the Argosy Lemal was rescued and towed to Port Moresby for repairs to the vessel and medical attention to the crew, many of whom were by then, according to Dunning, "psycho-neurotic." Besides Dunning, a radio operator, there were T/4 Jack Stanton, also a radio operator; T/Sgt. Harold Wooten, the senior non-commissioned officer; T/4 Finch and T/5 Burtness, maintenance men; and T/5 Ingram and Pfc. Devlin, code and message center clerks. Dunning described the Argosy as a 3-mast sailing vessel with a 110-horsepower auxiliary diesel engine. "She was the sixth vessel," he wrote, "to be taken over by the Small Ships Section of the U.S. Army, her primary purpose was handling [radio] traffic between forward areas and the main USASOS headquarters."

== History 1949-1974 ==
After the war, she was purchased by the Middle East Trading Company in 1949 and renamed Ametco (acronym for Australian Middle East Trading Co). The Ametco sank at Low Wooded Island off the Queensland coast, but was salvaged in poor condition, and taken to Melbourne for repairs. She was purchased in 1952 by shipping company MB Crouch & Co Limited, who renamed her Clair Crouch, after the owner's daughter. The Clair Crouch traded around the Australian coast until 1958 when she was converted to carry sulphuric acid between Port Pirie and Port Lincoln in South Australia.

In 1964, she was sold to the Mornington Island Fishing Company and renamed Booya. She was used as a mother ship and fuel supply vessel for the Northern prawn fleets, but became laid up in 1965/66 until she was sold again in 1968 (some sources say 1971) to the Denham Island Transport Company, trading cargo mainly between Dili and Darwin.

On the evening of 24 December 1974, Booya was moored near Fort Hill wharf with four crew and one guest on board. As Cyclone Tracy approached Darwin, she – and all other vessels – were ordered off the wharves and instructed to find safe anchorage. Booya was last seen at about 8.00pm leaving Fort Hill wharf. At the time of her loss, she was 35.8 metres long and had a gross register tonnage of 262 tons. For the next 29 years she remained missing, presumed sunk with the loss of all lives in the huge seas whipped up by Cyclone Tracy's 300 km/h winds.

== Discovery ==
On 22 October 2003, divers discovered the wreck by chance in Darwin Harbour, lying on her starboard side in about 20 metres of water, five nautical miles (9 km) from shore. Her exact location was given as 12°23.381′S 130°46.281′E. The discovery and subsequent identification of the Booya led to a coronial inquiry. The Northern Territory Government signed an instrument re-declaring the wreck site subject to an Interim Conservation Order, under the Heritage Conservation Act ensuring an exclusion zone over the wreck. In 2005, Booya and the surrounding area was declared a 'heritage site'. Despite a thorough search of the Booya by police divers, no human remains were found; however some personal effects, able to be identified by relatives of the deceased persons, were retrieved. The Coroner's Court concluded that the vessel sank due to strong winds and high seas created by Cyclone Tracy and that the crew perished at sea late on 24 or early on 25 December 1974.

== Official number and code letters ==
Official Numbers were a forerunner to IMO Numbers.

Argosy Lemal had the UK Official Number 144888 and used the Code Letters KGHS from 1930 and VJDF from 1933.

== See also ==
- HMAS Arrow (P 88)
