= Albert Lane (cricketer) =

English cricketer

Personal information
- Full name: Albert Frederick Lane
- Born: 29 August 1885; Rowley Regis, Staffordshire, England
- Died: 29 January 1948 (aged 62); Upper Fulbrook, Warwickshire, England
- Nickname: Spinney
- Batting: Right-handed
- Bowling: Right-arm off-break

Domestic team information
- Years: Team
- 1914–1932: Worcestershire
- 1919–1925: Warwickshire
- FC debut: 9 May 1914 Worcestershire v Derbyshire
- Last FC: 17 May 1932 Worcestershire v Essex

Career statistics
Competition	First-class
Matches	57
Runs scored	1,422
Batting average	16.53
100s/50s	0/8
Top score	76
Balls bowled	3,433
Wickets	46
Bowling average	41.13
5 wickets in innings	0
10 wickets in match	0
Best bowling	4/56
Catches/stumpings	27/–
- Source: CricketArchive, 15 September 2007

Albert Frederick Lane (29 August 1885 – 29 January 1948), nicknamed Spinney, was an English amateur first-class cricketer who played more than 50 games for both Warwickshire and Worcestershire between 1914 and 1932, as well as having earlier appeared in the Minor Counties Championship for Staffordshire.

Lane made his first-class debut for Worcestershire at Derby in May 1914. It was a chastening experience: Derbyshire won by an innings and 158 runs, and Lane took no wickets and scored 3 and 0. His next game the following month was little better: another heavy defeat, this time to Essex at Colchester, and 26 not out in the second innings could not make up for match figures of 22–1–94–0. He finally took his maiden wicket at the third attempt, when he claimed the solitary scalp of Hampshire's Phil Mead at Dudley at the end of June. He ended the season with just eight wickets at 55.50, though he did score two half-centuries.

The First World War then brought a halt to first-class cricket for five years. When Lane played again, in 1919, it was for Warwickshire. He played a number of times for them that season and ended with 19 wickets at 28.26 – his highest season's tally — and in consecutive matches that June took 4–58 against Yorkshire and a career-best 4–56 versus Northamptonshire. Although he was absent in 1920 he had a couple more games in 1921, then another gap before two more appearances four years later. That marked the end of his Warwickshire career.

In 1927 Lane returned to Worcestershire, for whom he played 34 times in three years; he acted as captain on three occasions in 1928 and 1929. His new county were terribly weak at this time, finishing bottom of the County Championship in 1927 and 1928, and second-bottom in 1929. Indeed, when Lane, batting at ten in each innings, scored 70 and 60* against Essex at Leyton in May 1929, a performance that his Wisden obituarist considered his "most valuable performance in first-class cricket", it was the first victory that the county had managed in nearly two years.

After that season, Lane played no more regular first-class cricket, though he did make a final, one-off, appearance for Worcestershire three years later versus Essex at Leyton. This was the scene of his heroics in 1929, but a repeat was not to be: Lane had a quiet match, scoring 3 and 18 and not bowling in a drawn game. He was killed in a road accident in 1948, when his car crashed into a hedge.
