= Sidney W. Lane =

American politician and physician (died 1906)

Member of the Maryland House of Delegates from the Worcester County district
- In office 1890–1892

Personal details
- Born: Whaleyville, Maryland, U.S.
- Died: August 1, 1906 Berlin, Maryland, U.S.
- Party: Democratic
- Spouse: Katherine Powell (died)
- Children: 2
- Occupation: Politician; physician

Sidney W. Lane (died August 1, 1906) was an American politician and physician from Maryland.

== Early life ==
Sidney W. Lane was born in Whaleyville, Maryland. He attended lectures and graduated from Jefferson Medical College.

== Career ==
Following graduation, Lane moved to and practiced medicine in Newark, Maryland. He practiced there for about a year before moving to Powell Farm, where he practiced medicine and farmed. He then moved to Berlin, Maryland.

Lane was a Democrat. He served as a member of the Maryland House of Delegates, representing Worcester County, from 1890 to 1892. He also served as school commissioner.

== Personal life ==
Lane married Katherine Powell, of Five Mile Branch. His wife predeceased him around 1896. They had a daughter and son, Mrs. Lambert Ayers and R. Bruce. He died on August 1, 1906, aged about 60, at his home in Berlin.
