= Kenneth Lane =

Kenneth Lane may refer to:

- Kenneth Lane (physicist) (1942–2026), American physicist at Boston University
- Kenneth Lane (canoeist) (1923–2010), Canadian Olympic sprint canoeist
- Kenneth Jay Lane (1932–2017), American costume jewelry designer

== See also ==
- Ken Lane (1912–1996), American musician
- Kenny Lane (1932–2008), boxer
