= Tim Lane (executive) =

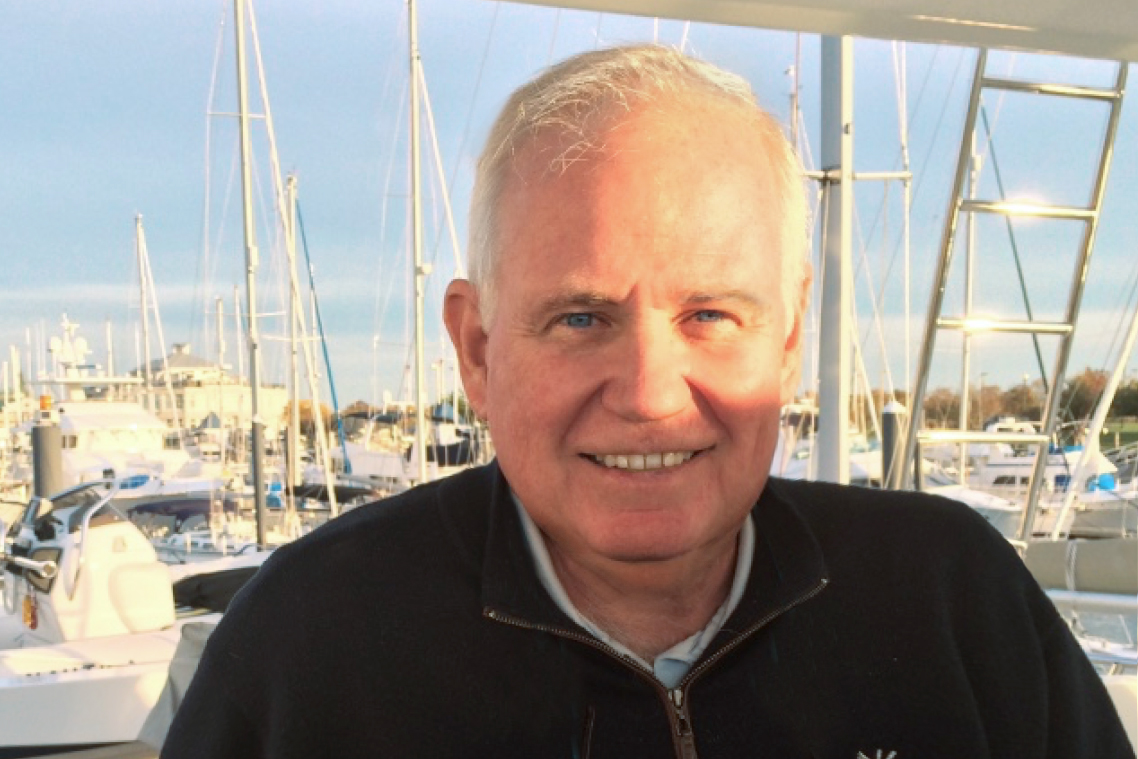
- Born: Chicago
- Education: University of Chicago
- Occupations: USA corporate executive, entrepreneur, investor
- Known for: Expansion of KFC in Asia and the Middle East in the 1990s, Nation building in Afghanistan: Afghanistan Reconstruction Company, Afghanistan International Bank
- Children: Margot; Peter

Tim Lane is a U.S. corporate executive, entrepreneur, and investor.

== Education and early career ==
Tim Lane was born in Chicago, Illinois. He received his B.A. in Accounting from the University of Dayton, and his M.B.A. in marketing and finance from the University of Chicago Booth School of Business.

== Career ==
Lane's early professional experience included a general management role at Masonite International Corporation and the position of Assistant to the Chairman at Consolidated Packaging Company.

=== PepsiCo, Inc., 1981–1996 ===
In 1981, Lane assumed the role of Director of Business Planning at the Pepsi-Cola Company. During his tenure, he introduced strategies including the roll-up of Pepsi's franchise bottling network. Under Lane's leadership, the Pepsi-Cola company launched a number of new products, including Slice (soft drink). The following year, Lane became Vice President and CFO of Pepsi-Cola's Food Service Division where his leadership contributed to a four-fold increase in divisional profits while doubling Pepsi's market share. Two years later, as Vice President and CFO of Pepsi's Frito-Lay International, he led an acquisition strategy that took division revenue from $400 million to $3 billion. Between 1987 and 1989, Lane oversaw operations in 150 countries as Vice President and CFO of Pepsi-Cola International and KFC Worldwide. The next stage of his career brought him wide recognition in the business community while he served as President of KFC International Asia and CEO of PepsiCo Restaurants International, Asia, and the Middle East.

At KFC International Asia Lane inherited a loss-making 250 store system generating $250 million in sales. Within 6 years he built a new management team, revitalized KFC's flagging franchise system, initiated substantial development of company-owned markets, including the opening of China and India, and built a 2500 store system generating $2.5 billion in revenues and more than $200 million in profits. As KFC President he led 22 consecutive quarters of double-digit growth in stores, revenues and profitability. During this period, Lane also orchestrated the successful IPO of KFC Japan. This expansion resulted in dominant KFC share positions across Asia and the Middle East, and particularly in China. The China expansion in particular brought Lane media attention and acclaim in the international business community. The business growth platform developed by Lane and his team, especially as it related to KFC's dominance in China, enabled PepsiCo to spin off the restaurant group into what is known today as Yum! Brands.

=== Holiday Inn Worldwide, Chairman, President and CEO, 1996 ===
In 1996 Tim Lane became Chairman, President and CEO of Holiday Inn Worldwide, one of the world's largest hotel groups comprising 2,300 hotels with system revenues of $8 billion, direct revenues of $2 billion and operating profits of $300 million. He recruited new top management to re-invigorate the organization and create a results-driven culture. Within a year Lane developed award-winning advertising with a newly engaged advertising and marketing firm, launched a proprietary “extended stay” brand, Staybridge Suites, and bought out troubled joint ventures in India and Indonesia. Lane negotiated several company and industry transformational acquisitions. All of them, however, were ultimately rejected by London-based Bass PLC, parent company of Holiday Inn. A year later Lane sought an early exit when it became apparent to Lane that Bass PLC "lacked the corporate courage to implement real change."

=== Nation Building, Afghanistan, 2002–2007 ===
In 2002 Tim Lane co-founded The Afghanistan Reconstruction Company LLC (ARC), built the new Embassy of the United States, Kabul complex, and completed many vital infrastructure projects. and over the following 5 years rebuilt the Kabul-Kandahar Highway for USAID, built the new Embassy of the United States, Kabul complex, and completed many vital infrastructure projects. Lane established the first privately owned commercial bank in Afghanistan, the Afghanistan International Bank (AIB) in partnership with Asian Development Bank and ING Group. He also constructed, owned and operated a successful soft drink bottling plant in Kabul.

=== Everest Advisors, corporate and charity work, 1997–present ===
Lane is the Managing Director of Everest Advisors, Inc., a venture capital and advisory firm he founded in 1997. Based in Hong Kong, Everest Advisors consulted ChinaVest and JP Morgan on Asia/China portfolio companies. EA was an early investor in Bacterin International (BONE - IPO in 2010), a biologics processing and manufacturing company with proprietary patented technology servicing the orthopedic surgical market, and in Navigate Inc., a cloud based enterprise solution provider serving the financial services industry and competing against firms such as Salesforce.com and SAP.

Lane served as CEO and Vice-Chairman of the Board at Food Automation Service Techniques, Inc (dba Kitchen Brains) which designs, manufactures, and sells sophisticated process controls and cloud-based SaaS solutions for the food services industry. Lane has also served as the Chairman of the Board of True Drinks, Inc, a healthy children's beverage business with ties to The Walt Disney Company.

In April 2016, Lane was elected to the board of directors American Humane Association.
