= Thomas Lane =

Thomas or Tom Lane may refer to:

- Thomas H. Lane, American organic chemist
- Thomas J. Lane (1898–1994), U.S. Representative from Massachusetts
- Thomas Lane (14th-century MP) (died 1423), MP for Canterbury
- Thomas Lane (17th-century MP) (1582–1652), MP for Wycombe 1628, 1640–1648
- Thomas Lane (VC) (1836–1889), Irish recipient of the Victoria Cross
- Thomas Lane, California, an unincorporated community
- Thomas "T.J." Lane, perpetrator of the 2012 Chardon High School shooting
- Thomas K. Lane, Saint Paul native former Minneapolis Police Department officer, fired and convicted on state and federal charges for his part in the murder of George Floyd
- Tom Lane (computer scientist) (born 1955), American computer scientist involved in image compression standards and PostgreSQL development
- Tommy Lane, American wrestler
