= Robert J. Lane =

Robert J. Lane was a Supreme Secretary of the Knights of Columbus, a position he has held from 2005 through 2007. Lane had been Assistant Supreme Secretary for 18 years previously.

In 2000, Lane was made a Knight of St. Gregory by Archbishop Daniel A. Cronin.

In 2006 he received the Charles Carroll of Carrollton Award from the Commodore John Barry Assembly of the Knights of Columbus.

Lane is a Former President of the Farnam Community Board of Directors of New Haven, a 501(c)3 inner-city agency serving children ages 4–18 with a day care, after school, teen youth leadership program and biddy basketball league as well as a summer camp in Durham, CT.. He is also a trustee of St. Stanislaus B. M. Church, in New Haven. He formerly served as vice-chairman of the Hospital of St. Raphael Foundation which was merged with Yale New Haven Hospital.
