= Mary Lane =

American writer and journalist

Mary MacPherson Lane
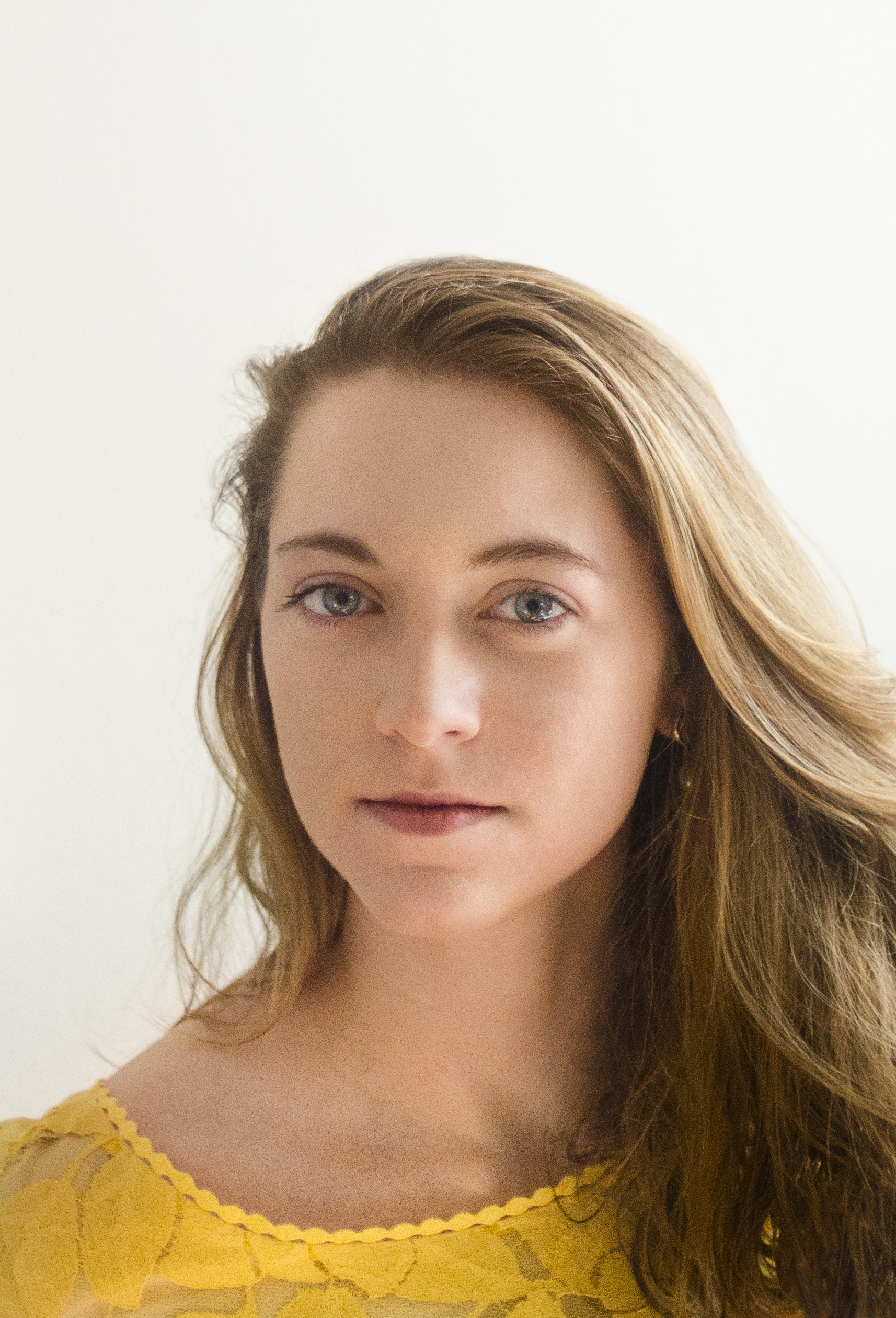
- Born: October 1987 (age 37); Lynchburg, Virginia, U.S.
- Occupation(s): Journalist, art historian

Mary MacPherson Lane (born October 1987) is an American non-fiction writer and journalist specializing in Western European art and history.

Lane gained recognition as the chief European art reporter for The Wall Street Journal, and for publishing numerous scoops on the art trove of Hildebrand Gurlitt. One of Adolf Hitler's main art dealers, Gurlitt bequeathed a collection of roughly 1,300 artworks, many looted from museums and Jewish European families, to his son Cornelius Gurlitt. Her book-length narrative on Nazi-looted art was published in 2019 by Hachette under the title Hitler's Last Hostages: Looted Art and the Soul of the Third Reich.

== Early life ==
Lane was born and grew up in Virginia. She graduated from Episcopal High School, outside of Washington, D.C. Lane spent her senior year of high school in Beijing, where she became proficient in Mandarin Chinese. Lane worked as a Chinese-English interpreter in Beijing during the 2008 Summer Olympics.

== Education ==
In 2010, Lane graduated from Middlebury College with degrees in German and Chinese. She received a DAAD Journalism Scholarship in 2010 and one of five Fulbright Journalism Scholarships for 2010 through 2011, both based in Berlin.

== Career ==
Lane began her professional journalism career writing for the Associated Press in 2009 from their Berlin bureau, covering the effects of the euro crisis on Berlin's legal sex workers.

She wrote in German for the Berliner Zeitung on a DAAD journalism scholarship in 2010. Lane began at The Wall Street Journal as a Fulbright scholar in early 2011 as part of their Berlin-based euro crisis team.

French designer and art collector Hubert de Givenchy worked with Lane on her first major coverage of European art and the art market. In a trio of interviews between Givenchy and Lane that the Journal published in 2012, they discussed his collection of artworks by sculptor François Girardon, Givenchy's dressing of Rose Kennedy for the funeral of her son, President John F. Kennedy, and the designer's friendship with Audrey Hepburn.

In 2013, Lane became the Journal's chief European art reporter, responsible for the paper's coverage of auctions at Sotheby's and Christie's, including the rivalry between the two auction houses. This coverage was heavily investment-focused, including analysis of the volatile prices of contemporary artists and the increased presence of Chinese collectors in the European art market.

Lane also led the Wall Street Journal's coverage of European galleries and art fairs including Art Basel and Frieze, gallery shows in London and Paris, and exhibitions at prominent European museums including the Louvre, the Tate, the Rijksmuseum, and the Kunsthistorisches Museum.

Sotheby's auctioned a $47.9 million drawing by Raphael in December 2012, making the work the most expensive drawing ever auctioned. Lane published an investigation in June 2013 documenting that the anonymous buyer was billionaire financier Leon Black.

Lane was the first international journalist granted an interview with Louvre director Jean-Luc Martinez in October 2013.

In 2014, she became the first journalist in nearly a decade to conduct an interview with German artist Gerhard Richter.

== Gurlitt case ==
Between November 2013 and late 2015, Lane published a series of scoops on the front page and numerous articles inside of the Wall Street Journal about the art trove of Hildebrand Gurlitt, one of Hitler's primary art dealers.

In February 2012, the German government in Bavaria had confiscated the works from Gurlitt's son, Cornelius Gurlitt, but had kept the find a secret, in violation of the Washington Principles, a set of international guidelines on looted art that Germany had signed in 1998. The collection of over 1,200 paintings, sculptures and works on paper included pieces by Edgar Degas, Claude Monet, George Grosz, and Henri Matisse. Lane was the first to publish the news of how Cornelius Gurlitt decided to bequeath his art cache to the Kunstmuseum Bern in Switzerland and that the museum was prepared to accept the estate.

Much of Lane's work tracked two oil paintings stolen by the Nazis from Jewish Europeans, Matisse's "Woman with a Fan" and "Two Riders on a Beach" by Max Liebermann, both present in the Gurlitt trove. After four years of holding the works, Germany returned them to the families of the original owners.

Alt-right activist, white supremacist, and Holocaust denier Carolyn Yeager has targeted Lane's coverage of art collector and World Jewish Congress head Ronald Lauder and Lauder's calls for increased investigation of artworks looted from Jewish Europeans by the Nazis currently held in German museums.

Lane researched the Gurlitt family and Hitler's art looting programs for her first non-fiction book, Hitler's Last Hostages: Looted Art and the Soul of the Third Reich.

Since leaving the Journal in December 2015, Lane has worked as a European art contributor for The New York Times, ARTnews, and contributed to Mike Pesca's reporting at Slate.

== Works ==
- Hitler's last hostages : looted art and the soul of the Third Reich, New York : PublicAffairs, 2019. ISBN 9781610397360, OCLC 1048445514
