= Brendan Lane =

Brendan Lane may refer to:

- Brendan Lane (basketball) (born 1990), American basketball player
- Brendan Lane (Gaelic footballer), Irish Gaelic football player
