= Amanda Lane Root =

American social reformer (1839–1918)

Amanda Lane Root (July 9, 1839 – October 21, 1918) was an American social reformer in the temperance movement, and a leader in Good Templar activities. Root joined Fraternity Lodge of Gloucester, Massachusetts, May 22, 1862, at the institution of the Lodge, and joined the Grand Lodge of Massachusetts, February 22, 1865. For over 50 years, Root gave her influence and energies for the principles of Good Templary and the cause of temperance.

== Early life and education ==
Amanda Lane, daughter of Samuel and Martha Lane, was born in Gloucester, Massachusetts, July 9, 1889. She was educated in the public schools of her native town.

== Career ==
For several years, she worked as a book-keeper for her father, who was largely engaged in the fishing trade. In her public career, she rendered eminent service to the Universalist church and to the temperance cause.

For many years a member of the Universalist church in Gloucester, she has ably represented that body in the local and State bodies, and the State in the General Convention. Identified with the Woman's Centenary Association from its organization in 1871, at which time she became its Recording Secretary, she was subsequently chosen vice-president for Massachusetts, having oversight of the woman's work in that State, a position which she most acceptably filled till the pressure of other duties compelled her to resign.

She was best known in connection with her position and influence in the temperance reform. Gloucester, a center for the salt-water fisheries, was known for an excessive use of intoxicants when the 5,000 fishermen were back on land at the close of the fishing season with plenty of money in their pockets. Her first public work as associated with others in the temperance cause, was in connection with a division of the Sons of Temperance, in which she occupied a prominent position.

In 1862, when Good Templars, distinguished by its fundamental principle that woman is equally entitled with man to the labors and honors of temperance workers, began to establish its Lodges in Massachusetts, Root, united with several of her friends in seeking a charter for Fraternity Lodge, which was instituted in Gloucester in May, of that year. The second highest office in the organization was assigned to her, and at the close of the first term, she became the executive and highest officer in the Lodge. Subsequently, her services were unanimously sought in other positions of responsibility and trust. During her connection with the Lodge, it became the largest Lodge in the State.

In 1865, Root became a member of the Grand Lodge of the State, and such was her reputation in the Order that she was at once elected to one of the highest and most responsible positions in that body. In 1866 and again in 1874, she was a member of the committee to receive, in behalf of the Grand Lodge, the Right Worthy Grand Lodge, and was at each of these sessions a delegate to the supreme body of the Order. At the first of these sessions of the supreme body, she was chosen Right Worthy Grand Vice-Templar, receiving 49 of the 51 votes cast; and on the following year was unanimously re-elected. Her services were acceptably rendered on Committees on Constitutions and on the State of the Order, two of the most important committees of the Order. At the session of the Right Worthy Grand Lodge, in Bloomington, Illinois, she was again elected to the office of Right Worthy Grand Vice-Templar, and was chosen by the New England Representatives to speak for New England at the Public Reception Meeting. She was in attendance at many sessions of the Right Worthy Grand Lodge, a body composed of the leading temperance men and women of all sections of the world.

In 1878, she was elected Grand Worthy Secretary of the Grand Lodge of Massachusetts; she was twice unanimously re-elected. While she avoided, so far as was consistent with her official duties, the notoriety of public life, her earnest speech and her devotion to the temperance cause made gave her a reputation which brought constant invitations for her services in the public platform.

== Personal life ==
In 1876, she married Solomon F. Boot, then of Hinsdale, Massachusetts. They made their home in East Douglas, Massachusetts. She had two children.
