= Morgan D. Lane =

American Medal of Honor recipient (c. 1844-1892)

- Born: c. 1844; Monroe, New York
- Died: July 19, 1892 (aged 47–48)
- Military career
- Allegiance: United States of America; Union
- Branch: United States Army; Union Army
- Service years: 1862 - 1865
- Rank: Sergeant (Cavalry); Private (Signals)
- Units: 5th Michigan Volunteer Cavalry Regiment (United States) Signal Corps
- Conflicts: American Civil War
- Awards: Medal of Honor

Morgan D. Lane (c. 1844 – July 19, 1892) was a Chief Bugler in the Union Army and a Medal of Honor recipient for his role in the American Civil War.

== Medal of Honor citation ==
Rank and organization: Private, Signal Corps, U.S. Army. Place and date: Near Jetersville, Va., April 6, 1865. Entered service at: Allegany Mich. Birth: Monroe, N.Y. Date of issue: March 16, 1866.

Citation:

Capture of flag of gunboat Nansemond.

== See also ==
- List of American Civil War Medal of Honor recipients: G–L
