= Walter B. Lane =

American photojournalist and Life magazine staff photographer

Walter B. Lane (February 2, 1925 – January 16, 1989) was an American photojournalist and Life magazine staffer.

== Life magazine ==
Lane’s first big assignment for Life magazine was to cover the occupation of Iceland by American forces in 1941 during which his return home was delayed for nearly a month due to German U-boat threats. By September 15 that year, he had his first Life cover picture published; Captain Lord Louis Mountbatten, commander of the aircraft carrier HMS Illustrious, and cousin of George VI.

One of his last contributions to the magazine was with his photograph of Henry Luce, its founder, talking to theologian Paul Tillich published as part of the memorial issue.

Among Lane's military subjects were German prisoners-of-war arriving at the Eustis Railroad to begin their orientation program, while others shows POWs attending Catholic services and painting the required white PW on their dyed black uniforms. He also made portraits of military personnel B. Carroll Reece and Commodore James K. Vardaman among others.

== Politics ==
Lane was a frequent documenter of politics and politicians. Famously when photographing President Truman receiving a gift of strawberries, the President threw one into his mouth. His other subjects include Senator Robert M LaFollette Jr working at his desk; Congressman Theodore G. Bilbo reading the Congressional Record; Republican committee members Clarence J. Brown, Marion C. Martin and William C. Murphy Jr. on election night; John Small; Camille Gutt John W Snyder and Eugene Meyer attending first annual session of the World Bank; Government official William L. Clayton; President Harry S. Truman; Senator Hugh Mitchell; Sen Robert F. Wagner talking with Rep. Wright Patman and Wilson W. Wyatt; Congressman Walter H. Judd; Senator Leverett Saltonstall; Senator Joseph H. Ball; Senate reporter John D. Rhodes; Congresswoman Edith Nourse Rogers; Senator Homer S. Ferguson; Senator Harley M. Kilgore; Chief Division Protocol Woodward Stanley swearing in Lt. Gen Walter Bedell Smith as Ambassador to Russia; Winston Churchill and Dwight D. Eisenhower standing on the south portico of the United States Capitol; Sen. Harry F. Byrd Jr.; Navy Secretary James V. Forrestal during the Senate Naval Affairs hearing; Rep. Adolph J. Sabath; Gerhart Eisler reading a newspaper while appearing before the House Un-American Activities Committee meeting; labor leader John L. Lewis; Joseph W. Martin Jr.; Governor Edward Martin; Senator Kenneth McKellar posing with the Flood Control Committee; Henry A. Wallace; Executive Committee of the National Democratic Committee; union leader Harry Bridges; and Joseph Curran

== Society ==
Lane covered an array of social interest stories including a Radio Ham Operator's Field Day; Sisters of the Mother of Charity with relics of Mother Elizabeth Ann Seton; A farmer and his wife sightseeing at the Jefferson Memorial; African American girls working with white girls in a Government office which warranted a story in the mid-century magazine; Clerks working in the American Trucking Associations Building office; a salesman putting a sold sign in an open field near Des Plaines and a billboard advertising a new subdivision of homes to be built on the side of a highway northwest of Chicago. A well-known image by Lane is Mahlon Haines' Shoe House, shot at night. At the American Penwomen's Luncheon he photographed author Taylor Caldwell and Nancy Astor, Viscountess Astor. Behind the scenes at the New York Herald Tribune Syndicate he showed columnist Joseph W. Alsop Jr. sitting at desk with brother Stewart Alsop as they worked.

== Science ==
For science stories Lane photographed Head of the US Atomic Energy Commission David E. Lilienthal and other members Sumner Pike, Lewis Strauss, Robert Bacher and Albert Einstein; quadruplets sharing an oxygenated incubator; and university students experimenting with petri dishes.

== Recognition ==
Lane's 1946 Pattern of Lighted Office Windows in the RFC Building, a rectilinear architectural image that catches silhouettes of workers inside the building, was selected by Edward Steichen and enlarged to mural scale for the 1955 world-touring Museum of Modern Art exhibition The Family of Man that was seen by 9 million viewers.
