= Andrew Lane =

Andrew Lane may refer to:

- Andy Lane (born 1963), British author and journalist
- Andrew Lane (actor) (1947–1999), from The Leisure Hive
- Andrew Lane (record producer), American songwriter and record producer
- Andrew Lane (film producer) (born 1951), American film producer
