= Philip Lane =

Philip Lane may refer to:

- Sir Philip Lane (police officer) (c. 1870–1927), Chief Constable of Lancashire, 1912–1927
- Phil Lane (footballer) (1911–2006), Australian rules footballer
- Philip Lane (composer) (born 1950), British composer and musicologist
- Philip R. Lane (born 1969), Irish economist, fourth Chief Economist of the European Central Bank and former Governor of the Central Bank of Ireland
- Phil Lane (ice hockey) (born 1992), American ice hockey player
