= Charles Lane =

Charles Lane may refer to:

== Actors ==
- Charles Lane (actor, born 1869) (1869–1945), American silent film character performer
- Charles Lane (actor, born 1905) (1905–2007), American centenarian character performer
- Charles Lane (filmmaker) (born 1953), African-American actor, director and writer

== Writers ==
- Charles Lane (transcendentalist) (1800–1870), American philosopher, co-founder of Fruitlands
- Charles Henry Lane (before 1850–after 1918), aka C. H. Lane, British author who researched domestic animals such as the Manx cat
- Charles Daniel Lane (born 1948), English molecular biologist
- Charles Lane (journalist) (born 1961), American reporter for The Washington Post

== Other people ==
- Charles A. Lane (1825–1906), American Republican legislator in Wisconsin
- Charles D. Lane (1840–1911), American mine owner who founded Nome, Alaska
- Charles Lane (athlete) (1905–1954), Australian Olympic sprinter

== Streets ==
- Charles Lane (Manhattan), short street in New York
