= Tim Lane (Australian rules footballer) =

Australian rules footballer

Personal information
- Full name: Thomas Ouseley Blake Lane
- Born: 22 February 1888; Brighton Beach, Victoria
- Died: 23 November 1965 (aged 77); Ballarat, Victoria
- Original team: Ballarat/Sturt
- Height: 198 cm (6 ft 6 in)
- Weight: 87 kg (192 lb)

Playing career^{1}
Years	Club	Games (Goals)
1912	Melbourne	13 (11)
- ^{1} Playing statistics correct to the end of 1912.

Thomas Ouseley "Tim" Blake Lane (22 February 1888 – 23 November 1965) was an Australian rules footballer who played with Melbourne in the Victorian Football League (VFL).

== Family ==
The son of Howard Ousely Blake-Lane (1846-1913), and Blanche Blake-Lane (1861-1938), née Crisp, Thomas Ouseley Blake Lane was born at Brighton Beach on 22 February 1888.

He married Lorna Victoria Penney in 1912.
