= Mark Lane (journalist) =

Journalist

Mark Lane is an American journalist, features writer, columnist, and author who writes about Florida. He has been a columnist and features writer for the Daytona Beach News-Journal. His 2019 book is about Florida's state symbols and how they came to be chosen.

Lane was born in California and grew up in Daytona Beach, Florida, where he graduated from Seabreeze High School. He has a master's degree from Boston University, and lives in Ormond Beach, Florida.

He was interviewed about his book on Florida's state symbols for the St. Pete Catalyst podcast. The Port Charlotte Sun described the books as a well researched, tongue-in-cheek tribute to Florida.

Lane has received several awards for his work from the National Society of Newspaper Columnists and the Florida Society of Newspaper Editors. The 2008 book collecting some of his columns drew praise for making people laugh at misadventures.

== Bibliography ==
- Sandspurs: Notes from a Coastal Columnist (2008) ISBN 9780813032344, a collection of his columns
- Locals of Daytona Beach (2015).
- Roaring Reptiles, Bountiful Citrus, and Neon Pies; An Unofficial Guide to Florida's Official Symbols University of Florida Press (2019)
