= Edgar Lane =

American political scientist (1923–1964)

Edgar Lane (December 12, 1923 – July 29, 1964) was a professor of political science at the University of California Santa Barbara. He was the author and editor of many scholarly articles, book reviews, and a book on lobbying reform. He made substantial contributions to the regulation of lobbying by assisting the House Select Committee on Lobbying Activities (1950).

== Early life and education ==
Lane was born in Rochester, New York, on December 12, 1923. He entered Syracuse University at the age of 16 and completed most of his undergraduate studies prior to joining the United States Army during World War II. As a combat infantryman, he was wounded in action in Europe in 1944, and after his discharge from service the following year, began graduate studies at Syracuse University, receiving an M.A. degree in 1946. He then entered the University of Michigan, where he obtained his Ph.D. degree in 1949. He dissertation committee was chaired by John W. Lederle, who would later serve as president of the University of Massachusetts Amherst. Other committee members included Samuel J. Eldersveld, James K. Pollock, and Lewis G. Vander Velde.

== Career ==
Upon being awarded a Ph.D. in 1949, Lane assumed an assistant professorship at Princeton University. He remained there until 1953 when he chose to attend to a family business in Syracuse. He returned to academia in 1960 when he accepted an assistant professorship at the University of California Santa Barbara. Lane was promoted to associate professor of political science in 1964.

=== Consultation and areas of research ===
Lane served as a consultant to the House Select Committee on Lobbying Activities (the Buchanan Committee) of the 81st Congress, which conducted an extensive investigation of the operation of the Federal Regulation of Lobbying Act. In addition to articles in various journals, he wrote the Committee's Report (1950), which has been partially reprinted in several anthologies. During the winter of 1963, when a California State Senate committee undertook a study of lobbying and its regulation by the state, the committee called upon Edgar Lane, who served as a consultant until his death.

Continuing his research into the regulation of lobbying, he brought to completion his book, "Lobbying and the Law," published by the University of California Press in the spring of 1964. The book was reviewed in the National Civic Review and California Law Review.

== Selected works ==
- Lane, Edgar. 1949. "Statutory Regulation of Lobbying in the United States, with Special Reference to the Federal Regulation of Lobbying Act of 1946." Doctoral dissertation, University of Michigan.
- Lane, Edgar. 1950. "Some Lessons from Past Congressional Investigations of Lobbying." The Public Opinion Quarterly 14, no. 1: 14 - 32.
- Lane, Edgar. 1951a. "The Lobby Probe Revisited." Public Relations Journal: 14 - 16.
- Lane, Edgar. 1951b. "Lobbyists and Educators." The Antioch Review 11, no. 3: 313 - 25.
- Lane, Edgar. 1954. "Interest Groups and Bureaucracy." Annals of the American Academy of Political and Social Science 292: 104 - 10.
- Lane, Edgar. 1964a. "Group Politics and the Disclosure Idea." Western Political Quarterly 17, no. 2: 200 - 12.
- Lane, Edgar. 1964b. "Lobbying and the Law." Berkeley: University of California Press.

== Personal life ==
Lane died on July 29, 1964, after a brief illness, leaving behind a wife and three children.
