= Dick Lane Velodrome =

Bicycle Racing Facility

Coordinates: 33.68537°N 84.45193°W

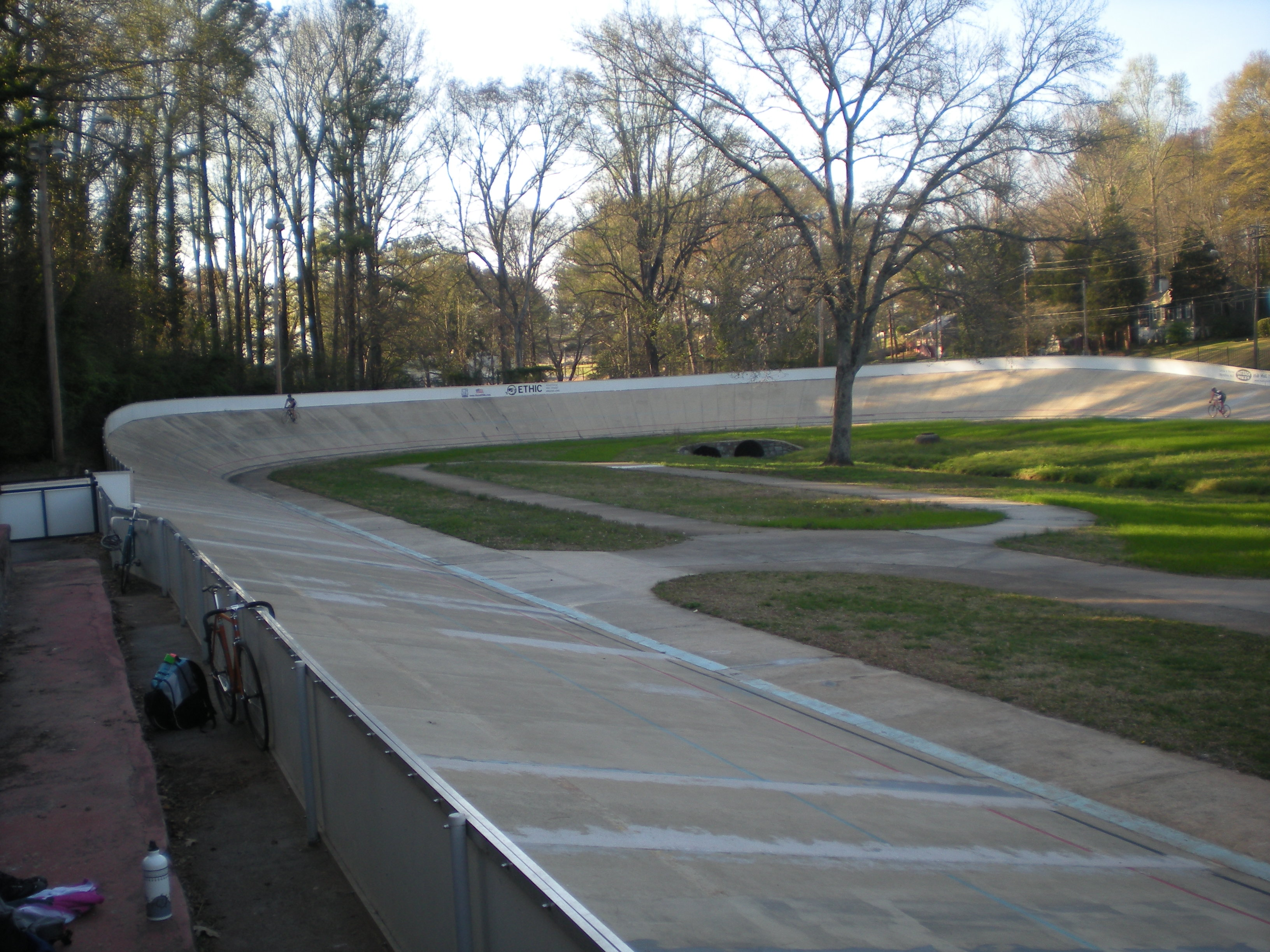
Two riders on track bikes circling Dick Lane Velodrome in East Point, GA.

Dick Lane Velodrome, constructed in 1974, is a bicycle racing facility inspired by a group of residents and City officials that visited the Munich Olympics. Located eight miles south of downtown Atlanta, the Velodrome is 321.8 metres (1,056 ft) with 36° banked concrete track and is based in Sumner Park in a residential part of East Point. The City of East Point owns the facility and has a long-term partnership with East Point Velodrome Association, Inc. (EPVA) to manage it. It is one of 22 active velodromes in the United States.

Dick Lane was the director of the East Point Recreation District and a member of the Georgia State Legislature.

EPVA is a volunteer-based 501(c)3 nonprofit organization dedicated to the rehabilitation, care, and growth of the Dick Lane Velodrome, located in East Point, Georgia. EPVA conducts Youth Service Activities at no cost to the city or state. These activities include a Youth Cycling League (for kids 8-12), Summer Camps (kids 13-16), and Bicycle Safety Clinics.

The Dick Lane Velodrome is a member of the American Track Racing Association (ATRA), the governing body for the majority of velodromes in the country.

The EPVA sits on the board of the Georgia Bicycle Racing Association (GBRA). GBRA is the USA Cycling (USAC) local association for all USAC races in Georgia.

== See also ==
- List of cycling tracks and velodromes
