= Dick Lane (pool player) =

American pool player

Dick Lane is a professional pocket billiards (pool) player from Dallas, Texas. In 1977, he reached the finals of the BCA U.S. Open Straight Pool Championship but lost to Tom Jennings despite leading 196–42 and being only four balls away from the championship.

Lane was the subject of an extensive profile Texas Monthly, which nicknamed him "the Shootist" and described him as Texas's greatest pool players, a two-time Southwest Player of the Year who has won many tournaments and has a run of 324 consecutive balls in straight pool and 9 straight racks in nine ball."

== Titles ==
- 1989 Huebler Cup Open 9-Ball
- 1990 Willard's Spring Classic 9-Ball
- 1990 Houston Open 9-Ball
