= Dick Lane (baseball) =

American baseball player (1927–2018)

- Outfielder
- Born: June 28, 1927; Highland Park, Michigan, U.S.
- Died: September 5, 2018 (aged 91); Lancaster, California, U.S.
- Batted: Right Threw: Right

MLB debut
- June 20, 1949, for the Chicago White Sox

Last MLB appearance
- July 8, 1949, for the Chicago White Sox

MLB statistics
- Batting average: .119
- Home runs: 0
- Runs batted in: 4
- Stats at Baseball Reference

Teams
- Chicago White Sox (1949)

Richard Harrison Lane (June 28, 1927 – September 5, 2018) was an American professional baseball player and a former Major League Baseball left fielder. He was born in Highland Park, Michigan. He appeared in 12 games for the Chicago White Sox during the middle of the 1949 season (June 20–July 8), making his major league debut against the Washington Senators at Griffith Stadium. He batted and threw right-handed, stood 5 feet 11 inches (1.80 m) tall and weighed 178 pounds (81 kg).

In 42 at bats Lane hit just .119 (5-for-42...all singles) with four runs batted in and four runs scored. Five walks, however, pushed his on-base percentage up to .213. Lane handled 27 chances for a fielding percentage of 1.000. Four of his five MLB hits, and three of his four RBIs, came during his first three big league games against Washington, June 22–24. Lane attended the University of Detroit Mercy and his professional career lasted four seasons (1945; 1947–1949).

== See also ==
- Chicago White Sox all-time roster
