= Line =

Line most often refers to:

- In geometry, art, or similar:
  - Line (geometry), an object that has zero thickness and no curvature (i.e. is straight) and stretches to infinity
  - Line segment, a finite piece of an infinite line
  - Line (graphics), a path drawn between two points
- A line of text:
  - See line length in typography
  - Line (text file), a row of characters as a unit of organization within text files
  - Line (poetry), the fundamental unit of poetic composition
- Telephone line, a single-user circuit on a telephone communication system
- Queue area, known in American English as a place to stand "in line"

Line, lines, The Line, or LINE may also refer to:

== Arts, entertainment, and media ==
=== Film ===
- The Line (1938 film) , a Polish drama
- The Line (2009 film), an American action-crime film
- The Line, a 2009 independent film by Nancy Schwartzman
- The Line (2017 film), a Slovak-Ukrainian crime film
- The Line (2022 film), a Swiss, French, and Belgian drama
- The Line (2023 film), an American drama
- Lines (film), a 2016 Greek film

=== Literature ===
==== Terminology ====
- Line (comics), a set of comic books, often with a separate theme or narrative from the main franchise
- Plotline, sequence of connected events in a story

==== Works ====
- The Line (memoir), by Arch and Martin Flanagan
- Line (play), by Israel Horovitz, 1967
- The Line (play), by Timberlake Wertenbaker, 2009
- "Lines" (poem), an 1837 poem by Emily Brontë

=== Music ===
==== Terminology ====
- Line (melody), a linear succession of musical tones that the listener perceives as a single entity
- Line (music) or part, a strand or melody of music played by an individual instrument or voice

==== Albums ====
- Lines (The Walker Brothers album), 1976
- Lines (Pandelis Karayorgis album), 1995
- Lines (Unthanks album), 2018

==== Songs ====
- "Line" (song), 2017 single by Triana Park
- "The Line" (Foo Fighters song), 2017
- "The Line" (Lisa Stansfield song), 1997
- "The Line" (Raye song), 2017
- "The Line", 1995 song by Bruce Springsteen from The Ghost of Tom Joad
- "The Line", 2000 song by Sadist from Lego
- "The Line", 2010 single by Battles
- "LINE", 2015 single by Sukima Switch
- "Line", 2018 song by The Story So Far from Proper Dose
- "The Line", a 2023 song by The Kid Laroi from The First Time
- "The Line", a 2024 song recorded by Twenty One Pilots for Arcane season two
- "Lines" (song), 1976 single by The Walker Brothers
- "Lines", 2007 song by Dead Letter Circus from Dead Letter Circus

=== Television ===
- The Line (game show), a 2014 American game show
- The Line (TV series), a Canadian television series
- "The Line" (Heroes), a 2007 episode of the American television series Heroes
- "The Line" (The Amazing World of Gumball), a 2017 episode of the British-American animated television series The Amazing World of Gumball
- The Line, a 2021 documentary series directed by Jeff Zimbalist and Doug Shultz

=== Other media ===
- The Line (podcast), 2021 by Dan Taberski
- Line dance, a choreographed dance of a group of people

== Business and economics ==
- Above the line (advertising) and below the line, advertisements targeted to either the general public or specific audiences, respectively
- In the context of staff and line functions, business activities that directly advance the main goal, as opposed to staff functions' support role
- A set of related products from the same company:
  - Line of business, products that serve a particular customer transaction or business need
  - Product lining, the offering of several related products for sale
- A line item on a form, such as the bottom line that often represents net income
- A cutoff between categories, such as:
  - Poverty threshold, AKA poverty line or breadline, the amount of income estimated as the minimum needed to afford necessities
- Line management, the direct supervisors of front-line workers
- Line Corporation, a Tokyo-based technology company

== Military ==
- Line (formation), standard tactical formation of forces
- Line infantry, line formation of infantrymen who were part of the "Line Regiments"
- Line officer or officer of the line, an officer with authority to command units
- Fortifications, also called lines
- Line of battle, in naval warfare, a line of warships

== People ==
- Line (given name), a Scandinavian female given name
- Line (surname)
- Lines (surname)
- The Lines family of Birmingham, England, including:
  - Samuel Lines (1778–1863) and his sons
    - Samuel Rostill Lines (1804–1833)
    - Frederick Thomas Lines (1808–1898)
    - Henry Harris Lines (1800 or 1801–1889)

== Places ==
- Líně, a municipality and village in the Czech Republic
- Linesøya, an island, Åfjord, Norway
- The Line, Saudi Arabia, a planned city
- Line Islands, in the central Pacific
- The Line (art trail), London

== Science and technology ==
=== Computing and telecommunications ===
- Transmission line (disambiguation), a structure for transmitting some kind of resource or signal
  - Line level, the standard strength of an audio signal
- Line (video), a measure of video display resolution or image resolution
- Line (software), a social messaging application operated by Line Corporation

=== Other uses in science ===
- Fault line, a geological term
- Inbred line, either of:
  - Inbred strain or linear organisms, model organisms that are nearly genetically identical and are used in laboratories
  - Products of line breeding, a technique in animal and plant agriculture and horticulture
- Lineage (evolution), a sequence of species that form a line of descent
- Long interspersed nuclear element, or LINE, a DNA sequence of two non-overlapping reading frames, accounting for 21% of human DNA
- Maxwell (unit), the unit of magnetic flux, formerly called line

== Sports ==
=== Flexible ligatures ===
- Fishing line, used (or intended) for angling
- Kite line, a string or cord attached to the kite, that is held or attached to an anchor, to prevent it from flying away

=== Competitive sports ===
- Line (ice hockey), a group of forwards that play in a group, or "shift", during a game
- Line and length in cricket, the direction and distance to the first bounce of a delivery
- Line of scrimmage, a boundary in American and Canadian football
- Racing line, the optimal path in motorsports

=== Sports betting ===
- Line in spread betting, number assigned by bookmakers which handicaps one team and favors another when two teams play each other, aka the spread

== Transport ==
- Airline, a company that provides air transport services for traveling passengers and freight
- Log-line, in nautical usage, a piece of rope which has been assigned a function
- Shipping line, a company engaged in sea transport
- Railway line, a railway route or service
- Waterline, the line where the hull of a ship meets the surface of the water

== Other uses ==
- Line (unit), an obsolete unit of length equal to one-twelfth or (later) one-tenth of an inch
- Line (heraldry), used to divide and vary fields and charges in heraldry
- LINE (combat system), a martial arts system
- The Line, a website and social media campaign promoting respectful relationships, run by Our Watch in Australia
- Line Corporation, a Tokyo-based technology company

== See also ==
- Writing lines, a form of school punishment
- A-line (disambiguation)
- Line cook, a chef who works a station in a professional restaurant
- Bottom line (disambiguation)
- Linear (disambiguation)
- Liner (disambiguation)
- Lining (disambiguation)
- Lyne (disambiguation)
- Iine (disambiguation)
