= Lines (surname) =

Lines is a matronymic, English surname, a form of the given name Line with genitival or post-medieval excrescent -s.

Notable people with the surname include:

- Aaran Lines (born 1976), New Zealand footballer
- Aaron Lines (born 1977), Canadian country musician
- Andy Lines (born 1960), British Anglican bishop
- Barry Lines (1942–2023), English footballer
- Chris Lines (born 1985), English footballer
- Dick Lines (born 1938), Canadian baseball player
- Disco Lines (born 1999), American DJ and producer
- Donald Lines Jacobus (1887–1970), American genealogist and historian
- Dorolyn Lines (1901–1975), American irrigation engineer
- Edwin Stevens Lines (1845–1927), American Episcopal bishop
- Frederick Thomas Lines (1808–1898), English portrait painter
- Georgia Lines (born 1996), New Zealand singer-songwriter
- Helen Lines, American astronomer
- Henry Harris Lines (1800/01–1889), British painter
- Ian Lines (born 1965), British croquet player
- Jennifer Lines, Canadian theatre and television actress
- Jonathan Lines, American businessman and politician
- Joseph H. Lines (1870–1961), American politician
- Judi Lines (born 1951), British broadcaster
- Kathleen Lines (1902–1988), Canadian writer
- Lisa Lines, Australian historian
- Marian Lines (1933–2012), British writer and librettist
- Mary Lines (1893–1978), British athlete
- Maureen Lines (1937-2017), British author and environmentalist
- Mike Lines (born 1970), American lacrosse coach
- Oliver Lines (born 1995), English snooker player
- Peter Lines (born 1969), English snooker player
- Richard Lines (toy manufacturer) (1929–2020), British toy manufacturer
- Richard D. Lines (1916–1992), American astronomer
- Roland Walter Lines (1877–1916), English architect
- Samuel Lines (1778–1863), English designer, painter and art teacher
- Samuel Rostill Lines (1804–1833), English painter
- Stanley Lines (1918–1975), Bermudian sprinter
- Steven Lines (born 1963), English cricketer
- Stewart Lines (born 1963), British racing driver
- Sue Lines (born 1953), Australian politician
- William J. Lines, Australian author
- Wilton Lines (fl. 1889–1890), English footballer

== See also ==
- Lines (disambiguation)
- Line (surname)
- Lynas (surname)
- Lyne (surname)
- Lynes (surname)
- Lyness (surname)
