= Bottom line (disambiguation) =

Bottom line is an informal name for a company's net income, which is typically printed on the last line of the company's income statement.

Bottom line or the bottom line may also refer to:

== Arts, media and entertainment ==
- The Bottom Line (Australian TV series), an Australian leadership discussion program on Channel Nine
- The Bottom Line (media), a Slovenian online investigative media website
- ESPN BottomLine, ESPN's lower-third sports information ticker
- The Bottom Line, the original title of Across the Line, a long-running music show on BBC Radio Ulster
- The Bottom Line, a business radio programme on BBC Radio 4 – see Evan Davis § The Bottom Line programme
- The Bottom Line, U.S. politics discussion program by Al Jazeera English
- The Bottomline with Boy Abunda, a talk show in the Philippines on ABS-CBN
- WWE Bottom Line, a wrestling television show, named after the catchphrase of Stone Cold Steve Austin

=== Music ===
- Bottom Line (album), a 1979 album by John Mayall
- The Bottom Line (Bryant University), a collegiate a cappella group at Bryant University

==== Songs ====
- "Bottom Line", by Diana Ross from her 1989 album Workin' Overtime
- "Bottom Line", by Martin Solveig from his 2008 album C'est La Vie
- "Bottom Line", by Ratt from their 1988 album Reach for the Sky
- "Bottom Line", by Raven from their 1985 album Stay Hard
- "Bottom Line", by Swollen Members from their 2003 album Heavy
- "Bottom Line", by the 77s from their 1987 album The 77s
- "The Bottom Line", by Alanis Morissette, a demo for 1995's Jagged Little Pill
- "The Bottom Line" (song), a 1985 song by Big Audio Dynamite
- "The Bottom Line", by David Lee Roth from his 1988 album Skyscraper
- "The Bottom Line", by Depeche Mode from their 1997 album Ultra

== Other uses ==
- Bottom Line Inc., an American publisher of books, newsletters and web articles
- The Bottom Line (venue), a performance venue in New York City's Greenwich Village from 1974 to 2004
- Bottom line, the "tail-female" line of descent (traced only through females), reflecting that line's position at the bottom of tabulated pedigrees in horse breeding

== See also ==
- Bottom line mentality, in psychology
- "Land of the Bottom Line", by John Gorka from his 1990 album Land of the Bottom Line
- Double bottom line, a business term used in socially responsible enterprise and investment
- Triple bottom line, a business term used in measuring organizational (and societal) success: economic, environmental and social
- BLUF (communication) (bottom line up front)
