= Lynas (surname) =

Lynas is a matronymic, English surname, a form of the given name Line with genitival or post-medieval excrescent -s.

Notable people with the surname include:

- Aron Lynas (born 1996), Scottish footballer
- G. Augustine Lynas, American modern sculptor
- George Lynas (1832–1896), English cricketer
- Hugh Lynas (1865–1938), British trade unionist
- Jim Lynas (born 1942), Scottish footballer
- Johnny Lynas (1907–1988), Scottish footballer
- Lisa Lynas (born 1981), Northern Irish badminton player
- Mark Lynas (born 1973), British author and journalist
- Michael Lynas (born 1981), British chief executive
- Norman Lynas (born 1955), Irish Anglican dean
- Ralph Lynas (1904–1992), Irish footballer

== See also ==
- Line (surname)
- Lines (surname)
- Lyne (surname)
- Lynes (surname)
- Lyness (surname)
