= Helpline (disambiguation) =

A helpline is a telephone service which offers help to those who call.

Helpline may also refer to:

- Helpline (film), a 2004 short film
- "Helpline" (song), a 2017 song by Mura Masa from the eponymous album Mura Masa
- Helpline Telecoms Nigeria Limited (a.k.a. "Helpline"), a Nigerian company offering online virtual e-vouchers and e-cards
- 116 helplines in Europe

== See also ==
- Emergency telephone number
  - List of emergency telephone numbers
- List of suicide helplines
- Hotline (disambiguation)
- Help (disambiguation)
- Line (disambiguation)
