= Lynes (surname) =

Lynes is a matronymic, English and Irish surname, a variation of Lines, a form of the given name Line with genitival or post-medieval excrescent -s.

Notable people with the name include:

- Barbara Buhler Lynes (born 1942), American art historian
- Colin Lynes (born 1977), English boxer
- Craig Lynes (born 1981), Scottish footballer
- Frank Lynes (1858–1913), American composer and teacher
- George Platt Lynes (1907–1955), American photographer
- Hubert Lynes (1874–1942), British admiral
- J. Kendall Lynes (1903–1962), American politician
- Jeanette Lynes, Canadian author, poet and professor
- John Lynes (born 1872), English cricketer
- Maggie Lynes (born 1963), British athletics competitor
- Martin Lynes (born 1967), Australian actor
- Robyn Lynes, Bahamian politician
- Russell Lynes (1910–1991), American art historian
- Samuel Lynes (1822–1878), American physician
- Sandra Lynes, Canadian para-alpine skier
- Tony Lynes (1929–2014), British writer and social campaigner
- William Lynes (1893–1963), American politician

== See also ==
- Lynes (disambiguation)
- Line (surname)
- Lines (surname)
- Lynas (surname)
- Lyne (surname)
- Lyness (surname)
