= Lyness (surname) =

Lyness is a matronymic, English and Irish surname, a variation of Lines, a form of the given name Line with genitival or post-medieval excrescent -s.

Notable people with the name include:

- Dean Lyness (born 1991), English footballer
- Given Lyness (born 1937), Irish cricketer
- Leslie Lyness (born 1968), American field hockey player
- Randy Lyness (born 1951), American politician
- Samuel Lyness Howe (1864–1939), Canadian politician

== See also ==
- Line (surname)
- Lines (surname)
- Lynas (surname)
- Lyne (surname)
- Lynes (surname)
