= Lines family =

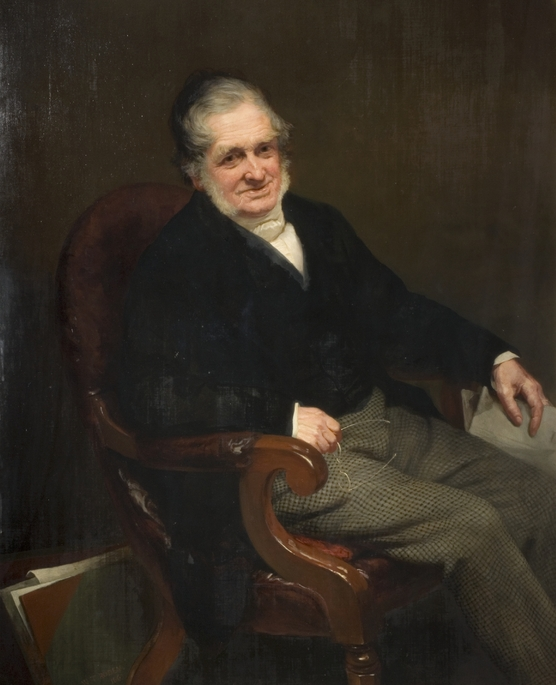
Samuel Lines, paterfamilias of the Lines family; 1863 portrait by William Thomas Roden

The Lines family was a family in Birmingham, England, which included several notable artists, who are considered members of the Birmingham School. These included:

- Samuel Lines (1778–1863) and his sons
  - Henry Harris Lines (1800 or 1801–1889)
  - William Rostill Lines (1802–1846)
  - Samuel Rostill Lines (1804–1833)
  - Edward Ashcroft Lines (1807–1875)
  - Frederick Thomas Lines (1808-1898)

A significant collection of their work is held by the Royal Birmingham Society of Artists; other works are in Birmingham Museum and Art Gallery.
