= Lyne (surname) =

Lyne is an English surname, possibly with a matronymic origin from the Middle English female personal name Line.

Notable people with the surname include:

- Adrian Lyne (born 1941), English film director
- Andrew Lyne (born 1942), British physicist
- Arthur W. Lyne (1884–1971), British politician
- Becky Lyne (born 1982), English middle-distance runner
- Carmichael Lyne (1861–1929), Australian politician
- Charlie Lyne (born 1991), English filmmaker, artist and film critic
- Clifford Lyne (born 1970), South African swimmer
- Conor Lyne (born 1993), Irish alpine skier
- Dinny Lyne (1920–2001), Kerry Gaelic footballer
- Dominic Lyne (born 1983), British writer
- Doris Lyne Officer (1898-1967), English-Australian physician and paediatrician
- Felice Lyne (1887–1935), American opera singer
- Greg Lyne (1946–2022), American music academic
- Horace Lyne (1860–1949), Wales international rugby union player
- Ingrid Lyne (1975–2016), American nurse and murder victim
- Jackie Lyne (1923–1993), Irish Gaelic football player
- Jennifer Lyne (born 1972), England international rugby union player
- Jerry Lyne, American basketball player and coach
- John Lyne (1810–1900), Australian politician
- Jonathan Lyne (born 1990), Irish Gaelic footballer
- Joseph Leycester Lyne (1837–1908), Anglican Benedictine monk
- June Lyne (1931–2019), American politician
- Lanham Lyne (born 1955), American politician
- Lewis Lyne (1899–1970), British Army general
- Michael Lyne (1919-1997), Royal Air Force Air-Vice Marshal
- Neil Lyne (born 1970), English footballer
- Oliver Lyne (1944–2005), British classical scholar
- Phil Lyne (born 1947), American rodeo cowboy
- Philip Lyne (died 1726), Pirate
- Reece Lyne (born 1992), England rugby league footballer
- Richard Lyne (fl. 1570–1600), English painter and engraver
- Robert Lyne (1885–1957), Welsh field hockey player
- Roderic Lyne (born 1948), British diplomat
- Sandford Lyne (1945–2007), American poet
- Susan Lyne (born 1951), American business executive and Entrepreneur
- Tadhg Lyne (1930–2000), Irish Gaelic footballer
- Terri Lyne Carrington (born 1965), American drummer
- Thomas Lyne (1869–1955), Royal Navy officer
- Timothy Joseph Lyne (1919–2013), American prelate
- William Lyne (1844–1913), Australian politician
- William Lyne Crawford (1839–1920), American politician
- William Lyne Wilson (1843–1900), American politician and lawyer

== See also ==
- Lyne (disambiguation)
- Line (surname)
- Lines (surname)
- Lynas (surname)
- Lynes (surname)
- Lyness (surname)
