= Line (surname) =

Line is a matronymic, English surname originating from the Middle English female personal name Line.

Notable people with the surname include:

- Anne Line (c. 1563–1601), English Catholic martyr
- Bill Line (born 1948), American football player
- Dave Line (1942–1980), British author
- Donald De Line (born 1957), American film producer
- Elizabeth Line (gymnast) (born 1985), British gymnast
- Frances Line (1940–2021), British broadcasting executive
- Francis Line (1595–1675), English Jesuit priest
- Henry Line, Irish Anglican priest
- Jason Line (born 1969), American drag racing driver
- Jim Line (1926–2013), American basketball player
- Lorie Line (born 1958), American musician
- Marie Line, French singer
- Maurice Line (1928–2010), English librarian
- Molly Line (born 1977), American news correspondent
- Peter Line (bowls) (1930–2025), English lawn and indoor bowler
- Peter Line (snowboarder) (born 1974), American snowboarder
- Simon Line (born 1971), English footballer and manager
- Wendy Line, British lawn bowler
- Zach Line (born 1990), American football player and coach

== See also ==
- Line (disambiguation)
- Line (given name)
- Lines (surname)
- Lynas (surname)
- Lyne (surname)
- Lynes (surname)
- Lyness (surname)
