= Vennesland =

Vennesland is a Norwegian surname. Notable people with the surname include:

- Birgit Vennesland (1913—2001), Norwegian-American biochemist
- Line Vennesland (born 1985), Norwegian politician
