= Li Ning (disambiguation) =

Li Ning is a Chinese gymnast and entrepreneur.

- Li-Ning, the sportswear company founded by him

Li Ning or Ning Li may also refer to:

- Li Ning (Tang dynasty) (793–812), Tang prince
- Li Ning (engineer) (born 1958), Chinese petroleum engineer
- Ning Li (physicist), Chinese-American physicist
- Li Ning (baseball) (born 1994), Chinese baseball player
- Li Ning (footballer) (born 2001), Chinese footballer

== See also ==
- Lining (disambiguation)
