= Dreamboat (disambiguation) =

"Dreamboat" is a popular song written by Jack Hoffman and recorded by Alma Cogan in 1955.

Dreamboat may also refer to:

== Films ==
- Dreamboat (film), a 1952 comedy starring Clifton Webb

== Music ==
- Dreamboat, a 1975 album by George Baker Selection
- "Dreamboat", a 1973 song by Limmie & the Family Cooking
- "Dreamboat", a 1978 song by Elton John from Too Low for Zero
- "Dreamboat", a 1979 song by John Mayall from Bottom Line
- "Dreamboat", a 1993 song by The Crabs
- "(He's My) Dreamboat", a 1961 song by Connie Francis
