= Lyne =

Lyne may refer to:

== Places ==
- Division of Lyne, an electoral division in New South Wales, Australia
- Lyne, Denmark, a town in southwest Denmark
- Lyne, Surrey a village in southern England
- River Lyne, a river of Cumbria in England
- Lyne, Scottish Borders, a small village in Scotland

== Other uses ==
- Lyne (surname) (including a list of people with the name)
- Lyne Chantal Boudreau, Canadian politician
- Lyne Renée (born 1979), Belgian actress
- Lyne Place, a Regency house in Surrey, England, part of Holloway Sanatorium

== See also ==
- Ashton-under-Lyne, a market town in the Metropolitan Borough of Tameside, Greater Manchester, England
- Lynn (disambiguation)
- Lynne (disambiguation)
- Ó Laighin, an Irish surname sometimes anglicized as Lyne
