= Hotline (disambiguation) =

A hotline is a point-to-point communications link in which a call is automatically directed to the preselected destination.

Hotline or Hot Line may also refer to:

== Telephonic services ==
- Helpline, any telephone service which offers help to those who call
- Crisis hotline, a telephone service which offers help to those who call
- Phone sex services, the business of erotic talks by phone
- Moscow–Washington hotline, a system that allows direct communication between the leaders of the United States and Russia

== Music ==
=== Albums ===
- Hotline (The J. Geils Band album), 1975
- Hotline (Nazia and Zohaib Hassan album), 1987
- Hotline (White Heart album)
- Hot Line (album), a 1964 album by Bill Barron

=== Songs ===
- "Hot Line" (song), a 1976 disco song performed by the American musical group The Sylvers
- "Hotline" (Psychic Fever song), 2021
- "Hotline" (XO song), 2026
- "Hotline", a 2004 song recorded by Ciara for her debut album, Goodies
- "Hotline", a 2022 song from Hummingbird (Black Party album)

== Film ==
- Hot Line (film), a 1968 comedy spy thriller
- Hotline (1982 film), a 1982 made-for-TV thriller film
- Hotline (2014 film), a 2014 film
- The Hotline (film), a 1974 Australian TV film

== Other uses ==
- The Hotline, a daily political briefing published in Washington, D.C.
- Hot Line (TV series), an American erotic anthology series featured on Cinemax
- Hotlines, an American reality television series broadcast by Spike TV
- Hotline Communications, a software company, and their Hotline Connect program suite
- "The Hot Line", a trio of hockey players in Bobby Hull, Anders Hedberg and Ulf Nilsson that played for the Winnipeg Jets

== See also ==
- Helpline (disambiguation)
- Line (disambiguation)
- Hot (disambiguation)
