= Iine =

Iine or IINE may refer to:

- "Iine!", a song by Babymetal on the 2012 single Babymetal / Kiba of Akiba
- Iine!, a 2013 album by Greeeen
- "#Iine!", a 2017 song by Tomomi Itano

== See also ==
- Line (disambiguation)
- Yine (disambiguation)
