= Lining =

Lining may refer to:

- Lining (sewing), the process of inserting an inner layer of fabric, fur, or other material
- Lining of paintings, the process of restoration paintings by attaching a new canvas to the back of the existing one
- Brake lining, consumable surfaces in brake systems
- Product lining, offering for sale several related products
- Roof lining, in an automobile roof
- Antonio Lining (born 1963), Filipino pool player
- Lining (steamboat), a method used by river boats to transit otherwise impassable falls and rapids
- Lining figures, a typeface whose numerals are all the same height
- Lining out, a form of a cappella hymn-singing

== See also ==
- Li-Ning, Chinese sportswear company
- Li Ning (disambiguation)
- Line (disambiguation)
