= Ó Laighin =

Ó Laighin, Gaelic-Irish surname, anglicised as Lyons, Lane or Lyne.

== Overview ==
Ó Laighin was the surname of two unrelated families in medieval Ireland.

1 - Ó Laighin of County Kerry, usually anglicised as Lyne or Leen.

2 - Ó Laighin of County Galway, their home district been around Kilconnell. Now rendered as Lyons or Lane.

Over two hundred households of the latter family were recorded between 1847 and 1864.

== Etymology ==
Ó Laighin means “descendant of Laighean”, a name derived from the Irish “láighe” or "láigen" meaning “spear" or "lance.”

== Notable people ==
- Pádraig B. Ó Laighin, academic in sociology, poet and advocate for the Irish language.

== See also ==
- Donal Lyons, Mayor of Galway, 2001–2002.
- Mossie Lyons, Kerry footballer.
- Tadhg Lyne, Kerry footballer, c. 1933 – 31 May 2000.
- Hugh Lane, Irish art enthusiast, 1875 - 1915.
