= Yine =

Yine may refer to:

- Yine people, an ethnic group of the Amazon
- Yine language, an Arawakan language

== See also ==
- Iine (disambiguation)
