= Morten Eskesen =

Danish author, composer and teacher

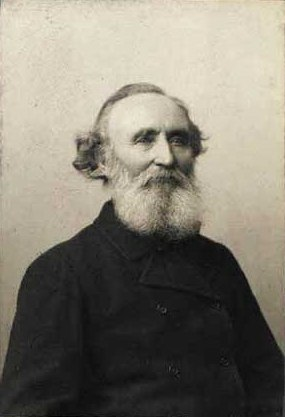
Morten Eskeson

Morten Eskesen (5 January 1826 - 8 February 1913) was a Danish author, composer and teacher in independent and folk high schools.

== Early life ==
Erikesen was born in Ulbæk in the parish of Lyne between Skjern and Varde in west Jutland. His parents, Eske Mortensen and Margrete Pedersdatter, were farm owners. From age 14 to 20, he worked at the farm during summer and as an assistant teacher and tutor during winter.

He received his teaching diploma from Snedsted College in 1848.

== Career ==
From 1851 to 1853 was a schoolteacher in Bevtoft in southern Jutland, where he met the politician Hans Andersen Kruger. This gave him an interest in the South Jutlandic dialect. He was a teacher in west Jutland and then a tutor and folk high school teacher in different parts of the country. He associated with Christen Mikkelsen Kold, who is credited with setting the model for Danish schools, and N. F. S. Grundtvig. From 1853 to 1854 Eskesen was the folk high school superintendent in Uth, near Horsens in east Jutland. From 1856 to 1858 he was a teacher at Grundtvig's folk high school in Marielyst. Between 1858 and 1884 he was an independent school leader on Funen, first in Rudme and then in Odense.

In 1874 he published a widely used songbook Nordiske Sange til brug ved Folkemøder, Skytteforeninger og i Skoler samlede af Morten Eskesen (lit: Nordic Songs to use in Folk Meetings, Shooting Associations and Schools, Gathered Together by Morten Eskesen), which was reprinted in several enhanced editions in the following years. From 1869 to 1876 he edited the weekly magazine Fylla, dealing with matters related to independent schools and folk high schools. In 1890 he released a collection of 80 songs and tunes.

He collected folk songs from various sources, some of which he recorded on a phonograph in 1907. He participated in meetings at folk high schools and elsewhere. He published many books during his lifetime. Eskesen died in Arhus in 1913.

== Legacy ==
Morten Eskesen was introduced to the ideas of N. F. S. Grundtvig during childhood. This influence manifested in later life as staunch nationalism, leading him to be considered a fanatic in some circles. Grundtvig was the person who sent Eskesen to teach at the university in Marielyst. The university was later renamed Grundtvig University.

== See also ==
- List of Danish composers
