= Frederik Heiselberg =

Danish footballer (born 2003)

Personal information
- Full name: Frederik Emil Hedegaard Heiselberg
- Date of birth: 11 February 2003 (age 23)
- Place of birth: Lyne, Denmark
- Height: 1.91 m (6 ft 3 in)
- Position: Forward

Team information
- Current team: Hillerød
- Number: 9

Youth career
- Strellev Lyne GU
- Tarm IF
- Midtjylland

Senior career*
Years	Team	Apps	(Gls)
2022–2025	Midtjylland	10	(1)
2022	→ Fredericia (loan)	16	(3)
2023–2024	→ Horsens (loan)	17	(0)
2025–2026	Aalesund	24	(2)
2026–	Hillerød	14	(5)

International career
2020	Denmark U-17	2	(0)
2022	Denmark U-19	1	(1)
- * Club domestic league appearances and goals as of 2 June 2026

Frederik Emil Hedegaard Heiselberg (born 11 February 2003) is a Danish footballer who plays as a forward for Danish club Hillerød. He is the son of former footballer, Kim Heiselberg.

== Club career ==
=== FC Midtjylland ===
Frederik Heiselberg played for partner clubs Strellev Lyne GU and Tarm IF before moving to FC Midtjylland. He fought his way up through Midtjylland's youth ranks. In June 2021, he signed a new long-term deal with Midtjylland until June 2025. At the same time, Heiselberg was also promoted to the first team. However, two serious injuries put an end to Heiselberg's season. From April 2022 he was back and from April onwards he scored ten goals in ten games in the U19 League.

Ahead of the 2022–23 season, still yet to make his Midtjylland debut, Heiselberg was loaned out to Danish 1st Division club FC Fredericia until the end of the season. However, on 4 January 2023 Midtjylland announced, that Heiselberg had been recalled and also signed a new long-term deal until the end of 2027.

After his return to Midtjylland, Heiselberg made his official debut for Midtjylland against Brøndby IF in the Danish Superliga on 27 February 2023. Heiselberg scored his first goal for his club on 31 March 2023 against OB.

On 21 July 2023, Heiselberg joined newly relegated Danish 1st Division side AC Horsens on a one-year loan deal. On May 30, 2024, the club confirmed that Heiselberg will return to Midtjylland after the end of the loan speel. However, the spell was cut short, as Heisselberg a bad injury in February 2024. After 10 months, Heiselberg was back on the pitch again in November 2024 when he made his comeback in a reserve team match for Midtjylland.

=== Aalesund ===
On 4 March 2025, Heiselberg joined Aalesund in Norway.

=== Hillerød ===
On 30 January 2026, Heiselberg joined Danish 1st Division side Hillerød on a deal until June 2028.

== Career statistics ==
=== Club ===
As of match played 1 December 2023

Appearances and goals by club, season and competition
Club	Season	League			Danish Cup		Continental		Total	
Club	Season	Division	Apps	Goals	Apps	Goals	Apps	Goals	Apps	Goals
Midtjylland	2021-22	Danish Superliga	0	0	0	0	0	0	0	0
Midtjylland	2022-23	Danish Superliga	10	1	0	0	2 (Note: Appearance(s) in UEFA Europa League)	0	12	1
Midtjylland	2023-24	Danish Superliga	0	0	0	0	0	0	0	0
Midtjylland	2024-25	Danish Superliga	0	0	0	0	0	0	0	0
Midtjylland	Total		10	1	0	0	2	0	12	1
Fredericia (loan)	2022-23	Danish 1st Division	16	3	2	3	—		18	6
Horsens (loan)	2023-24	Danish 1st Division	17	0	1	0	—		18	0
Career total			43	4	3	3	2	0	48	5
