= Christen Mikkelsen Kold =

Danish teacher (1816–1870)

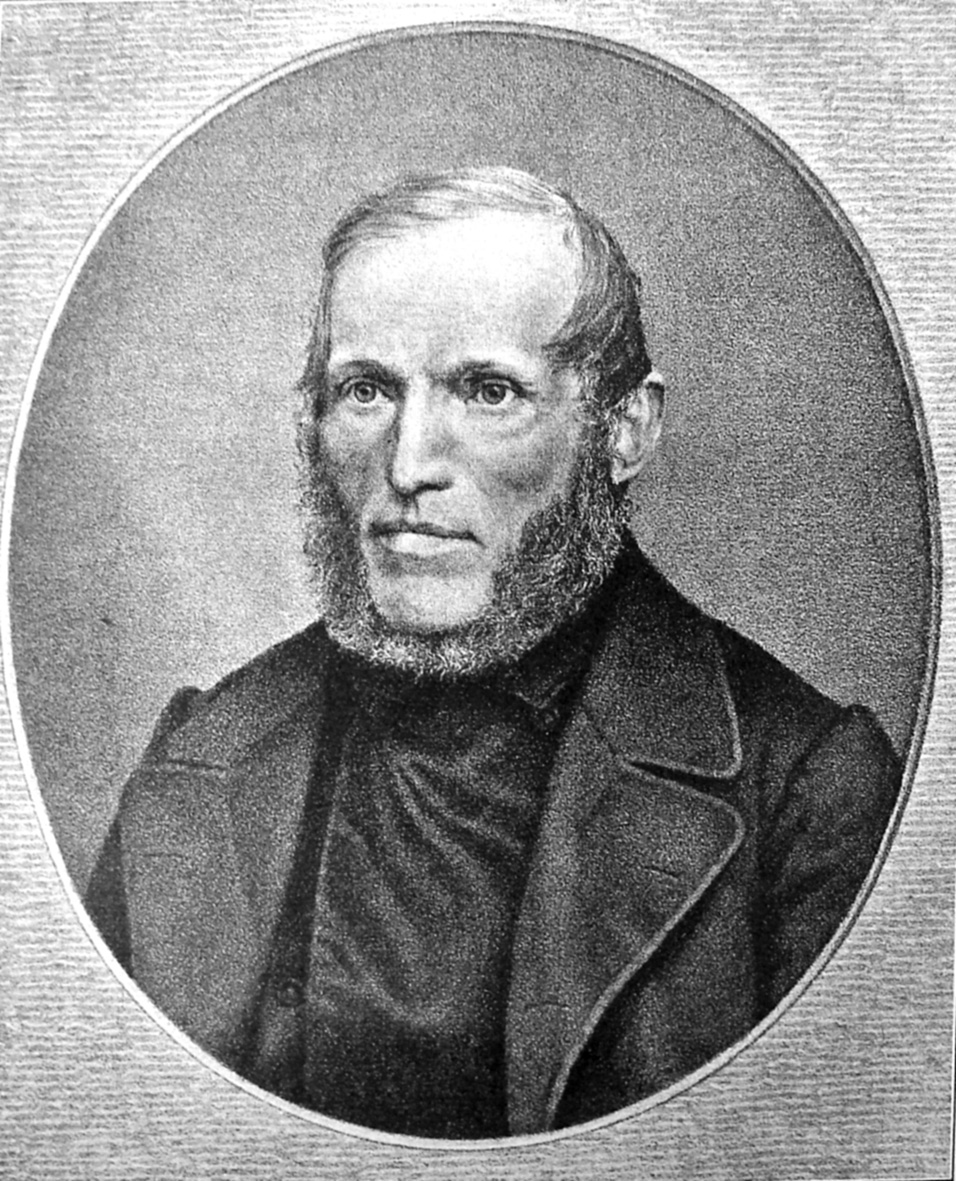
- Born: 29 March 1816; Thisted, Jutland, Denmark
- Died: 6 April 1870 (aged 54); Dalum, Funen, Denmark
- Other names: Kristen Mikkelsen Kold
- Education: Teacher
- Occupation: Educator
- Known for: Creation of the Danish folk high school system
- Parent(s): Father Mikkel Christensen Kold, a shoemaker

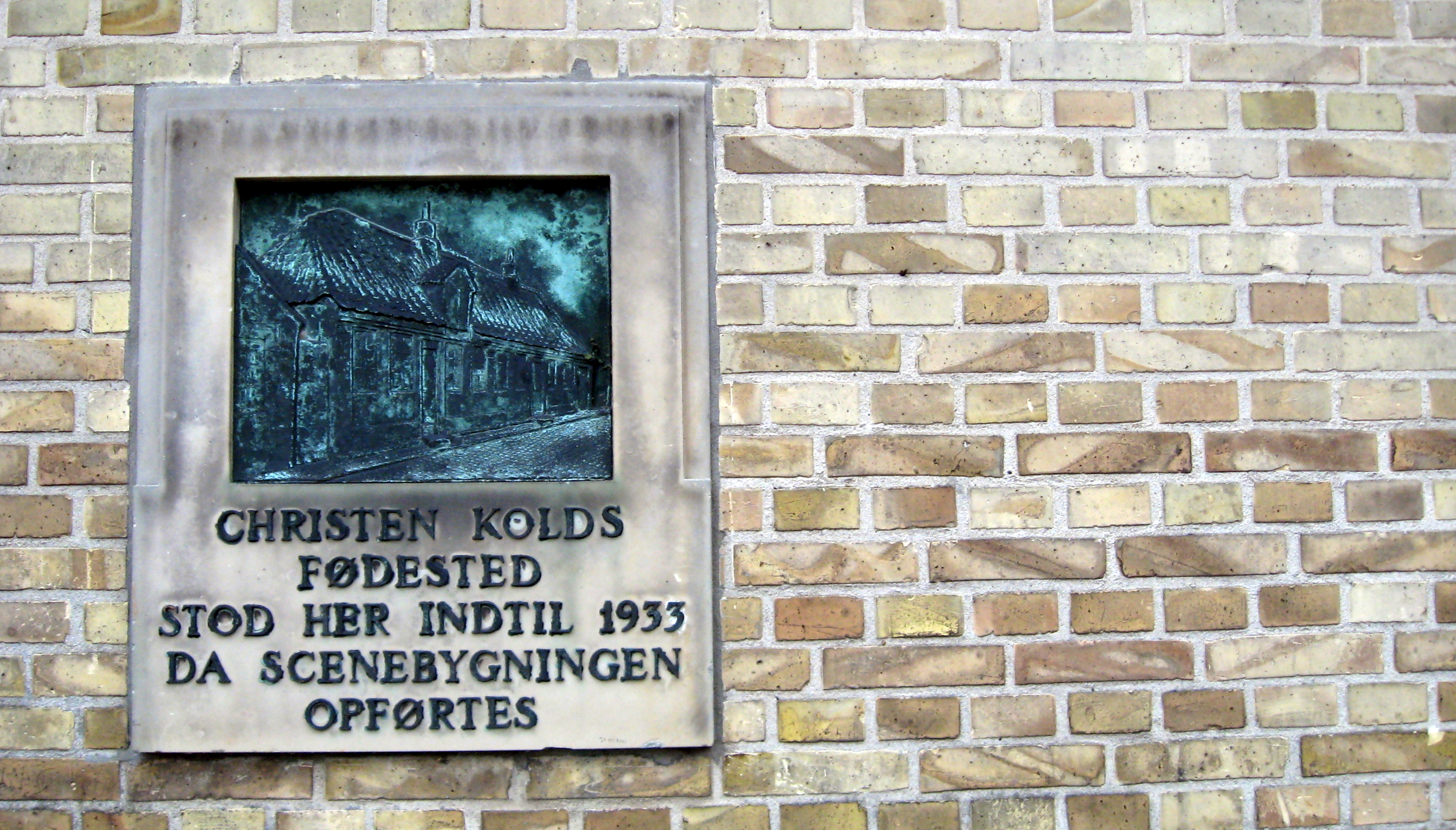
A commemorative plaque for Christen Kold in Thisted

Christen Mikkelsen Kold (sometimes spelled Kristen or Cristen; 29 March 1816 — 6 April 1870) was a Danish teacher, notable for creating the Danish Folk high school system, for non-degree education of adults.

Kold was born in Thisted, Jutland.

Unsatisfied with the education system of Denmark at the time, he founded a school in Ryslinge in 1851, which later became a model for the folk high-school system. His work has to be seen in context with that of N. F. S. Grundtvig. He associated with Morten Eskesen.

Kold died in Dalum, Funen.
