= Lynes =

Lynes may refer to:

- Lynes (surname), a list of people with the name
- W.F. Lynes Parkway, auxiliary Interstate Highway in and near Savannah, Georgia (United States)
