= Lyne, Denmark =

Lyne
- Village
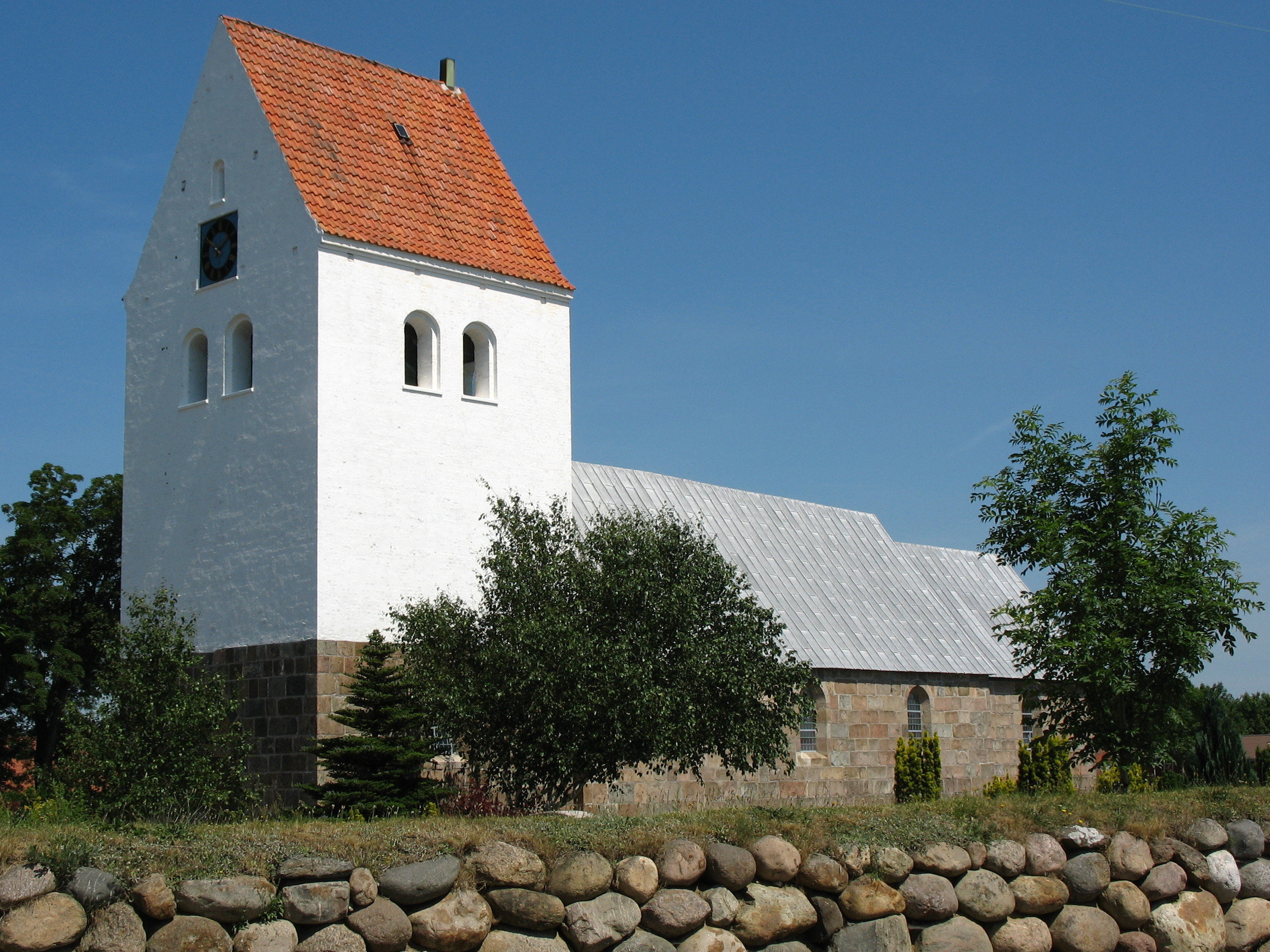
- Lyne Church

- Location within Central Denmark Region Location within Denmark
- Coordinates: 55°48′8″N 8°29′32″E
- Country: Denmark
- Region: Central Denmark (Midtjylland)
- Municipality: Ringkøbing-Skjern

Population (2026)
  - Total: 231

Lyne is a small village with a population of 231 (1 January 2026) in Ringkøbing-Skjern Municipality, on the peninsula of Jutland in southwest Denmark.

Lyne is located 10 km west of Ølgod, 12 km south of Tarm and 39 km north of Esbjerg, at the Danish national road 11.

Lyne Church, built in granite ashlar, is located in the village.

== Notable people ==
- Morten Eskesen
- Frederik Heiselberg
