= Ralph Lynas =

Irish footballer (1904–1992)

Personal information
- Full name: Ralph John Langtrey Lynas
- Date of birth: 29 February 1904
- Place of birth: Belfast, Ireland
- Date of death: 1992 (aged 87–88)
- Position: Inside forward

Senior career*
Years	Team	Apps	(Gls)
1923–1924	Glenrosa		
1924–1925	Cliftonville		
1925–1927	Nottingham Forest	20	(2)
1927–1928	Ards		
1928–1929	Broadway United		
1930–1931	Carrickfergus		
Total		20	(2)
- * Club domestic league appearances and goals

Ralph John Langtrey Lynas (29 February 1904–1992) was an Irish footballer who played in the Football League for Nottingham Forest.
