= Li Ning (engineer) =

Chinese engineer

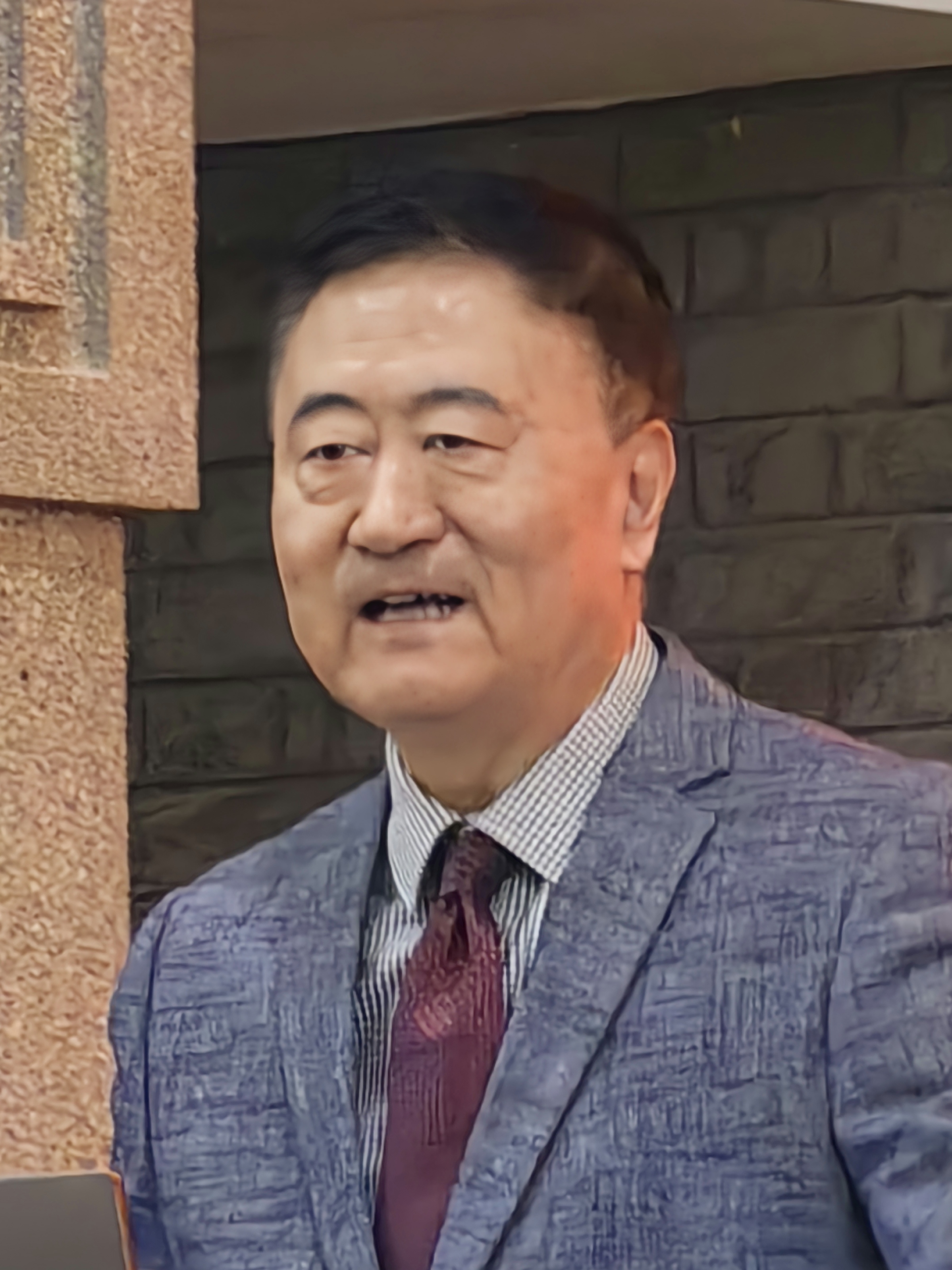
- Born: July 1958 (age 68); Huan County, Gansu, China
- Education: China University of Petroleum
- Scientific career
- Fields: Hydrocarbon exploration
- Workplaces: Research Institute of Petroleum Exploration and Development (RIPED)
- Doctoral advisor: Wen Wenbo; Tan Tingdong

Chinese name
- Traditional Chinese: 李寧
- Simplified Chinese: 李宁
Transcriptions
Standard Mandarin
- Hanyu Pinyin: Lǐ Níng

Li Ning (Chinese: 李宁; born July 1958) is a Chinese engineer specializing in hydrocarbon exploration. He is an academician of the Chinese Academy of Engineering (CAE) and serves as deputy director of the Institute of Well-Logging and Remote Sensing, Research Institute of Petroleum Exploration and Development (RIPED).

== Biography ==
Li was born in Huan County, Gansu in July 1958. He secondary studied at Huan County No.1 High School. After the resumption of National College Entrance Examination, he enrolled at Huadong Petroleum Institute (now China University of Petroleum). He obtained a doctor's degree in geophysical logging under the supervision of Wen Wenbo and Tan Tingdong (谭廷栋). From January 1989 to January 1991 he was a postdoctoral fellow at the Institute of Geology and Geophysics, Chinese Academy of Sciences (IGGCAS). After graduation, he joined the Research Institute of Petroleum Exploration and Development (RIPED). In 2017, he became a visiting professor at the China University of Petroleum. On December 6, 2019, he was haired as a distinguished professor at Anhui University of Science and Technology.

== Honours and awards ==
- 1992 China Youth Science and Technology Award
- November 22, 2019 Member of the Chinese Academy of Engineering (CAE)
