= Line Jensen =

Line Jensen may refer to:

- Line Jensen (triathlete) (born 1981), Danish triathlete
- Line Sigvardsen Jensen (born 1991), Danish footballer
