= Transmission line (disambiguation) =

A transmission line is a structure for carrying electromagnetic waves, especially radio waves.

It may also refer to:

- a power transmission line, a structure for transmitting electrical energy
- an acoustic transmission line, a structure for transmitting sound
