= The Bottom Line (media) =

Slovenian independent and non-profit online investigative media

- Website type: News website
- Available in: Slovenian
- Owner: Non-profit
- Editor: Anže Boštic
- Website: podcrto.si
- Commercial: No
- Launched: September 2014

The Bottom Line (in Slovenian, Pod črto) is a Slovenian independent and non-profit online investigative media. It was founded in September 2014.

It is free for readers to access its content and is funded through donations. It has been awarded a Shuttleworth Foundation flash grant and a grant by Open Society Foundations.
