= Helpline (film) =

2004 film directed by Jiro Ghianni

Helpline!
- Directed by: Jiro Ghianni (as Joli(e))
- Written by: Jiro Ghianni (as Joli(e))
- Release date: 2004
- Running time: 4 minutes
- Country: Netherlands
- Language: English

Helpline! is a 2004 queer short film from the Netherlands written and directed by Joli(e) (pseudonym of Jiro Ghianni). It is a short experimental animation that was produced for Queeruption 2004.

The film explores the idea of bare-chested-ness. Should everyone in a Western society be able to walk around bare-chested, or just the boys? Is this fair? The director used her/his "pre-testosterone" voice in narrating the voice-over that accompanies the animation.

== See also ==
- List of transgender people
- List of gay, lesbian or bisexual people
- Category:Transgender people
- Transgender in film and television
