= The Bottom Line (Bryant University) =

The Bottom Line is Bryant University's premier co-ed a cappella group. Founded in 2006, this award winning, student run organization performs at various events both on and off Bryant's campus during the course of the school year. The group performs a wide range of contemporary music which is voted on and selected by the members. To be granted membership in the group, students must demonstrate their musical ability in an audition process and callback.

== International Championship of Collegiate A Cappella (ICCA) ==
The Bottom Line was accepted into the International Championship of Collegiate A Cappella six times, competing in the Northeast Region Quarterfinals in 2017, 2018, 2019, 2021, 2023, and 2024. On February 24, 2018, the group finished in second place in their Northeast Quarterfinal at Central Connecticut State University, with Maxwell Pudvar earning an award for Outstanding Vocal Percussion. The group advanced to the Northeast Semifinal competition at Boston Symphony Hall on March 4, 2018 but did not advance to finals.

Returning to competition the next year, The Bottom Line was named Northeast Quarterfinal Champions on March 9, 2019, at the University of Hartford. Janna Blackstone and Nina Grogan won an award for Outstanding Choreography for their visual work on the set and for the second year in a row, Maxwell Pudvar received the Outstanding Vocal Percussion award. On March 31, 2019, The Bottom Line returned to Boston Symphony Hall for the Northeast Semifinal competition where they received fourth place in the region, and choreographers Janna Blackstone and Nina Grogan once again earned the top award for their work.

When the COVID-19 pandemic began, the 2020 ICCA was put on hold for the group; the event was started up again in 2021 as a virtual music video competition. The Bottom Line shot a music video, with student videographer Matt Hird, to "She Ain't Me", originally performed by Sinead Harnett and arranged by Tyler Nordin. This marked the group's first music video. The audio was recorded and mixed by student and Music Director Tyler Hahn. The Bottom Line's video placed third at the Northeast Quarterfinals on March 13, 2021.

In 2023, The Bottom Line returned to the ICCA to compete live for the first time in four years. On March 4, 2023, the Bottom Line traveled to St. Joseph's University in New York to compete in the Northeast Quarterfinals, where the group placed second, qualifying them for Semifinals. Tristan Beale earned an award for Outstanding Choreography at the Northeast Quarterfinal and their set was arranged by Tyler Nordin. On March 25, 2023, the Bottom Line traveled to Berklee College of Music to compete at the Northeast Semifinals, however the group did not advance to Finals.

The Bottom Line competed again in the 2024 ICCA and took the stage at University of Hartford on Saturday, February 3, 2024 at the first Northeast Quarterfinal of the year.

== Recordings ==
After earning local notoriety for their set selection at the International Championship of Collegiate A Cappella, The Bottom Line recorded their single, "Comeback", originally performed by Ella Eyre and arranged by Elliott von Wendt. The single was produced by The Vocal Company and released in the Fall of 2019.

The Bottom Line also released "She Ain't Me" as a single on all streaming platforms on April 23, 2021.

During their ICCA hiatus, the group recorded their first album with Cut Off Studios in March 2022. The album, titled Legacy consisted of the remaining songs that were not recorded from the 2019 ICCA set and three new songs chosen by the group. Legacy also included a re-release of Comeback to round out the seven song project. The first four songs on the album were arranged by Elliot Von Wendt in 2018 and the latter arranged by Spencer Camacho in 2021. The album was released on all streaming platforms on April 28, 2023.

In April 2023, The Bottom Line recorded their 2023 ICCA set on site at Bryant University with recording engineer Nina Pelligra. The EP project was titled Resilience and was released on January 26, 2024.

== Notable Discography ==
The Bottom Line has performed custom arrangements of the following songs that have shaped the group's style in recent years:

=== ICCA 2018 ===
Performed at Boston Symphony Hall for 2018 ICCA Northeast Semifinals.

If I Go- opb Ella Eyre

Talk Me Down- opb Troye Sivan

Not Afraid Anymore- opb Halsey

=== She Ain't Me ===
Released on all streaming platforms April 23, 2021.

She Ain't Me- opb Sinead Harnett

=== Legacy ===
Released on all streaming platforms April 28, 2023 (Comeback originally released November 20, 2019). Comeback, Liar, Everybody Wants to Rule the World, and Palo Santo were all originally performed by The Bottom Line during the 2019 ICCA season.

Comeback- opb Ella Eyre

Liar- opb Léon

Everybody Wants to Rule the World- opb Tears for Fears (in the style of Lorde)

Palo Santo- opb Years & Years

Good Things Come to Those Who Wait- opb Nathan Sykes

Thinkin' Bout You- opb Jordan Hart

Edge of Midnight- opb Miley Cyrus (ft. Stevie Nicks)

=== ICCA 2023 ===
Released on all streaming platforms on January 6, 2024.

Herald- opb Odette

Bad Dreams- opb Faouzia

Liberation- opb BUZZ

Sooner or Later- opb Years & Years
