= Richard Lyne =

English painter and engraver (fl. 1570–1600)

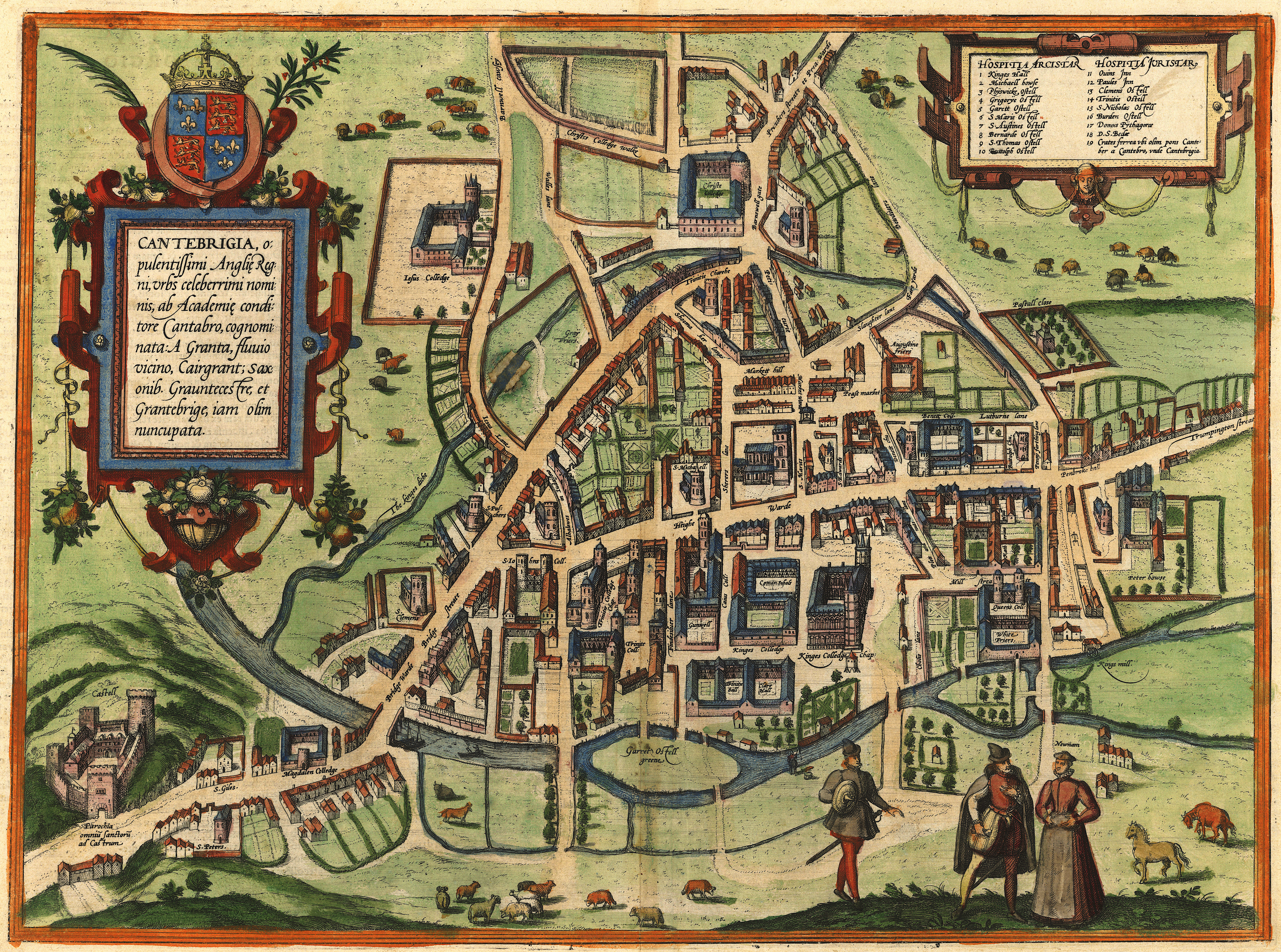
Map of Cambridge (1575)

Richard Lyne (fl. 1570–1600) was an English painter and engraver.

Lyne was one of the earliest native artists in England whose works have been preserved. He was one of the engravers employed by Matthew Parker, Archbishop of Canterbury, and worked for him, in company with Remigius Hogenberg, at Cambridge and at Lambeth Palace. It is probable that the interesting portrait of Parker at Lambeth, of which a small engraving in copper was made by Hogenberg, was painted by Lyne. Lyne drew and engraved at Parker's expense a very interesting map of the University of Cambridge, for John Caius's History of the University, published in 1574. He also engraved in the same year a large genealogical chart of the history of Great Britain (partly engraved by Hogenberg), which appeared in Alexander Neville's De Furoribus Norfolciensium Ketto Duce in 1575. Lyne is mentioned by Francis Meres in his Palladis Tamia (1598) as among the leading painters of the time.

== Bibliography ==
- Cust, Lionel Henry (1893). "Lyne, Richard" . In Lee, Sidney (ed.). Dictionary of National Biography. Vol. 34. London: Smith, Elder & Co. p. 342.
