= The Bottom Line (Australian TV series) =

'The Bottom Line' was a television chat show broadcast in Australia on Channel Nine. The show was a joint venture initiative between CPA Australia and Evolution Media Group. it consisted of interview-based leadership discussion, hosted by CPA Chief Executive Alex Malley, aimed at producing an understanding of the lives of prominent leaders around the world. Guests included Australian and international leaders, such as Sir Michael Parkinson, Bryce Courtenay, Lord Jeffrey Archer, Ricky Ponting, Gabi Hollows, and Curtis Stone.

== History ==
In 2008, the Evolution Media Group and CPA Australia worked in collaboration to create The Bottom Line as a platform to bring together leaders from around the globe and tell their stories. The Bottom Line website was launched to provide a broadcast channel for The Bottom Line web series and also provide an opportunity for viewers to see past episodes as well as behind the scenes interviews, galleries, and debates on education and leadership issues.

== Web series ==
With a small pilot production budget, five episodes were initially produced for The Bottom Line website, featuring John Borghetti, Catriona Noble, Glenn A. Baker, Ann Sherry, and Jack Matthews.

== Television series ==
=== Season 1 ===
Season 1 saw the transition from web-based content to a television series. The series was broadcast on Channel Nine in 2013 (12 February – 7 April) and consisted of eight episodes, with feature interviews from Ita Buttrose, Dick Smith, Bryce Courtenay, David Gonski, Don Argus, Christine Nixon, Mark Tedeschi, and The Hon Michael Kirby.

=== Season 2 ===
Season two of The Bottom Line aired in 2013 (22 June – 31 August) on Channel Nine and consisted of 11 episodes with feature interviews from Terri Irwin, Moira Kelly, Peter Cosgrove, Richard Goyder, Malcolm Turnbull, Lindy Camberlain-Creighton, James Morrison, Greg Rudd, Lindsay Fox, Peter Garrett, and Cathy Freeman. It was for this series that The Bottom Line won the Gold Award for Best Integration and Brand Story Telling at the Asia Pacific Festival of Branded Content and Entertainment (BE). The 2013 season was also re-broadcast on Gem at 7:30pm on Thursdays.

=== Season 3 ===
Season three of The Bottom Line aired on Channel Nine from 15 February 2014. The series ran for 24 weeks and included talent such as Ricky Ponting, Matthew Reilly, Curtis Stone, Gabi Hollows, Lord Jeffrey Archer, Warren Mundine, Mickey Arthur, and Sir Michael Parkinson.

== See also ==
- In Conversation with Alex Malley
