= Lines (poem) =

1837 English poem by Emily Brontë

"Lines" is a poem written by English writer Emily Brontë (1818–1848) in December 1837. It is understood that the poem was written in the Haworth parsonage, two years after Brontë had left Roe Head, where she was unable to settle as a pupil. At that time, she had already lived through the death of her mother and two of her sisters. As the daughter of a parson, Brontë received a rigorously religious education, which is evident in much of her work. "Lines" is representative of much of her poetry, which broke Victorian gender stereotypes by adopting the Gothic tradition and genre of Romanticism, allowing her to express and examine her emotions.

Throughout their lives, the Brontë children struggled with leaving their own home in Haworth to which they felt so closely attached. The gender prejudice of the nineteenth century left little choice for young women like Brontë who were seeking employment, occupation or education. It was widely accepted that females would hold self-effacing roles as housewives, mothers, governesses or seamstresses. Any poetry written by females was expected to address issues of religion, motherhood and wifehood on an instructive and educative level.

The Brontës subverted these stereotypes, choosing to write on topics such as death and love. The family lived in a parsonage opposite the church graveyard and was plagued with poor health and loss of life; inevitably death appears frequently in the writings of each.

== The poem ==
The poem is structured in four stanzas of four lines each:

I die, but when the grave shall press
The heart so long endeared to thee,
When earthly cares no more distress
And earthly joys are nought to me,

Weep not, but think that I have passed
Before thee o'er a sea of gloom,
Have anchored safe, and rest at last
Where tears and mourning cannot come.

'Tis I should weep to leave thee here
On the dark ocean sailing drear,
With storms around and fears before,
And no kind light to point the shore.

But long or short though life may be,
'Tis nothing to eternity:
We part below to meet on high,
Where blissful ages never die.

== Criticism ==
The poem begins prominently with "I die", immediately setting the tone for the poem which describes Brontë's feelings concerning death. Brontë gives the impression of indifference to death. Death will free her from "earthly cares" and "distress". It is possible to interpret this attitude as death as relief from the suffering she has endured while mourning the losses in her family. As a teenager, it seems strange for Brontë to be writing of her own death; however the presence of death in her life would have been inescapable. Using metaphor, she describes a "sea of gloom" over which she passes to be "anchored". This appears to be her interpretation of life as uncertain and relentless. She sees security in death which will allow her to "rest" and remain "safe" from the torment of "tears" and "mourning". It is by now clear, at the end of the second stanza, that death itself is a desirable escape from the repercussions it brings into life.

Brontë continues with the metaphor of life as the "Ocean", using adjectives such as "dark" and "drear" to describe it negatively. It becomes apparent that death is a safe haven for Brontë. Death is represented by the "shore", where the troubles of "storms" and "fears" cannot reach. The final stanza is more positive and adopts a different perspective on life and death. Displaying her religious beliefs, she pitches the insignificant length of time against the afterlife which will last for "eternity". Life is "nothing to eternity", especially when the afterlife can unite Brontë with her lost family members. She seeks to prove the greatness of such a place where "ages never die". With enjambment and without punctuation, Brontë creates the effect that life is transient, death is close and that the pains and "fears" of living will not be endured for long.
