= Helpline Telecoms Nigeria Limited =

- Industry: Telecommunications
- Founded: 2003
- Headquarters: Nigeria
- Key people: Opoola S. Olayiwola (Founder/ CEO)
- Services: Closed User Group; Electronic Voucher Distribution; Consultancy
- Website: www.helplinetelecoms.net

Helpline Telecoms Nigeria Limited was incorporated as a private limited liability Company in 2003.

Helpline Telecoms was registered to provide service in Nigeria's telecoms downstream sector that has an active telephone lines of about 85 Million as at October, 2010. The Company is made up of two units, Helpline e-Services and Helpline Family.

Helpline e-Services is a POS based Electronic Voucher Distribution (EVD) platform designed for the use of Retail Outlets – Hotels, Supermarkets, Pharmacies, Mini-marts, Eateries, Bookshops etc.

The need to reduce the cost of printing and distributing recharge cards in Nigeria forced many telecoms operators to consider an alternative medium of distributing their air-time electronically. This need and also in keeping with the trends in developed countries of North America and Western Europe the company decided to invest in the development of Electronic Voucher Distribution (EVD) platform by using Helpline e-Box, equipped with GPRS technology to vend telephone air-time. This service called Helpline e-Services is a service targeting the pre-paid telephone billing system users that constitute more than 90% of the total phone subscriber base in Nigeria. The participating vendors includes hotels, supermarkets, cybercafes and eateries across the nation.

The service started at inception on the platform of Visafone but later expanded to include Nigerian's second national carrier and GSM operator Globacom and CDMA network Starcomms Plc. A steady growth has been witnessed in the 3 years of operations and subscriber base currently stand at 7,000.

Helpline has picked up several awards from Telecommunications service providers (operators) in Nigeria over the past four years.

== Branch Network ==
Due to the shifting focus of the company from a mortal and brick based sales company, the company's physical location is the headquarters in Ibadan and the Lagos contact office at Cubic Technologies, 19 Mojidi Street, Off Toyin Street, Ikeja, Lagos. The Head office is at Plot 9, Ibadan City Council, Opposite The Nigerian Stock Exchange, Molete/ Challenge Road, Challenge, Ibadan, Nigeria.

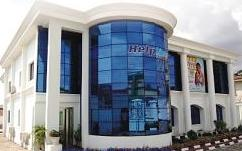
Helpline Telecoms Headquarters
