= Bottom Line (album) =

Studio album by John Mayall
- Released: 1979
- Recorded: 1979
- Genre: Blues, jazz-rock
- Length: 46:21
- Label: DJM
- Producer: Bob Johnston

John Mayall chronology
The Last of British Blues (1978)	Bottom Line (1979)	No More Interviews (1980)

Bottom Line is an album by the English musician John Mayall, released in 1979. It was produced by Bob Johnston. It is the only Mayall album that has never been released on CD.

== Critical reception ==
Professional ratings
Review scores
Source	Rating
AllMusic	2/5 stars
The Encyclopedia of Popular Music	2/5 stars
The Rolling Stone Album Guide	2/5 stars
The Tampa Tribune	D

The Tampa Tribune wrote that "it's mostly middle-of-the-road soul vocals with a jazzy background, and Mayall just can't carry it."

== Track listing ==
Side one

1. "Bottom Line" (*1)
2. "Dreamboat" (*2)
3. "Desert Flower" (*1)
4. "I'm Gonna Do It" (*1)

Side two

1. "Revival" (*2)
2. "The Game of Love" (*2)
3. "Celebration" (*3)
4. "Come with Me" (*3)

== Personnel ==
- (1): John Mayall-vocals, harmonica. Leon Pendarvis-keyboards. Bob Babbitt-bass. Francisco Centeno-bass. Jeffrey Miranov-guitar. Sid McGinnis-guitar. John Tropea-guitar. Steve Jordan-drums. Errol "Crusher" Bennett-percussion. Arthur Jenkins-percussion. Rob Mounsey-keyboards. Jon Faddis-trumpet. Virgil Jones-trumpet. George Young-alto saxophone, "C" flute. Allan Ralph-bass trombone. Howard Johnson-baritone saxophone, Vivian Cherry, Ullanda McCullough, Janice Gadson Pendarvis- backing vocals.
- (2): John Mayall-vocals, harmonica. Gordon Edwards-bass. Cornell Dupree-guitar. Jeff Layton-guitar. Paul Shaffer-keyboards. Rubens Bassini-percussion. Michael Brecker-tenor saxophone. Ron Cuber-baritone saxophone. Randy Brecker-trumpet. Lew Soloff-trumpet. Vivian Cherry, Ullanda McCullough, Janice Gadson Pendarvis- backing vocals.
- (3): John Mayall-vocals, harmonica. Bernie Krause-Moog. David Shields-bass. Tim Drummond-bass. Lee Ritenour-guitar. Ben Benay-guitar. Steve Lukather-guitar. Jeff Porcaro-drums. John Jarvis-piano. Alejandro Neciosup-percussion. Steve Forman-percussion. Lee Holdridge-strings. Cheryl Lynn, Delbert Langston, Pepper Watkins-backing vocals.

Transcribed from an original album cover. 1979 Dick James Music. DJM Records DJM-23 Liner Notes
