= Line Vennesland =

Norwegian politician

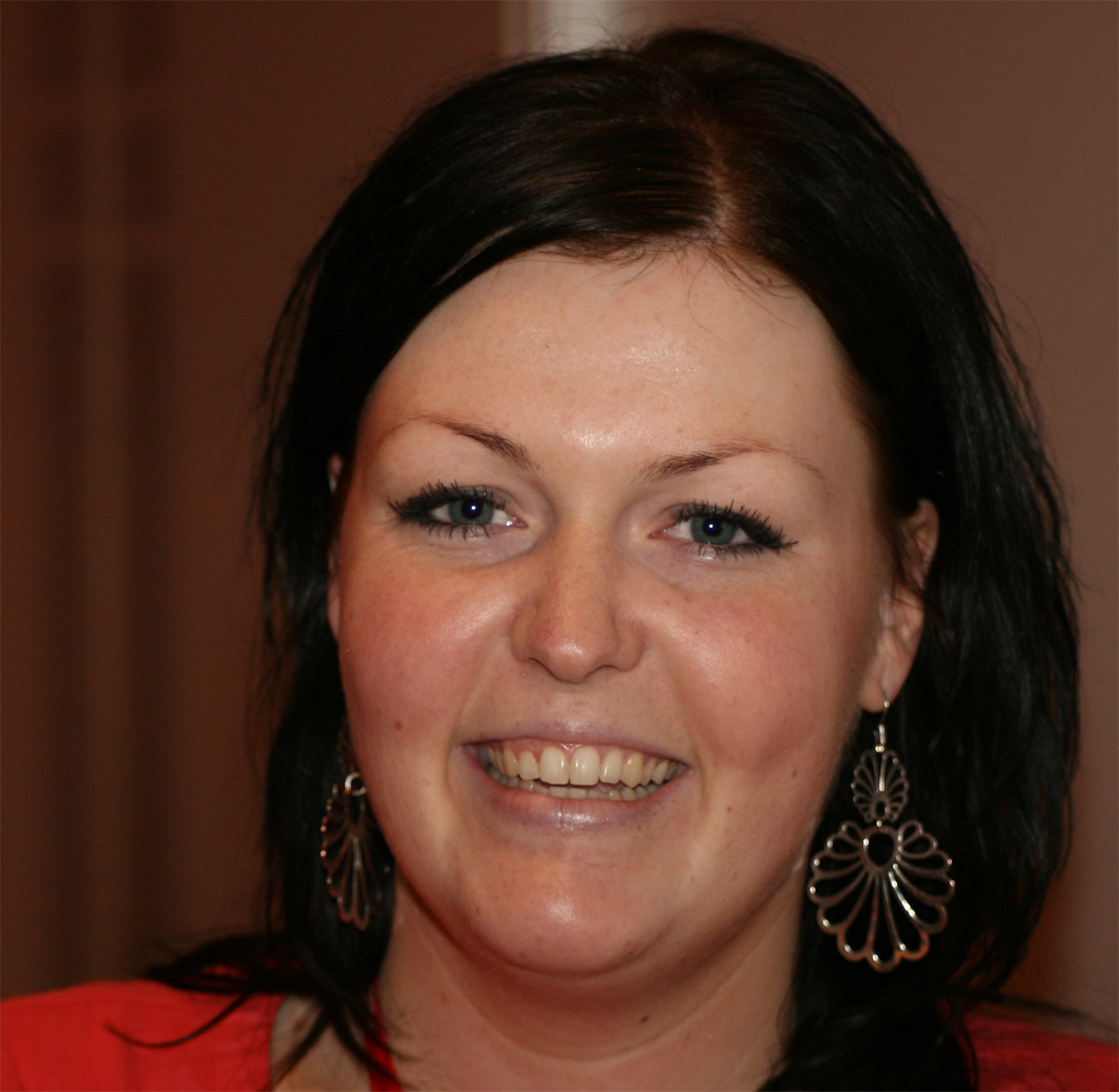
Line Vennesland.

Line Vennesland (born 6 February 1985) is a Norwegian politician for the Labour Party.

She served as a deputy representative to the Parliament of Norway from Aust-Agder during the terms 2009–2013 and 2013–2017.

She has been a member of the municipal council of Evje og Hornnes Municipality and the Aust-Agder county council.
