= Samuel Rostill Lines =

English painter (1804–1833)

- Born: 15 January 1804; Birmingham, England
- Died: 9 November 1833 (aged 29)
- Resting place: St. Philip's Cathedral
- Known for: Painting, illustration
- Style: Watercolour

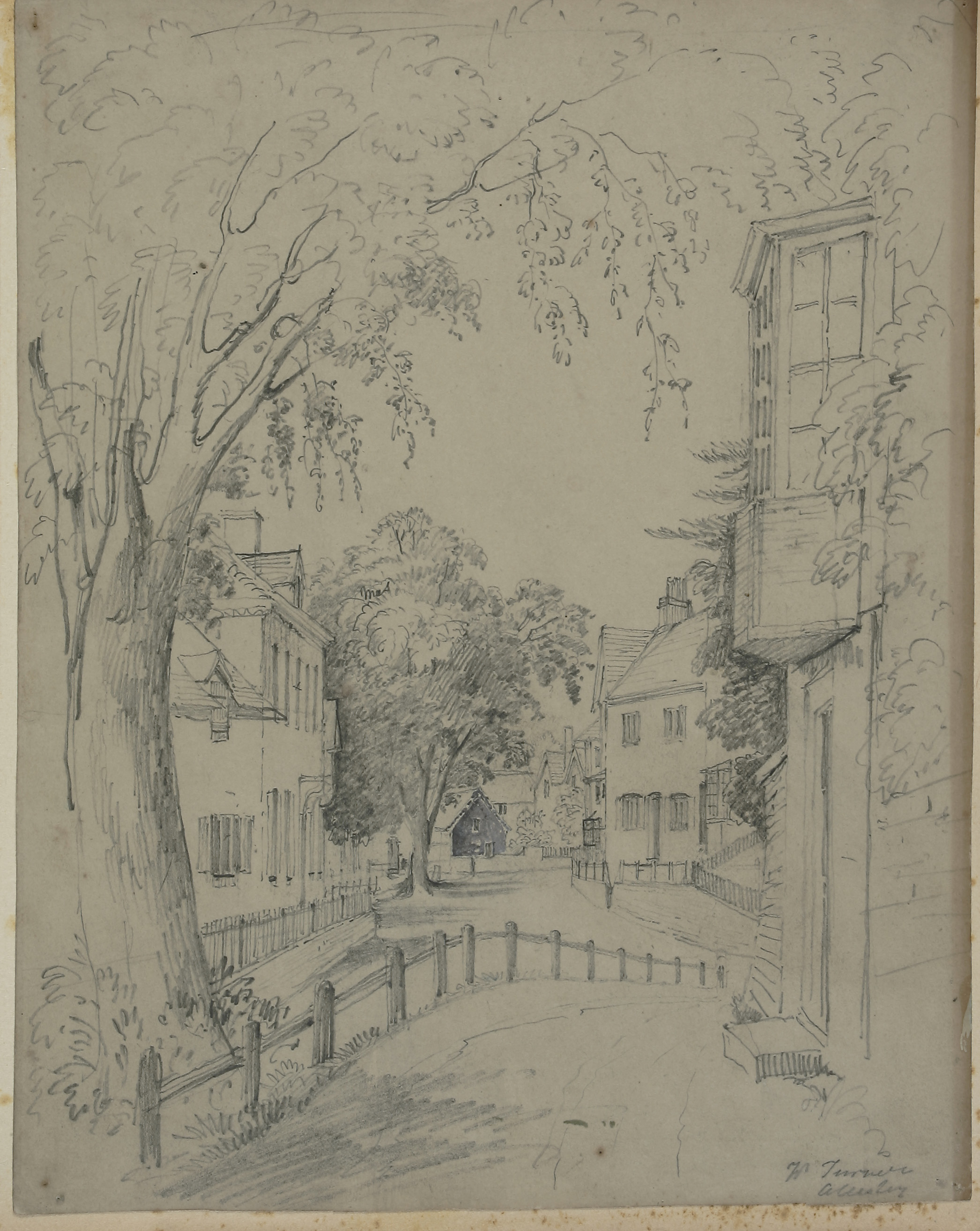
Allesley, Warwickshire, 1828/9, by Lines

Samuel Rostill Lines (15 January 1804 – 9 November 1833; sometimes listed as Samuel Restell Lines) was an English painter and illustrator.

Born in Birmingham, he was the third son of Samuel Lines, one of the founders of the academy for the training of artists that would eventually evolve into the Royal Birmingham Society of Artists and Birmingham School of Art. The younger Lines studied drawing and painting under his father and showed great promise in illustrating landscapes and buildings – having work exhibited at the Royal Academy – but died in Birmingham at the age of only twenty nine.

His brothers Frederick Thomas Lines and Henry Harris Lines were also artists.

He is buried in his father's grave at St. Philip's Cathedral in Birmingham.

Examples of his work feature in the collections of the Royal Birmingham Society of Artists, Victoria and Albert Museum, Birmingham Museum and Art Gallery and Maidstone Museum & Art Gallery.
