= Frederick Thomas Lines =

English portrait painter (1808–1898)

Frederick Thomas Lines (26 July 1808 – 10 April 1898) was an English portrait painter in addition to experimenting in studies from nature and landscape. Lines was known to be a master of the medium of watercolour.

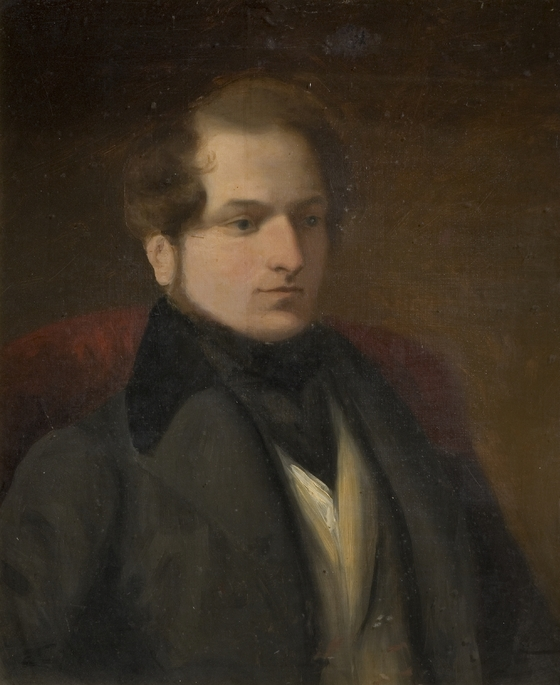
Lines' portrait of his father Samuel (1778–1863); in the collection of Birmingham Museums Trust.

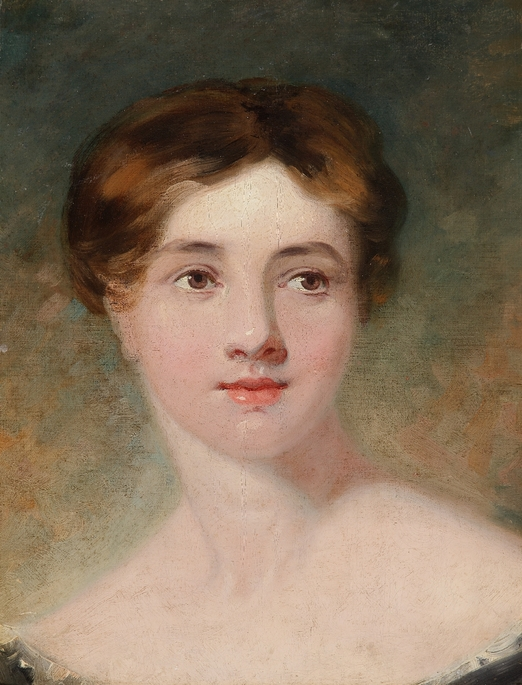
Portrait of a Woman; in the collection of Worcester City Museums, England.

Lines was the youngest son of Samuel Lines (1778–1863) and so a brother to Samuel Rostill Lines and Henry Harris Lines. He was born in 1808 but not baptised till age 30.

He was tutored in drawing by his father. Lines travelled to London to train as a portraitist with artist Richard Evans (1784–1871), who was employed as an assistant to work in the studio of Sir Thomas Lawrence (1769–1830).

Lines taught drawing at Edwin Hill's Bruce Castle School in Tottenham and later returned to Birmingham to assist his father in his academy of arts.

Lines frequently exhibited at the Royal Society of Arts, in addition to the Royal Academy in London and the Birmingham Society of Arts (now known as the Royal Birmingham Society of Artists ), joining in 1837.

He was married to Sarah Breedon Butler, and they had two children, Frances Elizabeth and Frederick Joseph Butler Lines, the latter of whom also showed artistic talent like his father. The family lived in Handsworth, then in Staffordshire.
