= Henry Harris Lines =

British painter (1800/01–1889)

- Born: 1800 or 1801
- Died: 20 February 1889 (aged c. 89); Worcester, England
- Occupation: Artist
- Children: 3 daughters
- Parent: Samuel Lines
- Relatives: William Rostill Lines (1802–1846); Samuel Rostill Lines (1803–1833); Edward Ashcroft Lines (1807–1875); Frederick Thomas Lines (1808–1898)

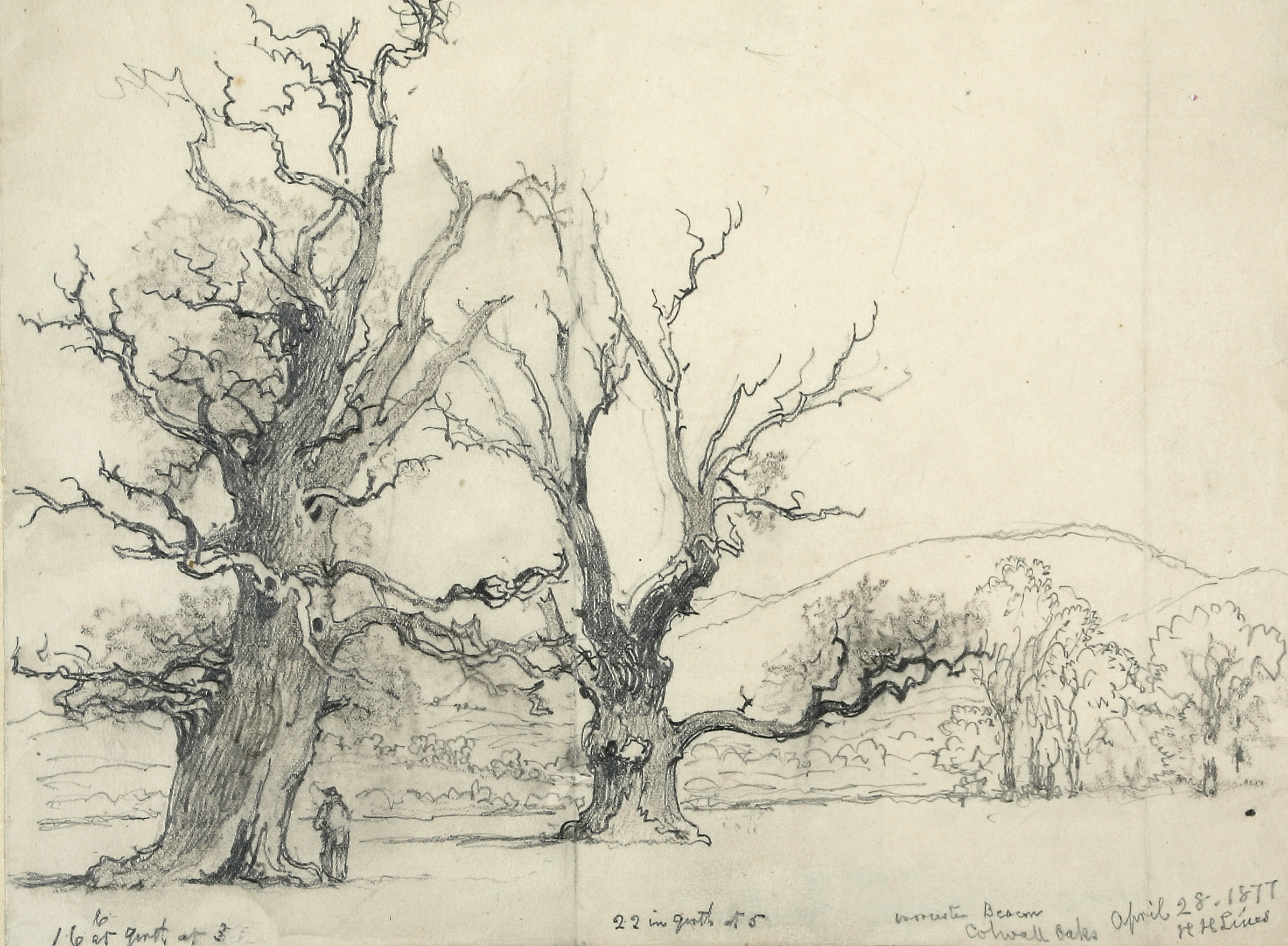
Drawing of Colwall Oaks

Henry Harris Lines (1800 or 1801 - 20 February 1889) was a landscape artist and archaeologist, and the eldest son of Birmingham artist and drawing master Samuel Lines (1778–1863). There are a number of Henry's works stored in the permanent collections of various provincial museums and art galleries including Birmingham Museum and Art Gallery, Worcester City Art Gallery and Museum and the Royal Birmingham Society of Artists (RBSA) Gallery. As well as at the Birmingham Society of Arts (the precursor to the RBSA), Henry also exhibited at the Royal Academy, British Institution and Society of British Artists. The Wright family's patronage of the Lines family is also evident in William Rostill Lines's (Henry's younger brother) sculpture Bust of Mr. Thomas Wright Hill that was exhibited at the Birmingham Society of Arts Exhibition in 1829.

== Early life ==
He had four younger siblings: William Rostill Lines (1802–1846), Samuel Rostill Lines (1803–1833), Edward Ashcroft Lines (1807–1875) and Frederick Thomas Lines (1808–1898). The extent of Henry's early artistic education is uncertain, but it is highly likely that he was taught to draw by his father. Henry Harris also attended Thomas Wright Hill's Hilltop School, which was located in central Birmingham, a short distance from the family's home on Temple Row West.

== Career ==
Henry exhibited at the Royal Academy for the first time in 1818 (Caesar's Tower, Kenilworth Castle). Between 1818 and 1846, he exhibited eighteen works at the Royal Academy in total, exceeding in number those of Samuel (senior) and Frederick Thomas Lines (Henry's youngest brother) combined. All works were landscapes, spanning the Midlands to Cornwall and Yorkshire. He was also acquainted with celebrated landscapists such as the Birmingham artist David Cox. It is suggested in Cox's letters that they had visited Yorkshire together. Henry exhibited at the Birmingham Society of Arts in their first Exhibition of Modern Works in 1827. He joined their Committee of Artists in 1828, and became a full Member of the Society in 1830. He remained a Member until approximately 1856, and was listed as an annual subscriber from 1858 onwards, alongside his younger brothers, Frederick Thomas and Edward Ashcroft. He had sixteen works accepted in the first exhibition – all landscapes and topographical views of Yorkshire, North Wales and the Midlands. He later travelled to Switzerland in approximately 1846, returning to exhibit in Birmingham a series of Swiss-inspired landscapes.

=== Worcester ===
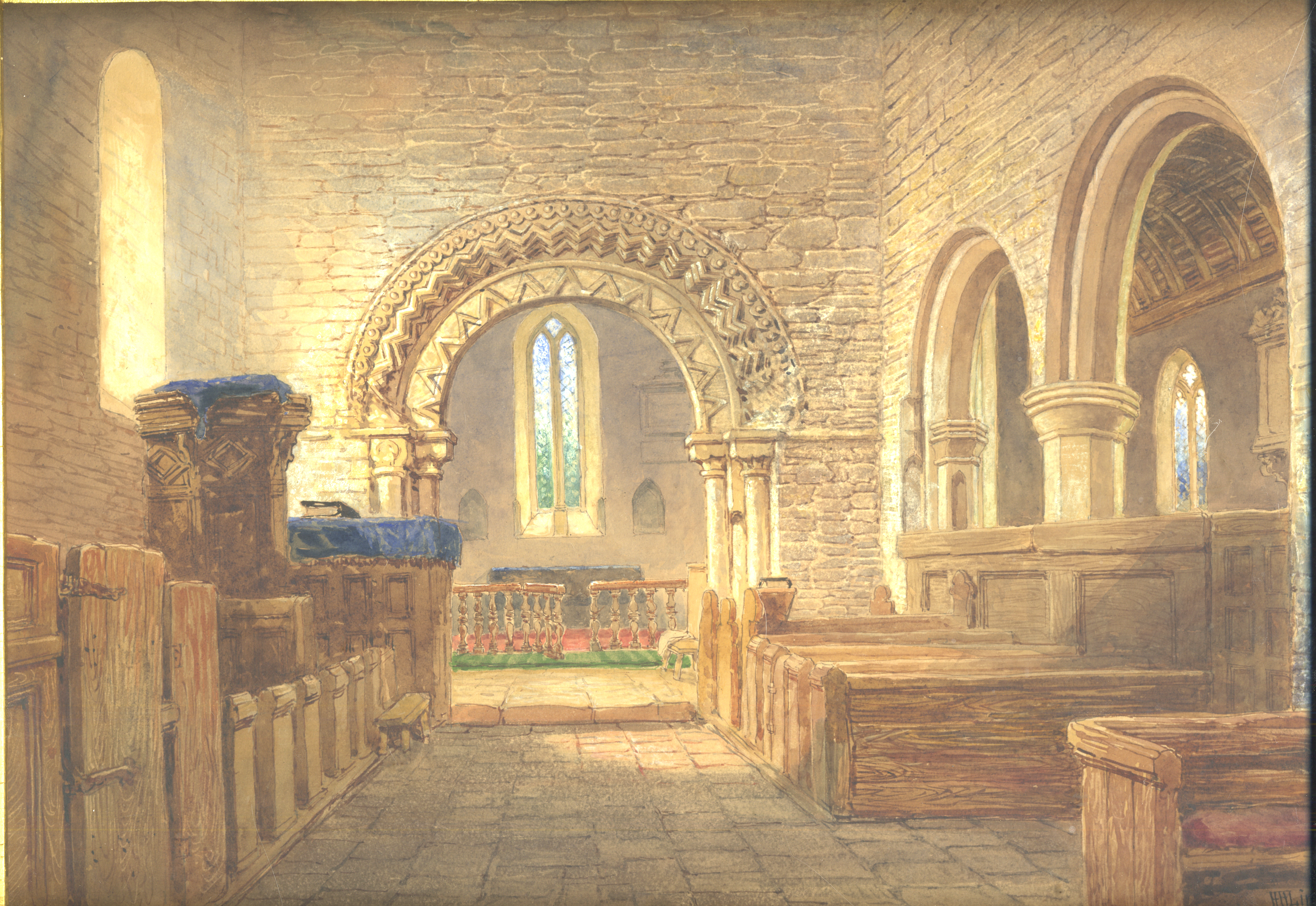
St Martin's Church, Holt Fleet, near Worcester, in 1879, by lines

Henry Harris moved to Worcester in 1832 because of the cholera epidemic that was spreading across the Midlands. He lived at Bath Road but also retained his address in Birmingham until 1838. From that year onwards, his addresses remained in the Worcester area. Worcester was previously seen as lacking in intellectual activity, as highlighted by Henry Harris' school friend Edwin Lees who originally trained as a printer and stationer but later turned to the sciences and natural history. Geoffrey Potter notes in Henry's biography that Lees, upon visiting Worcester in 1828, noticed 'Worcester's lack of the societies and institutions necessary for a man of refined intellect', which 'was remedied by a Mr. Jackson, who delivered a course of lectures on the subject of Natural Philosophy'. From this emerged the Worcester Literary and Scientific Society, which became the exemplar for other societies within the region, such as the Worcestershire Natural Society and the Worcester Archaeological Club. Henry Harris thrived in this hub of activity and it was here that his work as both archaeologist and artist excelled.

== Personal life ==
Henry Harris married Emma Lacey and had three daughters.

== Archaeology ==
In Worcester, Henry Harris was also embarked upon a new career as an amateur archaeologist and antiquarian. He spent much of his later years surveying his local Malvern Hills, meticulously taking measurements and visually recording the ancient and physical features. An example of this work is held in Herefordshire Archives and Record Centre: "Plan of the British Camp, Herefordshire Beacon. 1879.", a large ink and wash drawing [CO34 - yet to be published online]. Besides his surveys of the Malvern Hills, he was also known to travel alone to North Wales every summer to explore the ancient stone monuments. This was a practice that he continued throughout his seventies, relenting only in his early eighties because of his failing eyesight. His antiquarian interests are also seen in his architectural studies of church interiors.

== Death ==
Henry Harris died in Worcester on 20 February 1889, having suffered a 'paralytic stroke' in December 1887.
