= Line (given name) =

Line is a female given name, most common in Denmark, Norway, and France. It may be a short form of names which end in -line, like Caroline.

Variants include Ine, in Norway, and Aline, Lina, and Lyna, in France.

== People ==
Notable people with the name Line include:

- Line Arlien-Søborg (born 1966), Danish actress and film director
- Line Barfod (born 1964), member of the Folketing (Danish parliament)
- Line Beauchamp (born 1963), Canadian politician
- Line Daugaard (born 1978), Danish handball player
- Line Haddad (born 1978), Jewish French pair skater
- Line Hagman, Norwegian orienteering competitor
- Line Halvorsen (born 1969), Norwegian film maker
- Line Hamel, Canadian politician
- Line Hansen, (born 1983), Danish professional squash player
- Line Henriette Holten Hjemdal (born 1971), Norwegian politician
- Line Horntveth (born 1974), Norwegian musician
- Line Jahr (born 1984), Norwegian ski jumper
- Line Jensen (disambiguation), multiple people, including:
  - Line Jensen (triathlete) (born 1981), Danish triathlete
  - Line Jensen (footballer) (born 1991), Danish footballer
- Line Johansen, Norwegian sport wrestler
- Line Jørgensen (born 1989), Danish handball player
- Line Kruse (disambiguation), several people, including:
  - Line Damkjær Kruse (born 1988), Danish basketball player
  - Line Kruse (actress) (born 1975), Danish actress
- Line Larsen (born 1996), Danish singer
- Line Luplau (1823-1891), Danish feminist and suffragist
- Line Maheux, Canadian communications consultant and political strategist
- Line Monty (died 2003), Jewish Algerian singer
- Line Noro (1900–1985), French stage and film actress
- Line Østvold (1978–2004), Norwegian professional snowboarder
- Line Renaud (born 1928), French singer, actress and AIDS activist
- Line Røddik Hansen (born 1988), Danish football defender
- Line Sørensen (born 1982), Danish pop singer
- Line Van Wambeke (also known as Lyne Renée) (born 1979), Belgian actress
- Line Vennesland (born 1985), Norwegian politician
- Line Verndal (born 1972), Norwegian actress

== See also ==
- Line (surname)
- Linet (given name)
