= English name =

Personal names used in, or originating in, England

English names are personal names used in, or originating in, England. In England, as elsewhere in the English-speaking world, a complete name usually consists of one or more given names, commonly referred to as first names, and a (most commonly patrilineal, rarely matrilineal) family name or surname, also referred to as a last name. The given names after the first are often referred to as middle names.

An example of an English signature (that of Oliver Cromwell) with first and last name

== Given names ==
Few given names used in England have English derivations. Many names are of Hebrew (Daniel, David, Elizabeth, Susan) or Greek (Nicholas, Dorothy, George, and Helen) origin. Some are Germanic names, sometimes adopted via the transmission of French (Robert, Richard, Gertrude, Charlotte) or originate from Indo-European (Adrian, Amelia, Patrick) or Celtic.

A small fraction of given names has an actual English derivation (see Anglo-Saxon names), such as Alfred, Edgar, Edmund, Edward, Edwin, Harold and Oswald. A distinctive feature of Anglophone names is the surnames of important families used as given names, originally to indicate political support or patronage. Many examples have now become normal names chosen because parents like them, and any political sense lost. Most are male names like Cecil, Gerald, Howard, Percy, Montague, Stanley or Gordon, though some have female versions like Cecilia or Geraldine. Other languages have few equivalents, although the saint's surname Xavier is often used by Roman Catholics.

During the majority of the 19th century, the most popular given names were Mary for girls and either John or William for boys. Throughout the Early Modern period, the diversity of given names was comparatively small; the three most popular male given names represented nearly 50% of the male population throughout this period. For example, of the boys born in London in the year 1510, 24.4% were named John, 13.3% were named Thomas and 11.7% were named William. A trend towards more diversity in given names began in the mid-19th century, and by 1900, only 22.9% of the newborn boys, and 16.2% of the newborn girls in the UK shared the top three given names for each gender. The trend continued during the 20th century, and by 1994, these figures had fallen to 11% and 8.6%, respectively. This trend is a result of a combination of greater individualism in the choice of names, and the increasing ethnic heterogeneity of the UK population, which led to a wider range of frequent given names from non-European traditions. Oliver and Olivia were the most popular baby names in England and Wales in 2018.

=== Forms of given names ===
Forms of common male English given names
English	French	German	Greek	Italian	Portuguese	Spanish
Aaron	Aaron	Aaron	Aarón	Aronne	Aarão	Aarón
Abel	Abel	Abel	Ável	Abele	Abel	Abel
Abner	Abner	Abner	Avenír	Abner	Abner	Abner
Abraham	Abraham	Abraham	Avraám	Abramo	Abraão	Abraham
Absalom	Absalom	Abschalom	Avessalóm	Assalonne	Absalão	Absalón
Adam	Adam	Adam	Adám	Adamo	Adão	Adán
Adolph	Adolphe	Adolf	-	Adolfo	-	Adolfo
Adrian	Adrien	Adrian	Adríanos	Adriano	Adriano	Adrián
Alan	Alain	-	-	-	-	-
Albert	Albert	Albert	-	Alberto	Alberto	Alberto
Alexander	Alexandre	Alexander	Aléxandros	Alessandro	Alexandre	Alejandro
Alexis	Alexis	-	Aléxis	Alessio	Aleixo	Alejo
Alfred	Alfred	Alfred	-	Alfredo	Alfredo	Alfredo
Alphonse	Alphonse	Alfons	-	Alfonso	Afonso	Alfonso
Alvin	-	Alwin	-	-	-	-
Amadeus	Amédée	Amadeus	-	Amedeo	Amadeu	Amadeo
Ambrose	Ambroise	Ambrosius	-	Ambrogio	Ambrósio	Ambrosio
Anastasius	Anastase	-	Anastásios	Anastasio	Anastácio	Anastásio
Andrew	André	Andreas	Andréas	Andrea	André	Andrés
Angel	Ange	Engel	Ángelos	Angelo	Anjo	Ángel
Anthony	Antoine	Anton	Antónios	Antonio	Antônio	Antonio
Archangel	Archange	Erzengel	Archángelos	Arcangelo	Arcanjo	Arcángel
Archibald	Archambault	Archibald	-	Arcibaldo	Arquibaldo	Archibaldo
Arnold	Arnaud	Arnold	-	Arnoldo	Arnaldo	Arnoldo
Arnulf	Arnoul	Arnolf	-	Arnolfo	Arnulfo	Arnulfo
Arthur	Arthur	Arthur	-	Arturo	Artur	Arturo
Asher	Aser	Ascher	-	Aser	Aser	Aser
Augustine	Augustin	Augustin	Avgoustínos	Agostino	Agostinho	Agustín
Bartholomew	Barthélémy	Bartholomäus	Vartholomaíos	Bartolomeo	Bartolomeu	Bartolomé
Basil	Basile	Basilius	Vasíleios	Basilio	Basílio	Basilio
Benedict	Benoît	Benedikt	-	Benedetto	Benedito	Benedicto
Benjamin	Benjamin	Benjamin	-	Beniamino	Benjamim	Benjamín
Bernard	Bernard	Bernhard	-	Bernardo	Bernardo	Bernardo
Caleb	Caleb	Kaleb	-	Caleb	Calebe	Caleb
Celestine	Célestin	-	-	Celestino	Celestino	Celestino
Charles/Carl	Charles	Karl	Károlos	Carlo	Carlos	Carlos
Christian	Christian	Christian	Christianós	Cristiano	Cristiano	Cristián
Christopher	Christophe	Christoph	Christóforos	Cristoforo	Cristóvão	Cristóbal
Claude	Claude	-	-	Claudio	Cláudio	Claudio
Conrad	-	Conrad	-	Corrado	Conrado	Conrado
Constantine	Constantin	Konstantin	Konstantínos	Costantino	Constantino	Constantino
Cornelius	Corneille	Cornelius	Kornílios	Cornelio	Cornélio	Cornelio
Cyril	Cyrille	Kyrill	Kýrillos	Cirillo	Cirilo	Cirilo
Damian	Damien	Damian	Damianós	Damiano	Damião	Damián
Daniel	Daniel	Daniel	Daniíl	Daniele	Daniel	Daniel
Darius	-	Dareios	-	Dario	Dário	Darío
David	David	David	Davíd	Davide	David	David
Demetrius	Dimitri	Demetrius	Dimítrios	Demetrio	Demétrio	Demetrio
Dennis	Denis	Dennis	Dionýsios	Dionisio	Dionísio	Dionisio
Derek	Thierry	Dietrich	-	Teodorico	Teodorico	Teodorico
Dominic	Dominique	Dominik	-	Domenico	Domingos	Domingo
Edmund	Edmond	Edmund	-	Edmundo	Edmundo	Edmundo
Edgar	Edgar	Edgar	-	Edgardo	Edgar	Edgar
Edward	Édouard	Eduard	Edouárdos	Edoardo	Eduardo	Eduardo
Edwin	-	Otwin	-	-	-	-
Eli	-	Eli	Ilías	Eli	Eli	Eli
Elijah	Élie	Elias	Ilías	Elia	Elías	Elías
Elmer	-	Elmar	-	-	-	-
Emmanuel	Emmanuel	Emanuel	Emmanouíl	Emanuele	Manuel	Manuel
Emil	Émile	Emil	Aimílios	Emilio	Emilio	Emilio
Emory	Émeric	Emmerich	-	Amerigo	-	-
Enoch	Hénoch	-	-	Enoch	-	Enoc
Ephraim	Éphraïm	Ephraim	Efraím	Efraim	Efraim	Efraín
Eric	Éric	Erich	Erríkos	Erico	Érico	Erico
Ernest	Ernest	Ernst	Ernéstos	Ernesto	Ernesto	Ernesto
Eugene	Eugène	Eugen	Evgénios	Eugenio	Eugênio	Eugenio
Eustace	Eustache	Eustachius	Efstáchyos	Eustachio	Eustácio	Eustaquio
Evans	Evangelos	-	Evángelos	Evangelo	-	-
Ezekiel	Ézéchiel	Ezechiel	-	Ezechiele	Ezequiel	Ezequiel
Ezra	Esdras	Esra	Ésdra	Esdras	Esdras	
Felix	Félix	Felix	Felice	Félix	Félix	
Francis	François	Franz	Frangískos	Francesco	Francisco	Francisco
Frederick	Frédéric	Friedrich	Frideríkos	Federico	Frederico	Federico
Gabriel	Gabriel	Gabriel	Gavriíl	Gabriele	Gabriel	Gabriel
Gavin	Gauvain	Gabinus	-	Gavino	Galvão	Gavino
Geoffrey	Geoffrey	Gottfried	-	Goffredo	Godofredo	Godofredo
George	Georges	Georg	Geórgios	Giorgio	Jorge	Jorge
Gerald	Gérald	Gerald	-	Giraldo	Geraldo	Geraldo
Gerard	Gérard	Gerhard	Gerardo	Gerardo	Gerardo	
Giles	Gilles	Ägidius	-	Egídio	Gil	
Gregory	Grégoire	Gregor	Grigórios	Gregorio	Gregório	Gregorio
Guy	Guy	Guido	-	Guido	Guido	Guido
Harold	-	Harald	-	Aroldo	Haroldo	Haroldo
Harvey	Hervé	-	Charívios	-	-	-
Hector	Hector	-	Éktor	Ettore	Heitor	Héctor
Henry	Henri	Heinrich	Enríkos	Enrico	Henrique	Enrique
Herbert	Herbert	Heribert	-	Erberto	Herberto	Herberto
Herman	Armand	Hermann	Armándos	Armando	Armando	Armando
Hezekiah	Ézéchias	Ezechias	-	Ezechia	Ezequias	Ezequías
Hiram	Hiram	Hiram	-	Hiram	Hirão	Hiram
Homer	Homère	-	Ómiros	Omero	Homero	-
Honorius	Honoré	Honorius	Onórios	Onorio	Honório	Honorio
Horace	Horace	Horaz	Orátios	Orazio	Horácio	Horacio
Hubert	Hubert	Hubert	-	Uberto	Huberto	Huberto
Hugh	Hugues	Hugo	-	Ugo	Hugo	Hugo
Isaac	Isaac	Isaak	Isaák	Isacco	Isaac	Isaac
Isaiah	Isaïe	Isaias	Isaías	Isaia	Isaías	Isaías
Isidore	Isidore	Isidor	Isídoros	Isidoro	Isidoro	Isidoro
Israel	Israël	Israel	-	Israele	Israel	Israel
Jacob	Jacob	Jakob	Iákovos	Giacobbe	Jacó	Jacobo
James	Jacques	Jakob	Iákovos	Giacomo	Jaime	Jaime
Jared	Yared	Jered	-	Iared	Jarede	Jared
Jason	Jason	Jason	Iásonas	Giasone	Jasão	Jasón
Jeremiah	Jérémie	Jeremias	Ieremías	Geremia	Jeremias	Jeremías
Jerome	Jérôme	Hieronymus	Ierónymos	Gerolamo	Jerônimo	Jerónimo
Jesse	Jessé	Isai	Iessaías	Iesse	Jessé	Jesé
Jesus	Jésus	Jesus	Iisoús	Gesù	Jesus	Jesús
Job	Job	Hiob	Ióv	Giobbe	Jó	Job
John	Jean	Johann	Ioánnis	Giovanni	João	Juan
Jonah	Jonas	Jona	Ionás	Giona	Jonas	Jonás
Jonathan	Jonathan	Jonathan	Ionáthan	Gionata	Jónatas	Jonatan
Joseph	Joseph	Josef	Iosíf	Giuseppe	José	José
Joshua	Josué	Josua	Iisoús	Giosuè	Josué	Josué
Josiah	Josias	Josia	-	Giosia	Josias	Josías
Judah	Juda	Juda	-	Giuda	Judá	Judá
Julian	Julien	Julian	Ioulianós	Giuliano	Juliano	Julián
Julius	Jules	Julius	Ioúlios	Giulio	Júlio	Julio
Lawrence	Laurent	Lorenz	Lorétzos	Lorenzo	Lourenço	Lorenzo
Lazarus	Lazare	Lazarus	Lázaros	Lazzaro	Lázaro	Lázaro
Leon	Léon	Leo	Léon	Leone	Leão	León
Leonard	Léonard	Leonhard	Leonárdos	Leonardo	Leonardo	Leonardo
Leopold	Léopold	Leopold	Leopóldos	Leopoldo	Leopoldo	Leopoldo
Lothair	Lothaire	Lothar	-	Lotario	Lotário	Lotario
Louis	Louis	Ludwig	Loízos	Luigi	Luís	Luis
Luke	Luc	Lukas	Loukás	Luca	Lucas	Lucas
Marcellus	Marcel	Marcel	Márkellos	Marcello	Marcelo	Marcelo
Mark	Marc	Markus	Márkos	Marco	Marcos	Marcos
Martin	Martin	Martin	-	Martino	Martim	Martín
Matthew	Matthieu	Matthias	-	Matteo	Mateus	Mateo
Maurice	Maurice	Moritz	-	Maurizio	Maurício	Mauricio
Maximilian	Maximilien	Maximilian	-	Massimiliano	Maximiliano	Maximiliano
Maximus	Maxime	-	-	Massimo	Máximo	Máximo
Micah	Michée	Micha	-	Michea	Miqueias	Miqueas
Michael	Michel	Michael	-	Michele	Miguel	Miguel
Moses	Moïse	Mose	-	Mosè	Moisés	Moisés
Nathan	Nathan	Natan	Náthan	Natan	Natã	Natán
Nathanael	Nathanaël	Nathanael	Nathanaíl	Natanaele	Natanael	Natanael
Nicholas	Nicolas	Nikolaus	Nikólaos	Nicola	Nicolau	Nicolás
Noah	Noé	Noach	Nóe	Noè	Noé	Noé
Octavius	Octave	-	Oktávios	Ottavio	Octávio	Octavio
Oliver	Olivier	Oliver	-	Oliviero	Olivério	Oliverio
Orestes	Oreste	Orestes	Oréstis	Oreste	Orestes	Orestes
Orpheus	Orphée	Orpheus	Orféas	Orfeo	Orfeu	Orfeo
Oscar	Oscar	Oskar	-	-	Óscar	Óscar
Oswald	-	Oswald	-	Osvaldo	Osvaldo	Osvaldo
Otto	Eudes	Odo	Eúdis	Oddone	Eudo	Eudes
Patrick	Patrice	Patrick	-	Patrizio	Patrício	Patricio
Paul	Paul	Paul	Paúlos	Paolo	Paulo	Pablo
Perfectus	Parfait	-	-	-	-	Perfecto
Peter	Pierre	Peter	Pétros	Pietro	Pedro	Pedro
Phaethon	Phaéton	Phaethon	Faéthon	Fetonte	Faetonte	Faetón
Philip	Philippe	Philipp	Fílippos	Filippo	Filipe	Felipe
Phinehas	Phinées	Pinchas	-	Fineas	Fineias	Fineas
Plutarch	Plutarque	Plutarch	Ploútarchos	Plutarco	Plutarco	Plutarco
Prosper	Prosper	-	-	Prospero	-	Próspero
Quentin	Quentin	-	-	Quintino	Quintino	Quintín
Randolf	-	-	-	-	-	-
Ralph	Raoul	Ralph	-	Raul	Raul	Raúl
Raphael	Raphaël	Raphael	Rafaíl	Raffaele	Rafael	Rafael
Raymond	Raymond	Raimund	-	Raimondo	Raimundo	Raimundo
Reuben	Ruben	Ruben	Ruben	Rubem	Rubén	
Richard	Richard	Richard	Riccardo	Ricardo	Ricardo	
Robert	Robert	Robert	Roberto	Roberto	Roberto	
Roderick	Rodrigue	Roderich	Rodrigo	Rodrigo	Rodrigo	
Roger	Roger	Rutger	Ruggero	Rogério	Rogelio	
Roland	Roland	Roland	Rolando	Rolando	Rolando	
Rudolph	Rodolphe	Rudolf	Rodolfo	Rodolfo	Rodolfo	
Rupert	Rupert	Ruprecht	Ruperto	Ruperto	Ruperto	
Samson	Samson	Simson	Sansone	Sansão	Sansón	
Samuel	Samuel	Samuel	Samouíl	Samuele	Samuel	Samuel
Saul	Saül	Saul	Saul	Saulo	Saúl	
Sebastian	Sébastien	Sebastian	Sebastiano	Sebastião	Sebastián	
Seth	Seth	Set	Set	Sete	Set	
Sigmund	Sigismond	Sigismund	Sigismondo	-	-	
Simeon	Siméon	Simeon	Simeone	Simeão	Simeón	
Simon	Simon	Simon	Símon	Simone	Simão	Simón
Solomon	Salomon	Salomo	Salomone	Salomão	Salomón	
Spyrus	Spyridon	-	Spiridione	-	Spiridión	
Stanislaus	Stanislas	Stanislaus	Stanislao	Estanislau	Estanislao	
Stephen	Étienne	Stephan	Stéfanos	Stefano	Estêvão	Esteban
Theodore	Théodore	Theodor	Theódoros	Teodoro	Teodoro	Teodoro
Thomas	Thomas	Thomas	Tommaso	Tomás	Tomás	
Timothy	Timothée	Timotheus	Timótheos	Timoteo	Timoteo	Timoteo
Tobias	Tobie	Tobias	Tovías	Tobia	Tobias	Tobías
Ulrich	Ulrich	Ulrich	Ulrico	Ulrico	Udalrico	
Ulysses	Ulysse	Odysseus	Ulisse	Ulisses	Ulises	
Valentine	Valentin	Valentin	Valentino	Valentim	Valentin	
Vangel	-	-	Vangélis	-	-	-
Victor	Victor	Viktor	Vittorio	Vítor	Víctor	
Vincent	Vincent	Vinzenz	-	Vincenzo	Vicente	Vicente
Walter	Gauthier	Walter	-	Gualtiero	Guálter	Gutierre
William	Guillaume	Wilhelm	Gouliélmos	Guglielmo	Guilherme	Guillermo
Xavier	Xavier	-	-	Saverio	Xavier	Javier
Zachary	Zacharie	Zacharias	Zacharías	Zaccaria	Zacarias	Zacarías

Forms of common female English given names
English	French	German	Greek	Hungarian	Italian	Portuguese	Spanish
Alexandra	Alexandra	Alexandra	Alexándra	Alexandra	Alessandra	Alexandra	Alejandra
Alexia	-	Alexia	Alexía	-	Alessia	Alexia	Αlejia
Alice	Alice	Alice	Alíki	Alice	Alice	Alice	Alicia
Amy	Aimée	-	Amánta	Amánta	Amata	Amada	Amada
Agnes	Agnès	Agnes	Agní	Ágnes	Agnese	Inês	Inés
Anastasia	Anastasie	-	Anastasía	-	Anastasia	Anastácia	Anastásia
Angela	Angèle	Angela	Ángela	Angéla	Ángela	Ângela	Ángela
Angelica	Angélique	Angelika	Angelikí	Angyalka	Angelica	Angélica	Angélica
Annabel	Annabelle	-	-	-	-	Anabela	Anabel
Antonia	-	-	Antonía	-	Antonella	Antônia	-
Aurelia / Orelia	Aurélie / Orélie	Aurelia	Oraiozíli / Oraília	-	Aurelia / Orella	Aurélia / Orélia	Aurelia / Orelia
Barbara	Barbe	Barbara	Varvára	Borbála	Barbara	Bárbara	Bárbara
Basel	-	Basel	Vasileía	Bázel	Basilea	Basilia	Basilia
Catherine	Catherine	Katarina	Ekateríni	Katalin	Caterina	Catarina	Catalina
Charlotte	Charlotte	Charlotte	-	Sarolta	Carlotta	Carlota	Carlota
Christine	Christine	Christina	Christína	Krisztina	Cristina	Cristina	Cristina
Cleopatra	Cléopâtre	-	Kleopátra	-	Cleopatra	Cleópatra	Cleopatra
Daphne	Daphné	-	Dáfni	-	Dafne	-	Dafne
Danae	Danaé	-	Danái	-	Danae	-	Danae
Daniella	Danielle	Daniela	Daniéla	-	Daniela	Daniela	Daniela
Dorothy	Dorothée	Dorothea	Dorothéa	Dorottya	Dorotea	Doroteia	Dorotea
Eleanor	Éléonore	Eleonora	Eleonóra	Eleonóra	Eleonora	Leonor	Leonor
Elizabeth	Élisabeth	Elisabeth	Elisávet	Erzsébet	Elisabetta	Elisabete/Isabel	Elisabet/Isabella
Eugenia	Eugénie	-	Eugenía	-	Eugenia	Eugêniα	Eugenia
Emmanuelle	Emmanuelle	-	Emmanouilía	-	Emanuela	Manoela	Manuela
Emerald	Émeraude	-	Smaragda	-	Esmeralda	Esmeralda	Esmeralda
Evangelie	Évangéline	Evangelina	Evangelía	-	Evangelina	Evangelista	Evangelina
Eve	Ève	Eva	Eva	Éva	Eva	Eva	Eva
Felicity	Félicité	Felicitas	-	Felicitás	Felicita	Felicidade	Felicidad
Frances	Françoise	Franziska	Frangiska	Franciska	Francesca	Francisca	Francisca
Frederica	Frédérique	Friederica	Frideríki	-	Federica	Frederica	Federica
Gabriella	Gabrielle	Gabriela	Gavriéla	-	Gabriela	Gabriela	Gabriela
Helena	Hélèna	Helena	Élena	-	Elena	Helena	Elena
Hannah	Anne	Hannah	Anna	Anna	Anna	Ana	Ana
Helen	Hélène	Helena	Eléni	Ilona	Elena	Helena	Elena
Joan	Jeanne	Johanna	Ioánna	-	Giovanna	Joana	Juana
Josepha	Josèphe	Josepha	-	Jozefa	Giuseppa	Josefa	Josefa
Josephine	Joséphine	Josephine	Iosifína	Jozefina	Giuseppina	Josefina	Josefina
Louise	Louise	Louisa	Louíza	Lujza	Luisa	Luísa	Luisa
Lucy	Lucie	Lucia	Loukía	Luca	Lucia	Lúcia	Lucía
Magdalene	Madeleine	Magdalena	Magdaliní	Magdaléna	Maddalena	Madalena	Magdalena
Marcella	Marcelle	Marcella	Markélla	-	Marcella	Marcela	Marcela
Margaret	Marguerite	Margareta	Margaríta	Margaréta	Margherita	Margarida	Margarita
Marina	Marine	Marina	Marína	-	Marina	Marina	Marina
Martha	Marthe	Marthe	Mártha	Márta	Marta	Marta	Marta
Mary	Marie	Maria	María	Mária	Maria	Maria	María
Nicola	Nicole	Nicole	Nikol	-	-	-	Nicolasa
Paula	Paule	Paula	Polína	Paula	Paοla	Paula	Paula
Paulina	Pauline	Paulina	Pavlína	Paulina	Paolina	Paulina	Paulina
Penelope	Pénélope	Penelope	Pinelópi	Pénelopé	Penelope	Penélope	Penélope
Queen	Reine	-	Vasílissa	-	Regina	Rainha	Reina
Raphaela	Raphaëlle	Raffaela	Rafailía	-	Raffaella	Rafaela	Rafaela
Rebecca	Rébecca	Rebekka	Revékka	-	Rebecca	Rebeca	Rebeca
Sandy	Dimanche	-	Kyriakí	-	Domenica	Dominga	Dominga
Simone	Simone	Simone	Simóni	-	Simona	Simone	-
Sophia	Sophie	Sophia	Sofía	Zsófia	Sofia	Sofia	Sofía
Susanna	Suzanne	Susanne	Sousánna	Zsuzsanna	Susanna	Susana	Susana
Sylvia	Sylvie	Sylvia	Sýlvia	Szilvia	Silvia	Sílvia	Silvia
Theresa	Thérèse	Theresa	-	Terézia	Teresa	Teresa	Teresa
Valerie	Valérie	Valerie	Valéria	Valéria	Valeria	Valéria	Valéria
Vicky	Basilique	Basilika	Vasilikí	Bazilika	Basilica	Basílica	Basílica
Victoria	Victoire	Viktoria	Viktoría	Victoria	Vittoria	Vitória	Victoria
Violet	Violette	-	Violétta	-	Violetta	Violeta	Violeta
Wendy	-	-	-	-	-	-	-

== Surnames ==
According to Christopher Daniell, in 1140 marked what might be the first recorded use of a modern surname, inherited by multiple generations. These were not always regularly formed: for example, the sons of a certain French named Robert used a modern inheritable surname, FitzGerald, in honour of an earlier relative, named Gerald.

While it is normal for a child to be given one of their parents' surnames, traditionally the father's (or increasingly some combination of the two), there is nothing in UK law that explicitly requires this. Under English common law, a person may use any name as a legal name, though most people use their birth name (as registered on the Register of Births, Marriages and Deaths, regulated by the Registration of Births and Deaths Regulations 1987, which allows only characters that are used in English or Welsh), often using a spouse's surname (proved with a marriage certificate), or (if an adult) a name formally declared by deed poll. No regulations include any specific provisions regarding what names are acceptable. Nonetheless, the General Register Office and various organizations that help with creating and enrolling deed polls will reject anything that is unreasonable (racist, offensive, fraudulent, implying a title of nobility not held, unpronounceable, not in the Latin script, etc.).

=== Compound surnames ===
Double-barrelled names may be formed for a variety of reasons, including combining of spouses' surnames upon marriage or, more commonly in the past, adding another family's surname as a condition of inheritance.

Compound surnames in English feature two or more words, often joined by a hyphen or hyphens: for example, Henry Hepburne-Scott. A few families have three or four words making up their surname, such as Charles Hepburn-Stuart-Forbes-Trefusis, 21st Baron Clinton and Alexander Charles Robert Vane-Tempest-Stewart, 9th Marquess of Londonderry. However, it is not unusual for compound surnames to be composed of separate words not linked by a hyphen, for example Iain Duncan Smith, a former leader of the Conservative Party, whose surname is "Duncan Smith".

== See also ==
- List of the most common surnames in Europe
