= Philip Hunt (priest) =

English Anglican priest and antiquarian (1772–1838)

Philip Hunt (1772–1838) was an English Anglican priest and antiquarian. Chaplain to Lord Elgin, he is now remembered as a figure in the history of the Elgin Marbles. Hunt applied bribery to acquire antiquities for export to Elgin's collection through agents. He also excavated at the Parthenon.

== Early life ==
He was the son of Thomas Hunt of Newcastle-on-Tyne where he was brought up, was born in Herefordshire, and was educated at Newcastle Grammar School under Hugh Moises. He matriculated at Trinity College, Cambridge in 1788 at age 16, becoming a scholar in 1791; he graduated B.A. in 1793, and M.A.in 1799.

Hunt was ordained deacon in 1794, by George Pretyman-Tomline, and became curate of Houghton Conquest in Bedfordshire. After graduating, Hunt had John FitzPatrick, 2nd Earl of Upper Ossory as ecclesiastical patron. He was ordained priest in 1796, and was vicar of St Peter's Church, Bedford from 1799, a position he held to 1835.

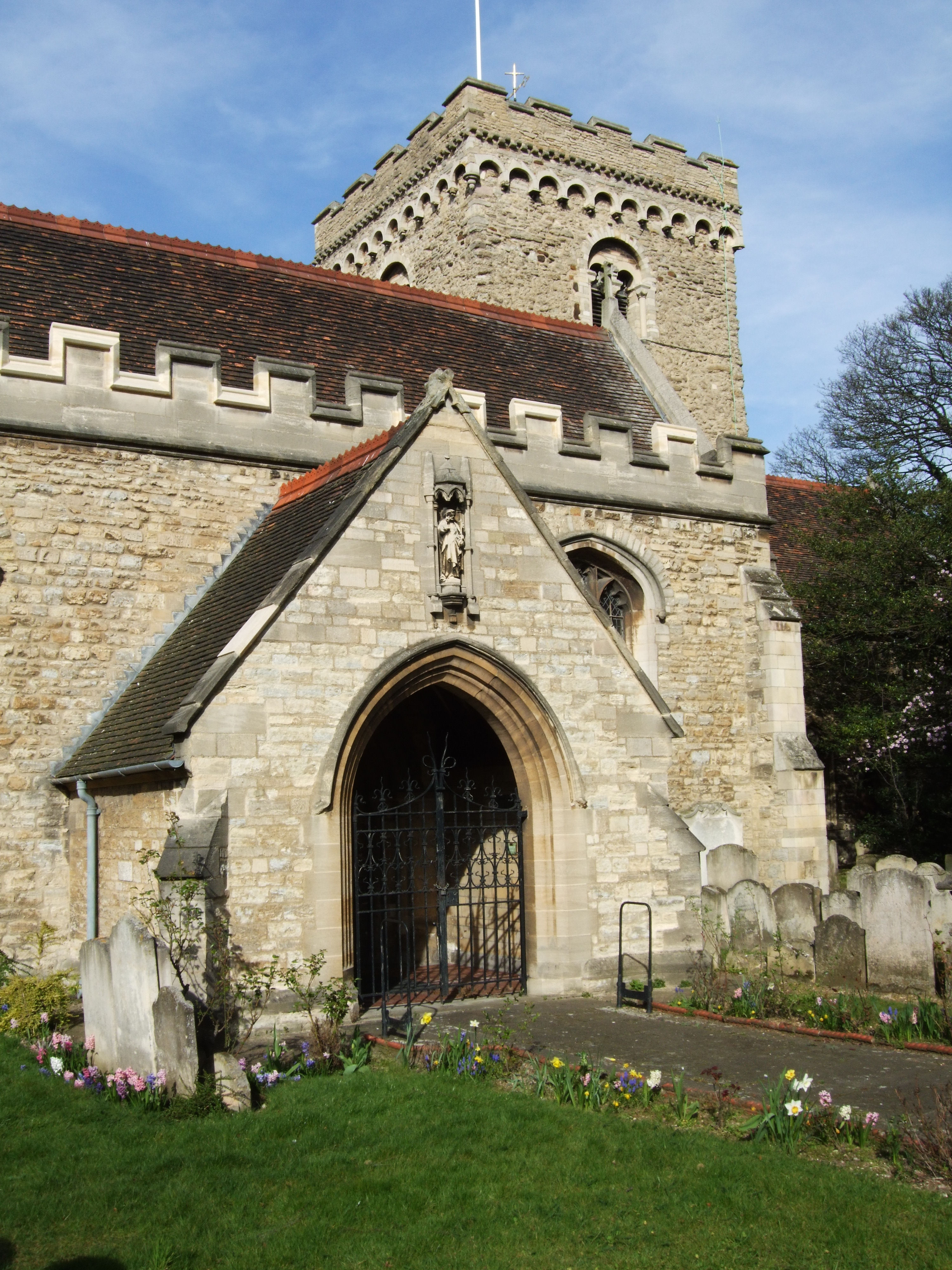
The South Porch, St Peter's Church in Bedford

== Chaplain to Lord Elgin ==
Through a friend, John Brand who was rector of Maulden, Hunt became chaplain to Lord Elgin, who was Ambassador of Great Britain to the Ottoman Empire from 1799 to 1802. He joined Elgin's party sailing to Constantinople on HMS Phaeton. Elgin gave Hunt and William Richard Hamilton, his private secretary, the task of collecting antiquities. Hunt visited the Troad with Elgin in 1799. Joseph Dacre Carlyle, also on Elgin's staff, had been asked to search for manuscripts, particularly those related to the New Testament, and Hunt assisted him in a thorough investigation of monasteries in the Constantinople area and on the Prince Islands.

In March 1801 Hunt set off on an Aegean voyage with Carlyle, looking further afield. A second visit to the Troad saw Hunt remove an inscription; Carlyle and Hunt also fell in with Edward Daniel Clarke there, but a scholarly disagreement over the site of Troy turned into something of a vendetta on Clarke's part. They also visited Mount Athos. In May, Elgin obtained a firman to the Athens authorities, on Hunt's advice; Giovanni Battista Lusieri who was employed by Elgin reached Athens in April, Carlyle and Hunt in May; Hunt was put in charge of Lusieri, and Elgin's workmen.

There was, however, a division of authority in Athens, with the vaivode having civilian control, while the Disdar, a military man, was in charge of the Acropolis, then a fort of the Turkish forces. To resolve the position, Hunt then applied for a second firman on 1 July. The precise import of this second firman is crucial for the subsequent debate on the formal position of the Elgin marbles. As described in the memoirs of William Gell, Hunt returned with it on 22 July, a success connected by William St Clair with the participation of British forces under John Hely Hutchinson in the Ottoman campaign to remove the French from Egypt. With its enlarged scope, Hunt applied bribery, to acquire antiquities for export to Elgin's collection through agents. He also excavated at the Parthenon. One significant factor in favour of Hunt's renewed approach was the death of the Disdar, whose son was anxious to succeed to his position, and fabricated a story about previous damage to a metope. The original permissions in Athens had been to create a visual record, and Edward Dodwell at least took advantage.

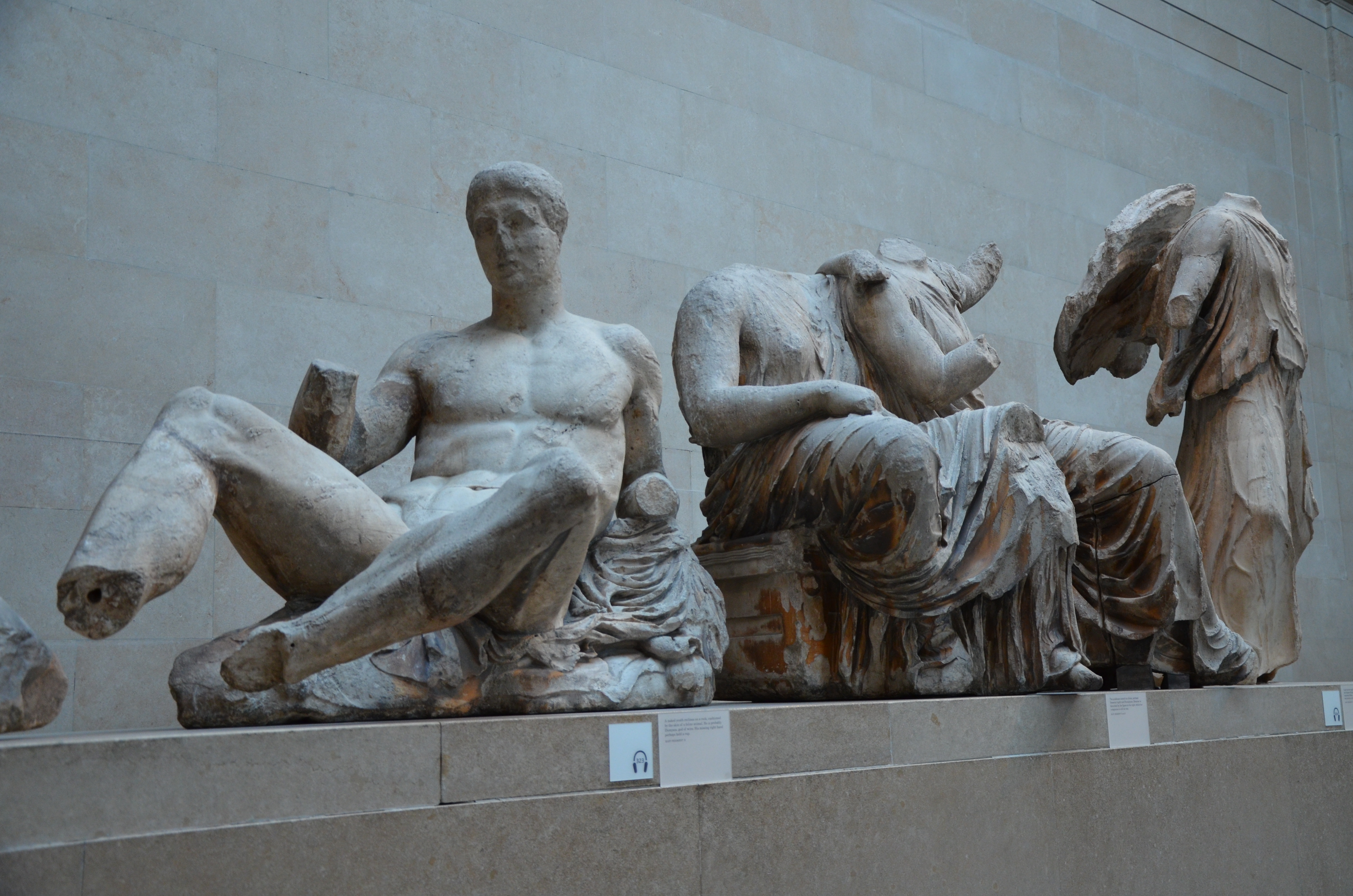
Parthenon sculptures, British Museum

Hunt was simultaneously on an intelligence mission to the Morea, and he visited Ali Pasha. St Clair comments that the diplomatic situation, with the British wishing to discourage local powers in Greece from involvement with the French, was the actual reason Hunt returned to Athens in July; and that he would not have been the first choice from Elgin's staff. Hamilton and John Philip Morier were neither then available. In his absence, work proceeded in Athens on the Marbles, led briefly by Thomas Lacy of the Royal Engineers, and then by Lusieri. Elgin came in person to Athens in April 1802, very pleased, and provided more resources for the work begun by Hunt and Lusieri. Both Hunt and Lusieri had been working on the assumption that the marbles were destined for restoration in Italy: but William Richard Hamilton argued against that, on security grounds.

In November 1801 Hunt returned to Athens for diplomatic reasons on HMS La Victorieuse, to keep one step ahead of Sébastiani, French agent in Constantinople. He also intervened from there in early 1803 in salvage operations for the Mentor, which had sunk with some of the Marbles. At the same period of the Peace of Amiens in early 1803, Elgin set off to return to the United Kingdom. He was detained in France, however. Hunt too was arrested, at Montmélian, making his own was back from Malta via Venice, and held with him at Barèges; and was able to leave only in September 1805.

== Later life ==
As Elgin dealt with the financial consequences of his mission and collecting, it became clear to Hunt that he was not to be rewarded for his work (on which he entered with the expectation of a salary to be paid in arrears); and he broke with Elgin, taking John Russell, 6th Duke of Bedford as a new patron. He went with the Duke to Ireland, as his secretary, not long after returning to the United Kingdom. In politics he became a noted supporter of the Russell family, local Whig grandees in Bedfordshire. He held the Bedfordshire livings of Ravensden (1810–1817), Willington (1810–1834), and Goldington (1817–1828) (all these being presentations by the Duke of Bedford). Hunt was called a pluralist in the press in 1833, as an attack on the Whig administration.

Hunt testified to the Parliamentary committee on the Elgin Marbles on 13 March 1816. The committee's report contained a translation (via Italian) of the second firman. The Italian original is extant. Hunt's testimony was that the interpretation by the vaivode of the second firman was the basis for the removals of marbles. Among other testimony was that of John Morritt, who in the 1790s had succeeded in bribing the Disdar to allow him to remove marbles, but had been dissuaded from acting, by Louis-François-Sébastien Fauvel.

In 1817 Hunt was involved in the return of manuscripts to the Patriarch of Constantinople, from among those Carlyle had collected, some of which were loans. Carlyle had died in 1804, and his sister as executor had contacted Hunt (then held in France) about manuscripts in the estate. Hunt at the time suggested depositing them in the Lambeth Palace library, where they stayed until diplomatic and public pressure on Hunt and Elgin made a resolution of claims expedient.

Hunt worked as librarian to the Duke of Bedford, with successor in 1821 Jeremiah Wiffen. While at Woburn he translated from Italian work of Ugo Foscolo, concerning Antonio Canova.

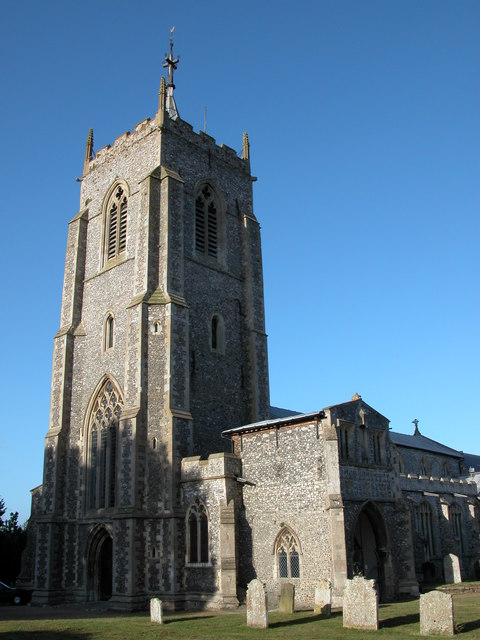
St Michael's Church, Aylsham, Norfolk

In 1828 Hunt became rector of Bedford St John, with the mastership of St John's Hospital, Bedford, which he held to 1835. He was also a trustee of the Bedford Charity.

In 1833 Hunt was made canon of the tenth prebend at Canterbury Cathedral in 1833, He was presented to Aylsham in 1834. and died on 17 September 1838.

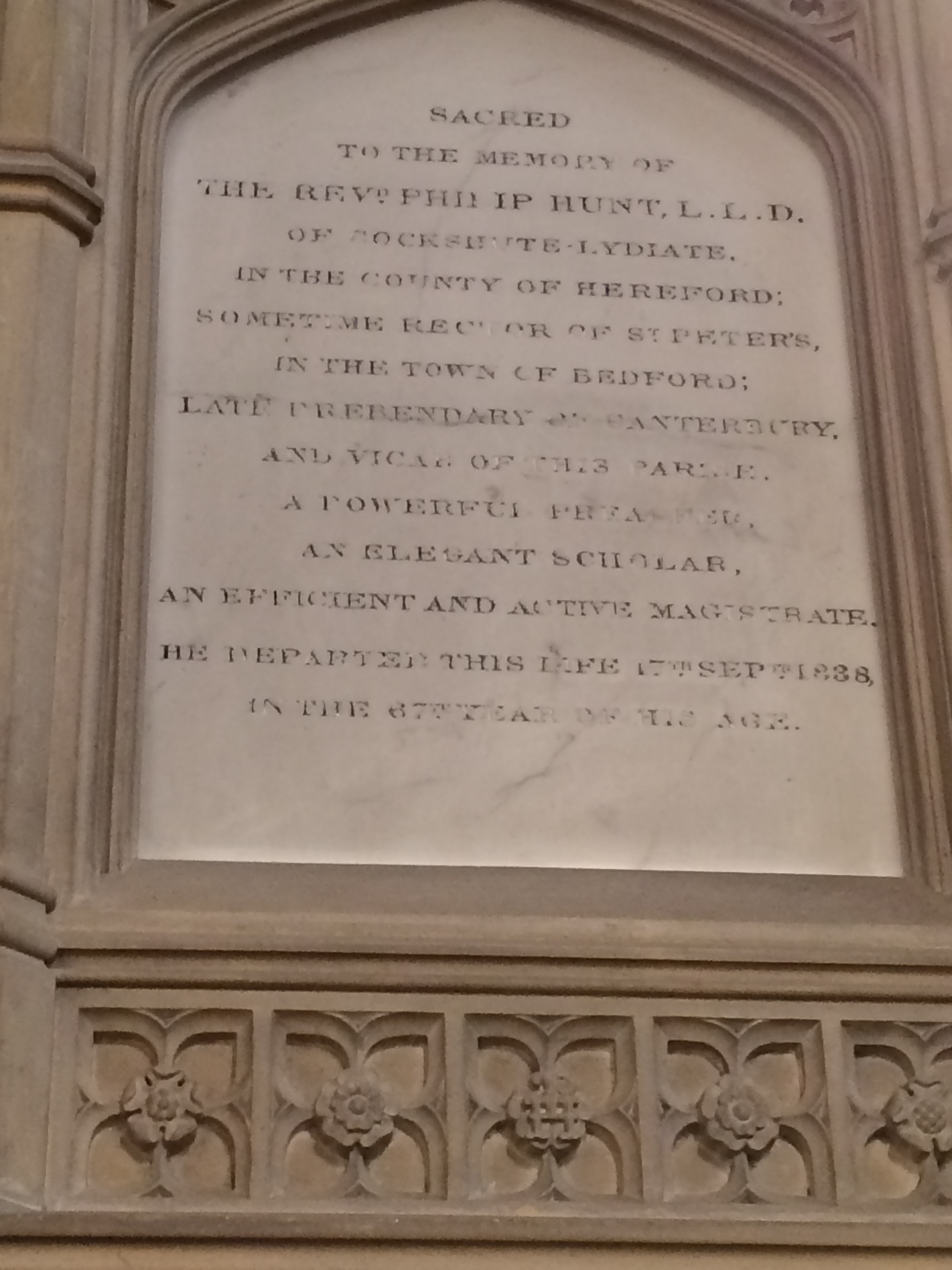
Memorial to Philip Hunt at the west end of St Michael's Church, Aylsham: "A powerful preacher, an elegant scholar, an efficient and active magistrate".

== Concerned magistrate ==
A magistrate in Bedfordshire from 1811, for three decades Hunt took an interest in Bedford Prison. He became known for his concerns on other social issues, also. Eric Stockdale mentions Hunt with Samuel Whitbread, also in Bedfordshire, as magistrates making a national impact. Hunt reported on possible development of the prison in 1816, for a committee including the sessions chairman William Wilshere. A printed report from the Bedford magistrates appeared in 1818, and Henry Grey Bennet cited Hunt on prison discipline from it; and in the debate leading to the Prisons Act 1823 Hunt suggested a clause on transfer of prisoners to Bennet.

In 1819 Hunt supported George Bowers as Bedford prison chaplain. In 1821 Charles Callis Western, visiting Bedford, gained the impression that Hunt was, as the only active local magistrate, the major figure in the town's public life. Hunt took a broader interest, laying charges that year against William Bridle, governor of Ilchester jail in Somerset; Bridle was the target of Henry Hunt the radical, who had been imprisoned at Ilchester, and was dismissed for brutality. In 1823 Hunt reported positively to the Home Office on the Bedford Prison treadmill.

In 1824 Hunt appeared as a witness for a parliamentary committee on labourers' wages. His view that "very few labourers married voluntarily" was cited in the Political Register of William Cobbett, and Francis Place wrote to him with approval. He also noted that relief under the Poor Laws was given without regard to character; and saw the spending on it as support for social order. Robert Harry Inglis, a Tory for whom Hunt had no time at all, was sessions chairman from 1825 to 1832, and opposed expenditure on the prison. In 1827, on the Game Laws, Hunt warned Robert Peel that magistrates reported only a fraction of offences from their sessions. In 1828 Sir Richard Phillips visited Hunt, and excepted him from his general view that clerics were unsuitable magistrates.

In later life Hunt's views as a prison reformer hardened. At the time of the 1830 Bedfordshire riots, he with Samuel Charles Whitbread swore in 50 special constables at Bedford. At this period Hunt introduced a stiffer regime in the prison, possibly affected by local disorder, arson and recidivism. A visitor gave in evidence to a House of Lords committee that Hunt did not have the backing of the governors for the changes. In 1835 he testified on poaching to a Select Committee of Parliament, the topic on which he had written to Peel as Home Secretary eight years before, with his view that the offences were treated too severely, and the magistrates were biased in favour of game preservation, a point expressed by Henry Brougham in parliament in 1828.

== Honours, awards and learned societies ==
Hunt while in Ireland with the Duke of Bedford was awarded an honorary LL.D. degree by Trinity College, Dublin in 1807. It was incorporated at Cambridge in 1818 (also M.A., Dublin; LL.B. of Dublin, 1807). He was an honorary member of the Dublin Society, and of the Literary and Philosophical Society of Newcastle upon Tyne, and served on the Council of the Society of Antiquaries of London. He was also a member of the Numismatic Society.

== Works ==
Hunt wrote two reports for the government based on his intelligence work in the Morea in 1801, the first being more confident about the local forces and their potential to resist invasion than the second. He assessed the local pashas and beys, the voivode of Patras, and Theodosios the dragoman of the Morea. A letter composed by Hunt in 1805, during his detention in France, was the basis of Elgin's Memorandum (1810, anonymous) on the marbles, at least as far as their description was concerned.

As a figure in the scandal Hunt was drawn into the Tweddell remains affair, a controversy over the papers and other possessions of John Tweddell, who had died in 1799 in Athens: one of Hunt's first tasks in Constantinople had concerned these remains. He wrote A Narrative of What Is Known Respecting the Literary Remains of the Late John Tweddell (1816) to support Elgin's self-exculpation in the matter, in reply to The Remains of John Tweddell (1815) issued by Robert Tweddell. He conceded he had copied notes of Tweddell's.

Hunt contributed to the Memoirs Relating to European and Asiatic Turkey of Robert Walpole. He also wrote letterpress for a privately printed 1822 work on the Woburn Abbey marbles, illustrated by drawings of Henry Corbould engraved by Henry Moses.
