= Tweddell remains affair =

19th century British controversy

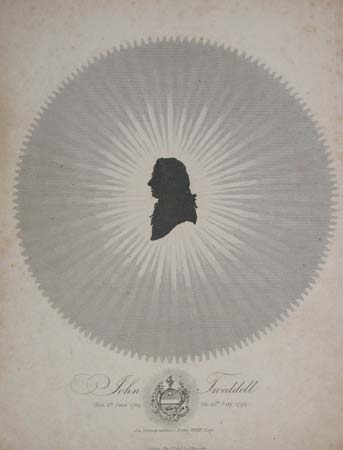
John Tweddell, silhouette portrait

The Tweddell remains affair was a British scandal that came to a head in the years 1815–17. It was a controversy over the papers, paintings and other possessions of John Tweddell, a young barrister and scholar who had died in 1799 in Athens. It was conducted mostly by publications in periodicals and a book by Robert Tweddell, who directed animus for the apparent neglect of the remains at Lord Elgin. William St Clair calls the affair a "first-class scandal". In the background, the Levant Company had felt that their monopoly on trade around the Aegean Sea had been threatened by Elgin as ambassador in Constantinople, and wished to undermine further such appointments.

== Background ==
During his travels Tweddell sent home a series of letters. Much of his time was occupied in keeping detailed journals; a large part of them was deposited at Pera, Constantinople with Thomas Thornton, as bulky. Tweddell engaged Michel-François Préaulx, a French artist whom he met at Constantinople, to travel with him in Greece, and to assist him in copying architectural detail in Athens; he also drew for Tweddell on Mount Athos. Tweddell encountered Louis-François-Sébastien Fauvel too, at Athens in 1798/9, and acquired dozens of his drawings, which went with his papers. These were deposited with Procopio Macri (Prokopios Makris), who acted as consul in Athens for the Levant Company.

After Tweddell's death Thomas Bruce, 7th Earl of Elgin, arriving at Constantinople as ambassador, ordered Tweddell's collections to be sent to him.

== Tracking the remains ==
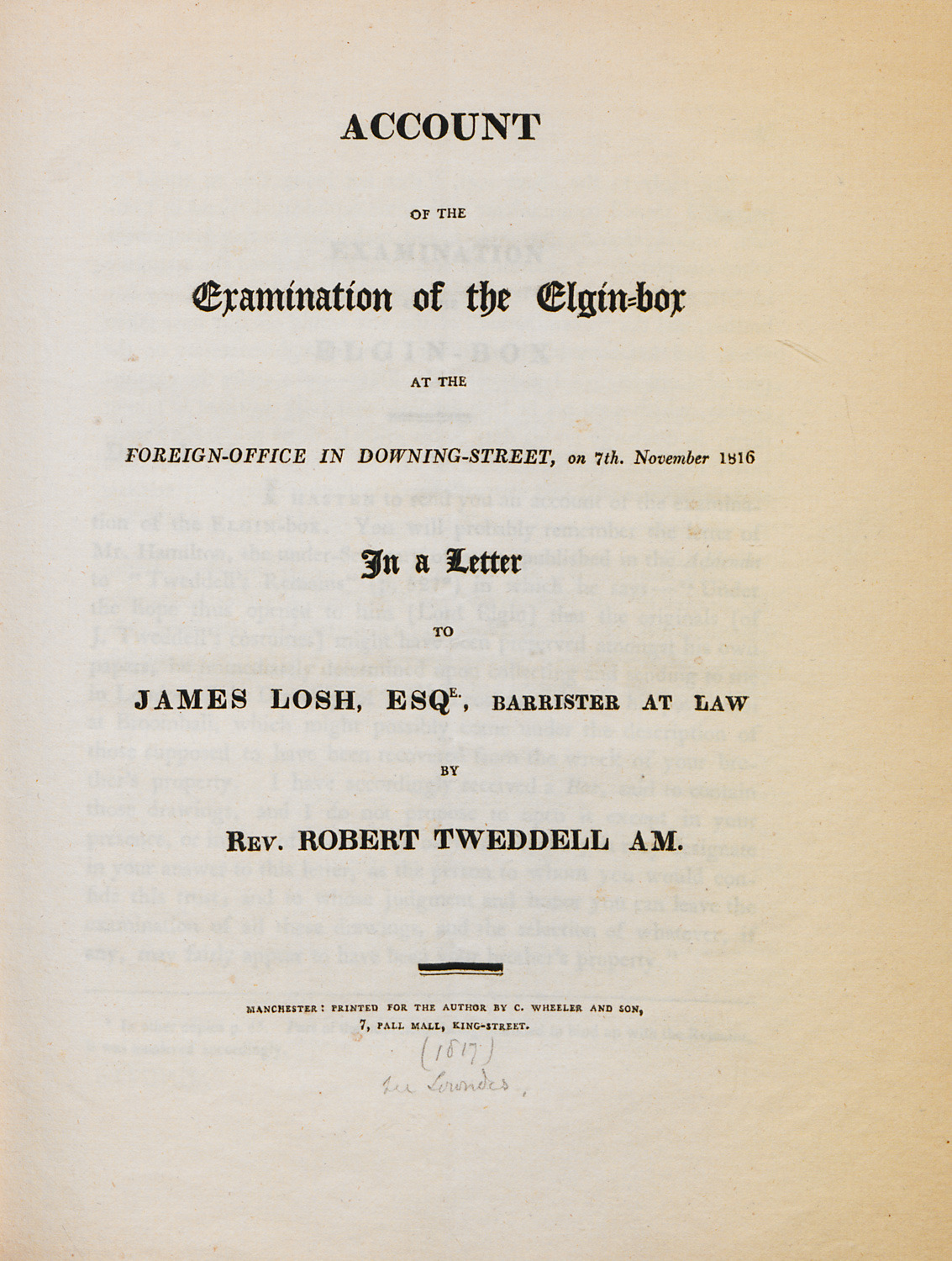
Account of the examination of the Elgin-box at the Foreign-Office in Downing-Street, on 7th.November 1816, by Robert Tweddell

The subsequent fate of Tweddell's remains is still obscure, but was aired in controversy some years later. Journals and pictures had disappeared, and Tweddell's brother Robert subsequently accused Elgin of appropriating them. Elgin's account of their handling was supported by his chaplain Philip Hunt; his reply to the charges was not published till 1816. Robert Tweddell was supported by Edward Daniel Clarke, by Thornton, and by John Spencer Smith, Elgin's predecessor.

Some had in fact been sent home via William Hamilton Nisbet, Elgin's father-in-law, others with Thornton had been lost by fire; and a third collection in a trunk had suffered water damage, were given to Joseph Dacre Carlyle and Hunt to sort, and were lost track of, though on Hunt's account they were sent in a merchant ship.

== Controversy ==
Thomas Thornton, who had had care of some of Tweddell's remains, mentioned their fate in his The Present State of Turkey (2nd edition, 1809), and was picked up on by an anonymous reviewer (in fact John Spencer Smith, who held a grudge against Elgin), in the Naval Chronicle. Tweddell's brother Robert then pursued the matter. Ranged against Elgin were also Edward Daniel Clarke, whose brother James Stanier Clarke edited the Naval Chronicle, and the Levant Company. Elgin had support in two anonymous (as was customary) articles in the Quarterly Review, a Tory journal that took against Tweddell's liberalism; the first was substantially the work of Charles James Blomfield, the second of John Wilson Croker.

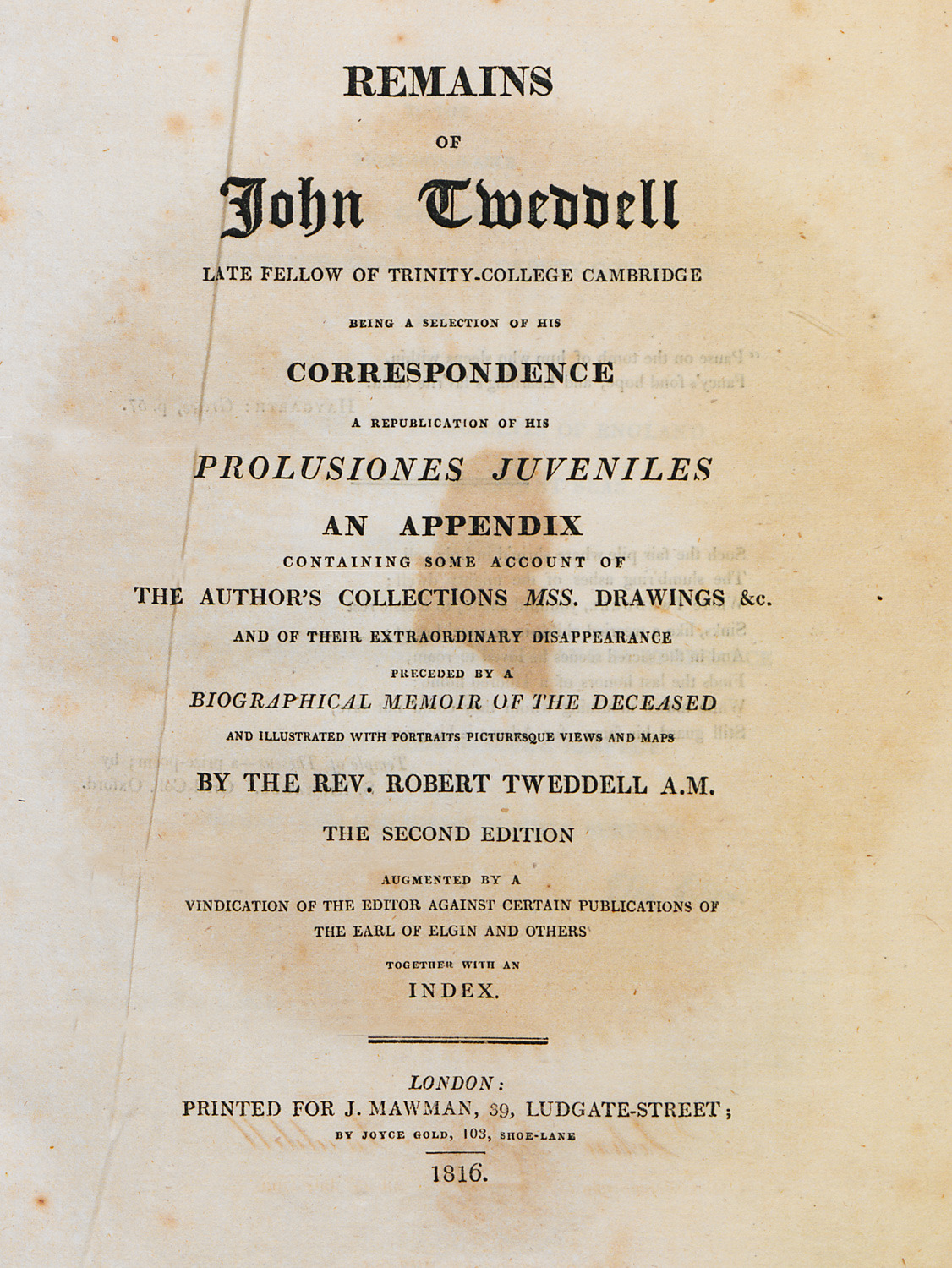
Title page of Remains of John Tweddell, a follow up of the earlier publication Account of the examination of the Elgin-box by Robert Tweddell

Hunt wrote A Narrative of What Is Known Respecting the Literary Remains of the Late John Tweddell (1816) to support Elgin's self-exculpation in the matter, in reply to The Remains of John Tweddell (1815) issued by Robert Tweddell. He conceded he had copied notes of Tweddell's.

== Resolution ==
The matter achieved closure when in late 1816 Nisbet turned over drawings sent with him by Elgin to Robert Tweddell. William Richard Hamilton, who had been a private secretary to Elgin in Constantinople, met Robert Tweddell's representatives, John Heys (an undergraduate acquaintance of John Tweddell) and Abraham Moore, at the Foreign Office on 7 November. There were two boxes of pictures that had been returned by Nesbit to Elgin to examine: Tweddell had been provided with copies by Nesbit of pictures of Turkish costumes. A division of the contents of the boxes produced 112 pictures to turn over to Tweddell, with pictures identifiable as by Saverio della Gatta (Xavier Gatta) retained for Elgin; and a minute of the meeting was published.
