= Nicolo Giraud =

Mediterranean friend of Lord Byron

Nicolo or Nicolas Giraud (c. 1795 – after 1815) was a friend of the English Romantic poet Lord Byron. The two met in 1809 while Byron was staying in Athens. Giraud, who at that time of their relationship was a fourteen-year-old majordomo and then a student at the Capuchin monastery in Athens, reportedly taught Byron Italian, and was his travel companion in Greece. Byron paid for Giraud's education and left him £7,000 (about £480,000 in 2025) in his will. Years after they parted company, Byron changed his will to exclude Giraud. Other than his involvement with Byron, little is known of Giraud's life.

The relationship between Byron and Giraud has become a topic of interest among scholars and biographers of Byron. Some believe that the pair's interaction was platonic, while others, citing contemporary opinion and correspondence between Byron and his friends, argue that Byron engaged in sexual activity with Giraud. The earliest textual claim of a sexual relationship comes from the anonymous 19th-century poem Don Leon, believed to have been written by someone in Byron's social circle, in which the poet is the principal character and Giraud is portrayed as his liberator from the sexual prejudices in Britain.

== Life ==
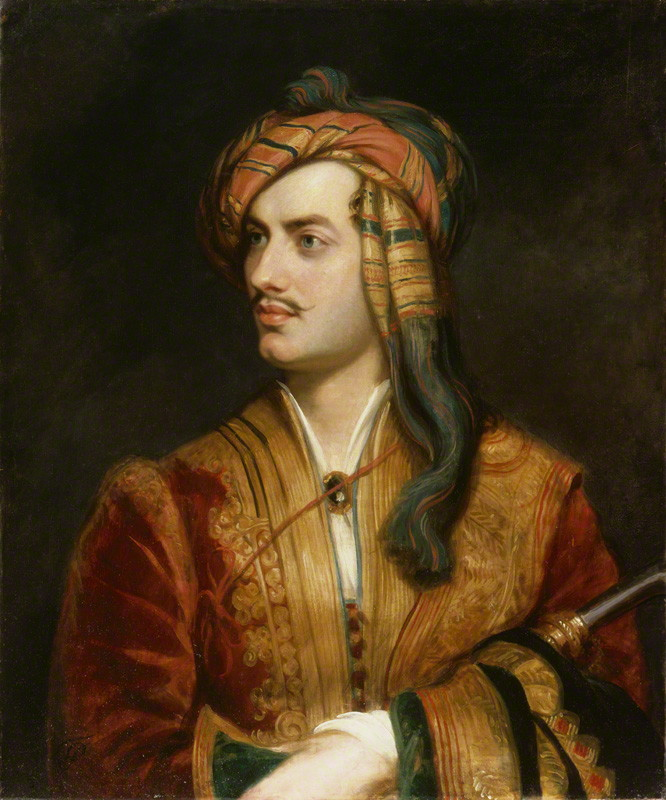
Lord Byron in Albanian Dress in 1813, by Thomas Phillips

Nicolas Giraud was born in Greece to French parents; the name by which he is most commonly known, Nicolo, was given to him by Byron. Giraud may have been the brother-in-law of Giovanni Battista Lusieri, a Roman painter and broker for Lord Elgin. (Note: Some biographers, such as Fiona MacCarthy, simply declare Giraud to be "brother to Lusieri's French wife" (MacCarthy p. 128). Other biographers, including Phyllis Grosskurth, are unwilling to state with such certainty, instead saying Giraud was "supposedly the brother of Lusieri's 'wife'" (Grosskurth p. 103). Neither provides a source for the declaration of "brother-in-law".) Demetrius Zograffo, Byron's guide in Greece, informed Byron that the 60-year-old Lusieri was unmarried, and was courting two women, each of whom believed that Lusieri was to marry her. Lusieri certainly had a close relationship with Giraud, so it is possible that the two were related in another way, perhaps as father and son.

Byron met Giraud in Athens in January 1809 when he was fourteen, and later paid for Nicolo to study at the Capuchin monastery in Athens. In 1810, Giraud began to teach Byron Italian. The two spent their days studying and swimming, while Byron intermittently composed poetry. In a letter to John Hobhouse, dated 23 August 1810 and written at the Capuchin monastery of Mendele near Athens where he was residing, Byron states:

But my friend, as you may easily imagine, is Nicolo who by-the-by, is my Italian master, and we are already very philosophical. I am his "Padrone" and his "amico", and the Lord knows what besides. It is about two hours since, that, after informing me he was most desirous to follow him (that is me) over the world, he concluded by telling me it was proper for us not only to live, but "morire insieme" [die together]. The latter I hope to avoid – as much of the former as he pleases.

In 1809, Giraud developed a dangerous fever and Byron took him to visit Charles Lewis Meryon, an English doctor who recounted the visit in his memoirs and noted Byron's vivid interest in the boy. Afterwards, one of Byron's Albanian servants, Vassily, claimed that Meryon diagnosed Giraud with internal injuries and early signs of septicaemia resulting from an anal rupture, an injury consistent with sexual abuse. Meryon was the private physician of Lady Hester Stanhope, who was at that time travelling with Michael Bruce, a friend of Byron's from Cambridge. Accounts from Bruce and Howe Browne, both witnesses to Byron's interactions with Giraud, provided confirmation of the relationship to Byron's early biographer Thomas Moore.

In mid-1810, Giraud acted as Byron's majordomo on their travels to the Peloponnese, and took care of Byron during his illness while at Patras, eventually becoming ill himself. After recovering, although still weak, the pair continued on their travels, arriving at Athens on 13 October. By November they were joined by Lusieri, Louis François Sébastien Fauvel, who was a French consul, and a group of German academics.

Byron and Giraud parted in Valletta, Malta. Byron saw to Giraud's education by paying for his schooling in a monastery on the island. The two stayed in contact by letter, and after a year Giraud left the monastery, telling Byron that he was tired of the company of monks. Shortly after Giraud left Malta, Byron drew up for him in his will a bequest of £7,000 (£480,000 in 2025), almost twice as much as he later lent for refitting the Greek Navy. The will read: "To Nicolo Giraud of Athens, subject of France, but born in Greece, the sume of seven thousand pounds sterling, to be paid from the sale of such parts of Rochdale, Newstead or elsewhere, as may enable the said Nicolo Giraud ... to receive the above sum on his attaining the age of twenty-one years." Byron later removed Giraud from his will (as he did with John Edleston – who predeceased him – and other boy companions).

Giraud wrote to Byron in January 1815:

My most precious Master, I cannot describe the grief of my heart at not seeing you for such a long time. Ah, if only I were a bird and could fly so as to come and see you for one hour, and I would be happy to die at the same time. Hope tells me that I shall see you again and that is my consolation for not dying immediately. It is two years now since I spoke English. I have completely forgotten it.

Byron had not been responding to Nicolo's letters, which Nicolo mentions in the letter: "It is now almost three years that I am at Athens; and have sent you many letters, but I have not received any answer". It is possible that Byron did not respond because he was married and, according to the 20th-century Byron biographer Phyllis Grosskurth, "Nicolo was the last person he would have wanted to hear from."

== Relationship with Byron ==
Early biographers, who had a tendency to idealise Byron, generally depicted his relationship with Giraud as platonic, generous and paternal. Moore, Byron's friend and chosen biographer, described the relationship between Byron and Giraud as:

one of those extraordinary friendships – if attachment to persons so inferior to himself can be called by that name – of which I have already mentioned two or three instances in his younger days, and in which the pride of being a protector, and the pleasure of exerting gratitude, seem to have constituted to his mind the chief, pervading charm. The person, whom he now adopted in this manner, and from similar feelings to those which had inspired his early attachments to the cottage-boy near Newstead, and the young chorister at Cambridge, was a Greek youth, named Nicolo Giraud, the son, I believe, of a widow lady, in whose house the artist Lusieri lodged. In this young man he appear[s] to have taken the most lively, and even brotherly, interest.

However, it is worth noting that Moore's stance was criticised by Byron's close friend John Hobhouse, who claimed that "Moore had not the remotest guess at the real reason which induced Lord B. at that time to prefer having no Englishman immediately or constantly near him."

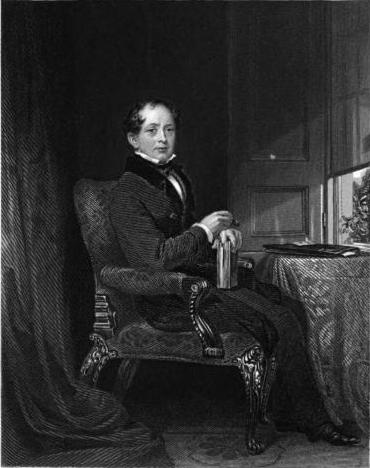
Thomas Moore, Byron's early biographer

Early 20th-century biographer André Maurois argued that "what Byron was capable of loving in another was a certain kind of innocence and youthfulness" and that the relationship was one of Byron's "protective passions". Likewise, G. Wilson Knight, in his 1953 biography of Byron, claimed that Byron became protective over Giraud just as he did with all of the children he met during his travels. Giraud was special to Byron, and, according to Knight, "it was probably of Nicolo that he was thinking when he wrote that Greece was 'the only place I was ever contented in'". In Byron: A Biography, published in 1957, Marchand pointed out that Byron "wished Hobhouse there to share the nonsensical gaiety" of when Byron and Giraud were together, but changed his mind after remembering that Hobhouse's personality would not be conducive to entertainment. Their time together "was a relaxed pleasure that [Byron] was to remember more fondly than most of the adventures of his travels".

Later critics and biographers have frequently asserted that the relationship between Byron and Nicolo was sexual, and should be viewed as part of a pattern in Byron's life of sexual engagement with socially inferior young boys. For instance, the early 20th-century biographer Ethel Mayne pointed out both the frequency of such relationships in Byron's life and their inherent ambiguity. She notes that Nicolo's "stay was also marked by one of those ambiguous friendships with a youth infinitely below him in rank which have already been seen to recur in his life ... The patron was supposed to be learning Italian from [Girard]; this made a pretext for giving him, on their parting at Malta in 1811 ... a considerable sum of money".

Christensen speculated that Byron's relationship with Giraud was sexual and transactional, writing that "although there is no evidence that Lord Byron... was ever so vulgar as to set an exact market value on his sexual arrangements in Greece, Nicolo Giraud... was employed as 'dragoman and Major Domo', a position that almost certainly entailed payment in love and money". D. L. MacDonald's 1986 biography described Giraud as "The great love of Byron's Eastern tour", and D. S. Neff's 2002 work describes the two as part of "an amorous relationship". Others, such Jay Losey and William Brewer in their analysis of 19th-century sexuality, speculate that Byron's relationship with Giraud was modeled on a Grecian form of pederasty, and homosexual studies scholar Louis Crompton believes that pederasty was a facet of Byron's life and that his letters hinted towards a sexual relationship between Byron and Giraud. As Paul Douglass, in an analysis of Byron biographical studies, points out, Crompton also claims that biographers like Marchand ignored the nature of Byron's relationship with Giraud. Douglass also mentions that Crompton's work, Byron and Greek Love "focuses Byron's life around a single issue, rather than attempting to create a larger view. Such studies prompt negative responses from those who feel the writer warps Byron to fit the theme, presenting a one-sided account".

Benita Eisler, in 2000, argued that Giraud was one of many of Byron's intended sexual conquests. Eisler claimed that Byron was at first unable to attain "that state of total and complete satisfaction" of a sexual relationship with Giraud, but wrote to Charles Matthews declaring that he would soon conquer any of the boy's remaining inhibitions. During Byron's illness, Byron boasted to Hobhouse and Lady Melbourne that he continued to have sex with one such incident almost causing his death. Although it is uncertain, according to Eisler, "Whether this surfeit of erotic fulfillment involved only Nicolo as partner, he does not say. He was still fond enough of the boy, but his sexual obsession, with its attendant scorekeeping, seems to have run its course." Nigel Leask, in 2004, argues that Hobhouse would have disapproved of Byron's relationship with Giraud, and Fiona MacCarthy notes in her 2002 biography that Lady Melbourne "would have understood his partner to be female".

In a survey of the various biographical opinions and disagreements about Byron's relationships, including Giraud, written before 2004, Douglass points out that "despite the greater certainty about his sexual ambivalence, the exact nature of those relationships remains elusive".

=== Don Leon ===
An unknown author anonymously wrote a poem called Don Leon that, according to Bernard Grebanier, "depicts Byron as having wooed Giraud with gifts when they first met, and to have busied himself with developing the boy's mind".

The narrator of Don Leon praises Giraud and claims that Giraud was so beautiful that he:

Gave pleasing doubts of what his sex might be;
And who that saw him would perplexed have been,
For beauty marked his gender epicoene.

Throughout the poem, the narrator describes how Byron (Don Leon) spent his time with Giraud:

Spent half in love and half in poetry!
The muse each morn I wooed, each eve the boy,
And tasted sweets that never seemed to cloy.

The poem ends with Giraud's beauty conquering any fears that Byron may have about their relationship:

But thou, Giraud, whose beauty would unlock
The gates of prejudice, and bid me mock
The sober fears that timid minds endure,
Whose ardent passions women only cure,
Receive this faithful tribute to thy charms,
Not vowed alone, but paid too in thy arms.
For here the wish, long cherished, long denied,
Within that monkish cell was gratified.

G. Wilson Knight, unlike most early critics, thought the poem was worthy of response, although he says that it was from "the most indecent poet of high quality in our literature". Grebanier believes that Colman, as "a recipient of Byron's confidence during a crucial period of the poet's life, and as a man who shared Byron's hatred of pretense ... must have seen an ideal subject in presenting ruthlessly, even brutally, the basic truths about Byron's moral dilemma, as a powerful means of blasting once more that sanctimoniousness which has always been fashionable in Britain." Colman's purpose was not necessarily to discuss Giraud, but to respond to those who spread rumours about Byron and criticized Byron for his failed marriage, the reason for his exile. The poem does focus on Giraud, and, as Grebanier argues, "If, the poem says, our hero's affections were fastened upon Nicolo Giraud" then Byron's actions are acceptable because "he was but following the custom of the country. Once he had seen a beautiful Ganymede of fifteen attending the Turkish Governor, a Grecian youth, publicly known as the Governor's 'catamite.' Was it criminal to do what the Governor was doing?"

Byrne Fone, a historian of homosexuality-related issues, emphasizes how the poem and the fictional discussion of Giraud and Byron's relationship reveal insights into 19th-century British views on homosexuality. To Fone, the poem was written by one who knew Byron and reveals Byron's homosexuality. Fone also argues that the 1833 publication of the poem was prompted by the arrest of William Bankes, a homosexual friend of Byron, and the execution of Henry Nicholls for homosexual activity. The opening lines of the poem mention "crippled Talleyrand", William Beckford and William Courtenay. Fone argues that the references to Beckford and Courtenay are used both to talk about the unfair treatment of homosexual men who had committed no real crime, and to emphasise England's hypocrisy when it comes to sex. The poem then claims that England's treatment of homosexuals forces Don Leon to travel to Greece in order to fulfill his desires and be free of intellectual control, which is fulfilled when Don Leon is able to be with Giraud. The fictional Giraud, according to Fone, allows Don Leon to break free of the homophobia of England. The poem, as he points out, tries to convince Moore to mention Byron's homosexual desires. Fone concludes, "It is not only the poem that is an effective attack on homophobic prejudice, but the example of the poet himself."
