= Elgin Marbles =

Ancient Greek sculptures held in London

Coordinates: 51.5192°N 0.1283°W

- Parthenon Marbles (British Museum)
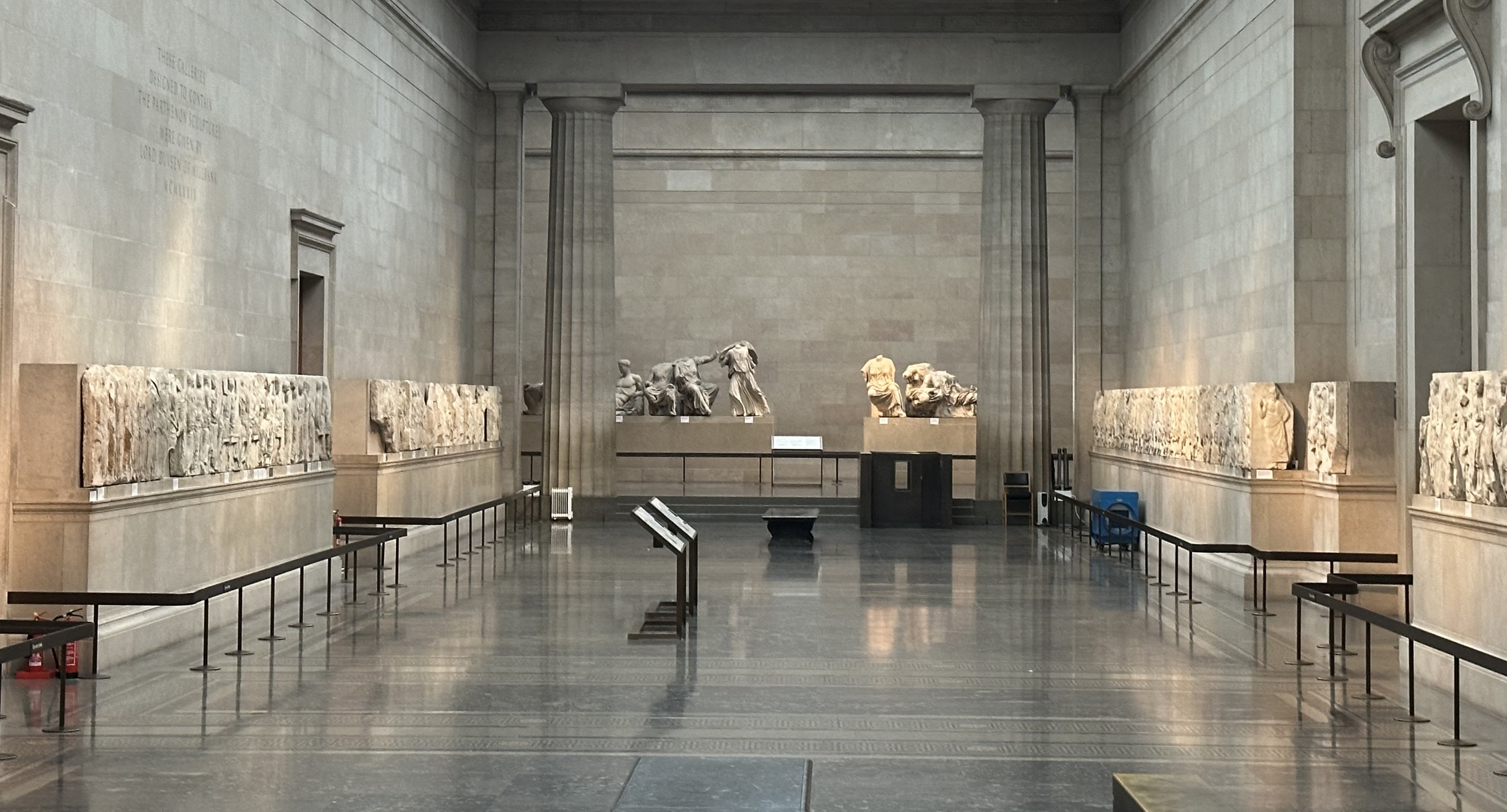
- Artist: Phidias
- Year: c. 447–438 BC
- Type: Marble sculpture
- Dimensions: 75 m (3,000 in)
- Location: British Museum, London

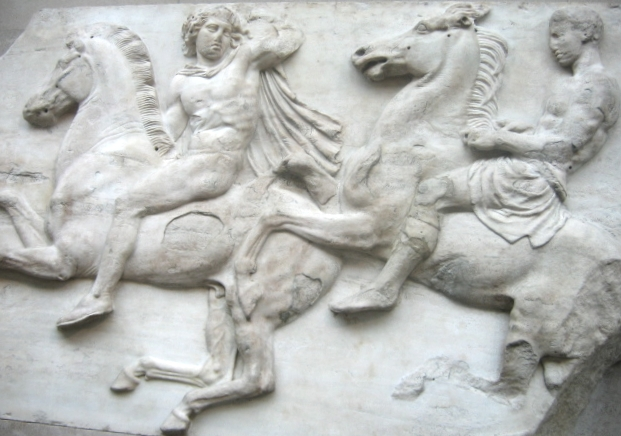
Western frieze, II, 2

The Elgin Marbles (/ˈɛlɡɪn/ EL-ghin) are a collection of Ancient Greek sculptures from the Parthenon and other structures from the Acropolis of Athens, removed from Ottoman Greece in the early 19th century and shipped to Britain by agents of Thomas Bruce, 7th Earl of Elgin, and now held in the British Museum in London. The majority of the sculptures were created in the 5th century BC under the direction of sculptor and architect Phidias.

The term Parthenon Marbles or Parthenon Sculptures (Greek: Γλυπτά του Παρθενώνα) refers to sculptures—the frieze, metopes and pediments—from the Parthenon held in various collections, principally the British Museum and the Acropolis Museum in Athens.

From 1801 to 1812, Elgin's agents removed about half the surviving Parthenon sculptures, as well as sculptures from the Erechtheion, the Temple of Athena Nike, and the Propylaia, sending them to Britain in efforts to establish a private museum. Elgin said that he removed the sculptures with the permission of the Ottoman officials who exercised authority in Athens at the time. The legality of Elgin's actions has been disputed.

Their presence in the British Museum is the subject of longstanding international controversy. In Britain, the acquisition of the collection was supported by some, while others, such as Lord Byron, likened Elgin's actions to vandalism or looting. A British parliamentary inquiry in 1816 concluded that Elgin had acquired the marbles legally. Elgin sold them to the British government in that year, after which they passed into the trusteeship of the British Museum. In 1983, the Greek government formally asked the British government to return them to Greece and listed the dispute with UNESCO. The British government and the British Museum declined UNESCO's offer of mediation. In 2021, UNESCO called upon the British government to resolve the issue at the intergovernmental level.

The Greek government and supporters of the marbles' return to Greece have argued that they were obtained illegally or unethically, that they are of exceptional cultural importance to Greece, and that their cultural value would be best appreciated in a unified public display with the other major Parthenon antiquities in the Acropolis Museum. The British government and the British Museum have argued that they were obtained legally, that their return would set a precedent which could undermine the collections of the major museums of world culture, and that the British Museum's collection allows them to be better viewed in the context of other major ancient cultures and thus complements the perspective provided by the Acropolis Museum. Discussions between British and Greek officials are ongoing.

== Name ==
The Elgin Marbles are named after the 7th Earl of Elgin, who, between 1801 and 1812, oversaw their removal from the Parthenon, the Erechtheion, the Temple of Athena Nike and the Propylaia and their shipment to England. By an act of parliament, the British Museum Act 1816, the collection was transferred to the British Museum on the condition that it be kept together and named "the Elgin Marbles". The term "Parthenon Marbles" or "Parthenon Sculptures" refers to the sculptures and architectural features removed specifically from the Parthenon. These are currently held in seven museums around the world, principally the Acropolis Museum and the British Museum. The term "Parthenon Sculptures" is used in this sense by both the British Museum and the Greek government.

Archaeologist Mario Trabucco della Torretta argues that while "Elgin Marbles" is the legal name of the collection, those advocating restitution prefer "Parthenon Sculptures".

== Background ==
The Parthenon was built on the Acropolis of Athens from 447 BCE as a temple to the goddess Athena. It is likely that Phidias was responsible for the sculptural design. In subsequent centuries the building was converted into a church and a mosque and the sculptures were extensively damaged, although the building remained structurally sound. During the Sixth Ottoman–Venetian War (1684–1699), the defending Turks fortified the Acropolis and used the Parthenon as a gunpowder store. On 26 September 1687, a Venetian artillery round ignited the gunpowder, and the resulting explosion blew out the central portion of the Parthenon and caused the cella's walls to crumble into rubble. Three of the four walls collapsed, or nearly so, and about three-fifths of the sculptures from the frieze fell. About 300 people were killed in the explosion, which showered marble fragments over a significant area. For the next century and a half, portions of the remaining structure were scavenged for building material and many valuable objects were removed.

== Acquisition ==
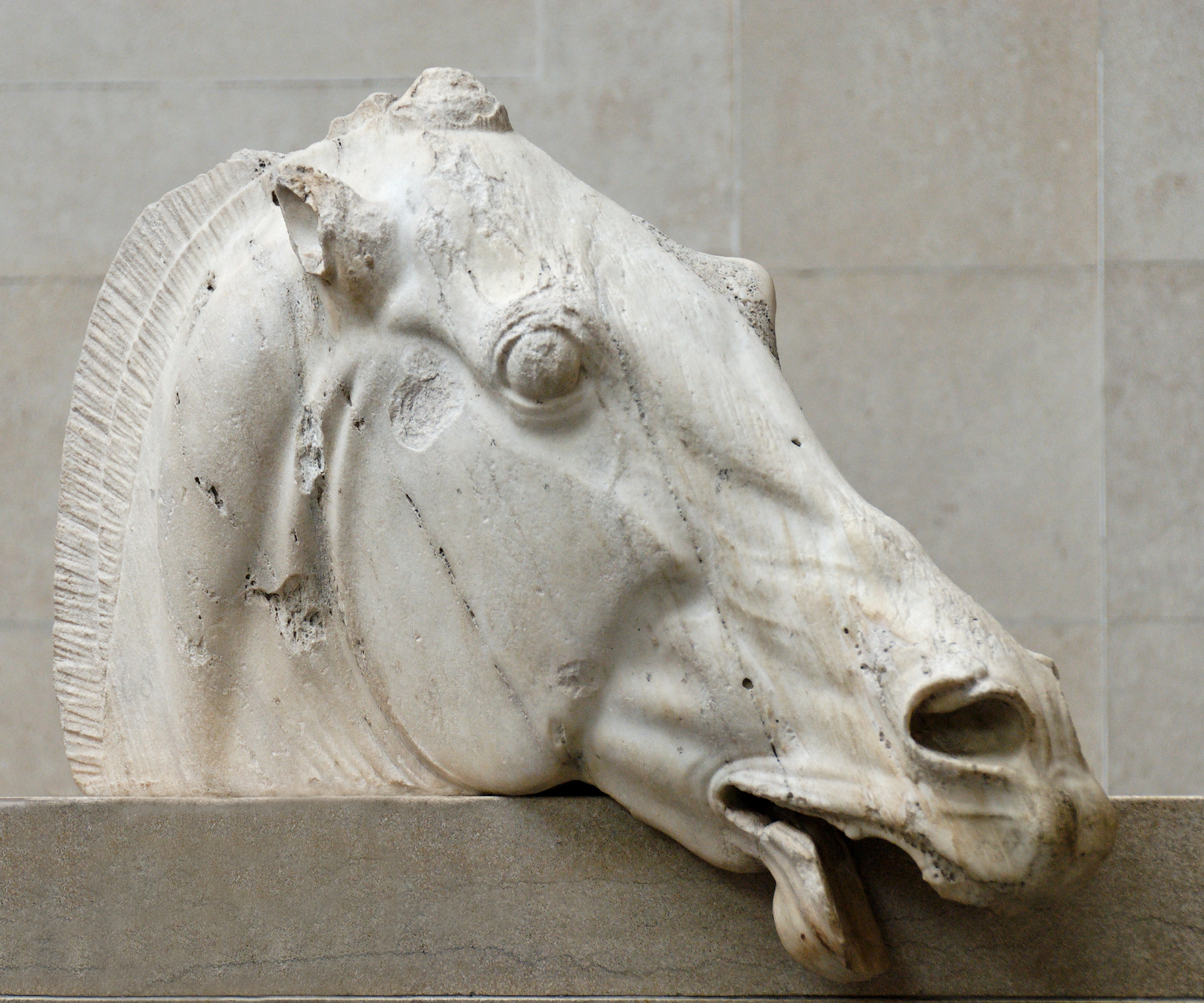
Parthenon Selene Horse

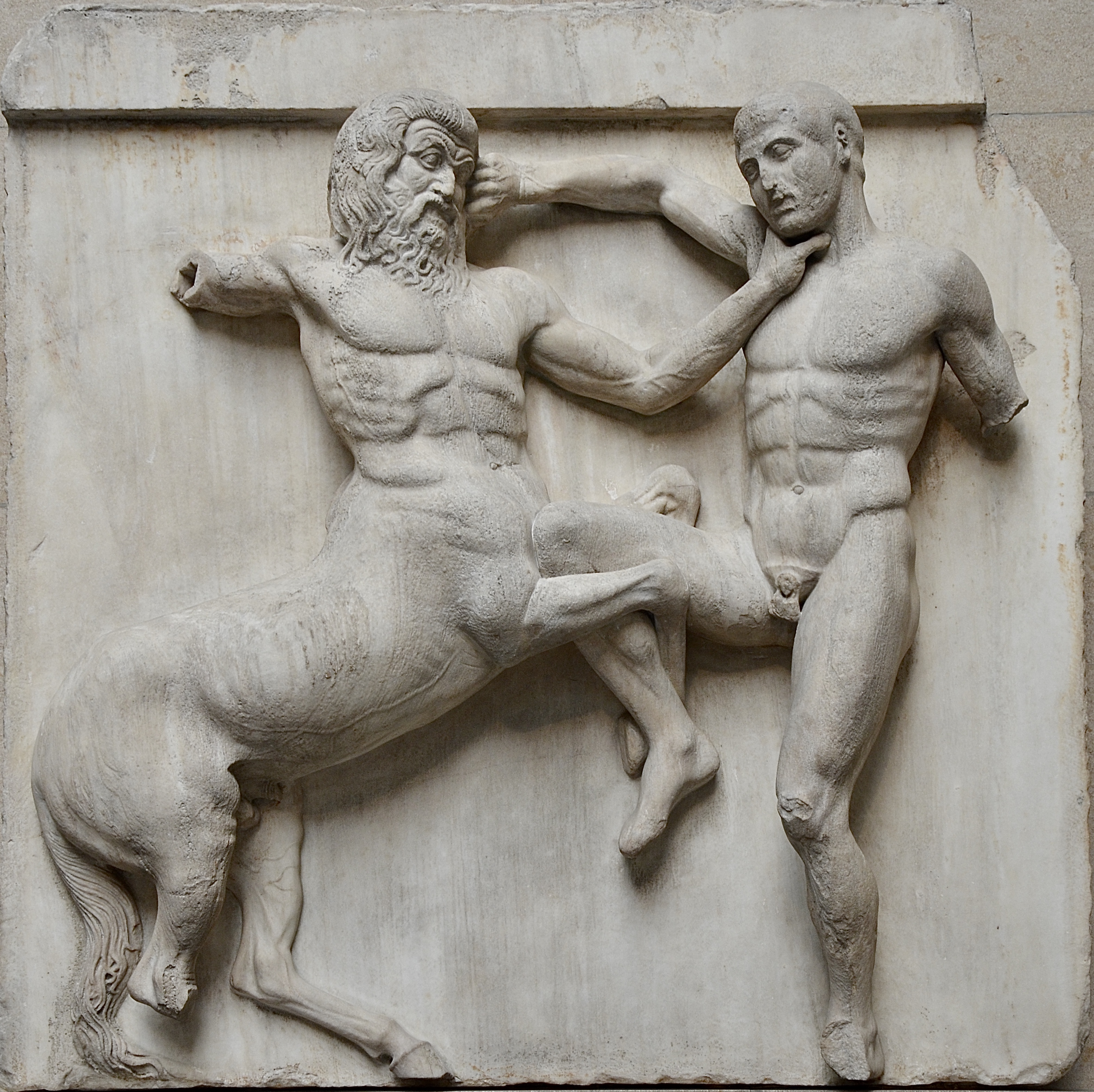
Metope from the Elgin Marbles depicting a Centaur and a Lapith fighting

In November 1798, the Earl of Elgin was appointed as "Ambassador Extraordinary and Minister Plenipotentiary of His Britannic Majesty to the Sublime Porte of Selim III, Sultan of Turkey" (Greece was then part of the Ottoman Empire). Before his departure to take up the post, he had approached officials of the British government to inquire if they would be interested in employing artists to take casts and drawings of the sculptured portions of the Parthenon. According to Elgin, "the answer of the Government ... was entirely negative."

Elgin decided to carry out the work himself, and employed artists to take casts and drawings under the supervision of the Neapolitan court painter, Giovanni Lusieri. Although his original intention was only to document the sculptures, in 1801 Elgin began to remove material from the Parthenon and its surrounding structures under the supervision of Lusieri. According to a Turkish local, marble sculptures that fell were being burned to obtain lime for building, and comparison with previously published drawings documented the state of rapid decay of the remains. Pieces were also removed from the Erechtheion, the Propylaia, and the Temple of Athena Nike, all inside the Acropolis.

They were brought from Greece to Malta, then a British protectorate, where they remained for a number of years until they were transported to Britain. The excavation and removal was completed in 1812 at a personal cost to Elgin of £74,240 (Note: Elgin also donated a town clock to Athens.) (equivalent to £5,990,000 in 2024 pounds). Elgin intended to use the marbles to enhance the art of Britain, and his ultimate goal had been for them to be purchased by the Government.

To build the case for the public expenditure, Elgin bought a house in London and set up the sculptures there as a private museum, making them accessible to artists, and eventually, the public. Elgin resumed negotiations for the sale of the collection to the British Museum in 1811, but talks failed when the government offered only £30,000; less than half of his expenses relating to them. The following years marked an increased interest in classical Greece, and Elgin procured testimonials from Ennio Quirino Visconti, director of the Louvre, and Antonio Canova of the Vatican Museums, who affirmed the high artistic value of the marbles. In 1816, a House of Commons Select Committee, established at Lord Elgin's request, found that they were of high artistic value and recommended that the government purchase them for £35,000 to further the cultivation of the fine arts in Britain. In June 1816, after further debate, parliament approved the purchase of the marbles by a vote of 82–30. The marbles were transferred to the British Museum on 8 August.

== Description ==
Annotated sectional view of the Parthenon with parts in the British Museum shaded

The marbles acquired by Elgin include some 21 figures from the statuary from the east and west pediments, 15 of an original 92 metope panels depicting battles between the Lapiths and the centaurs, as well as 75 metres of the Parthenon frieze which decorated the horizontal course set above the interior architrave of the temple. As such, they represent more than half of what now remains of the surviving sculptural decoration of the Parthenon.

Elgin's acquisitions also included objects from other buildings on the Athenian Acropolis – a caryatid from the Erechtheion; four slabs from the parapet frieze of the Temple of Athena Nike; and a number of other architectural fragments of the Parthenon, Propylaia, Erechtheion, and the Temple of Athena Nike – as well as the Treasury of Atreus in Mycenae.

The British Museum also holds additional fragments from the Acropolis, acquired from various collections without connection to Elgin, such as those of Léon-Jean-Joseph Dubois, William Cavendish, 6th Duke of Devonshire, and the Society of Dilettanti.

== Legality of removal from Athens ==
In February 1816, a House of Commons Select Committee held public hearings on whether Elgin had acquired the marbles legally and whether they should be purchased by the government. In his evidence to the committee, Elgin stated that the work of his agents at the Acropolis, and the removal of the marbles, were authorised by a firman (a generic term employed by Western travellers to signify any official Ottoman order) from the Ottoman government obtained in July 1801, and was undertaken with the approval of the voivode (civil governor of Athens) and the dizdar (military commander of the Acropolis citadel). In March 1810, another firman was obtained, authorising the second shipment of marbles from Athens to Britain. Elgin told the committee, "the thing was done publicly before the whole world ... and all the local authorities were concerned in it, as well as the Turkish government".

The committee cleared Elgin of all allegations that he had acquired the marbles illegally or had misused his powers as ambassador. Elgin's version of events, however, remains controversial. No official record of the July 1801 firman has been found in the Turkish archives. The original document was still in Athens in 1810, where it was seen by English writer John Galt, and was probably destroyed with the voivode's archives during the outbreak of the Greek Revolution in 1821. An Italian translation of the purported firman is held by the British Museum, and an English translation was submitted to the 1816 Select Committee. The document states in part,

that it be written and ordered that the said painters [Elgin's men] while they are occupied in entering and leaving by the gate of the Castle of the City, which is the place for their observations, in setting up scaffolding round the ancient temple of the Idols [the Parthenon], and taking moulds in lime paste (that is plaster) of the same ornaments, and visible figures, in measuring the remains of other ruined buildings, and in undertaking to excavate, according to need, the foundations to find any inscribed blocks, which may have been preserved in the rubble, be not disturbed, nor in any way impeded by the Commandant of the Castle, nor any other person, and that no one meddle with their scaffolding, and implements, which they may have made there; and should they wish to take away any pieces of stone with old inscriptions, and figures, that no opposition be made.

Vassilis Demetriades, of the University of Crete, argues that the document is not a firman (a decree from the Sultan), or a buyruldu (an order from the Grand Vizier), but a mektub (official letter) from the Sultan's acting Grand Vizier which did not have the force of law. Dyfri Williams states that although the document is not a firman in the technical sense, the term was widely used informally in diplomatic and court circles to refer to a range of official Ottoman documents. He argues that the document is possibly a buyruldu, but "[w]hatever the exact form of the document was, it clearly had to be obeyed, and it was." Historian Edhem Eldem also argues for the likely authenticity of the document and calls it a firman in the broad meaning of the word.

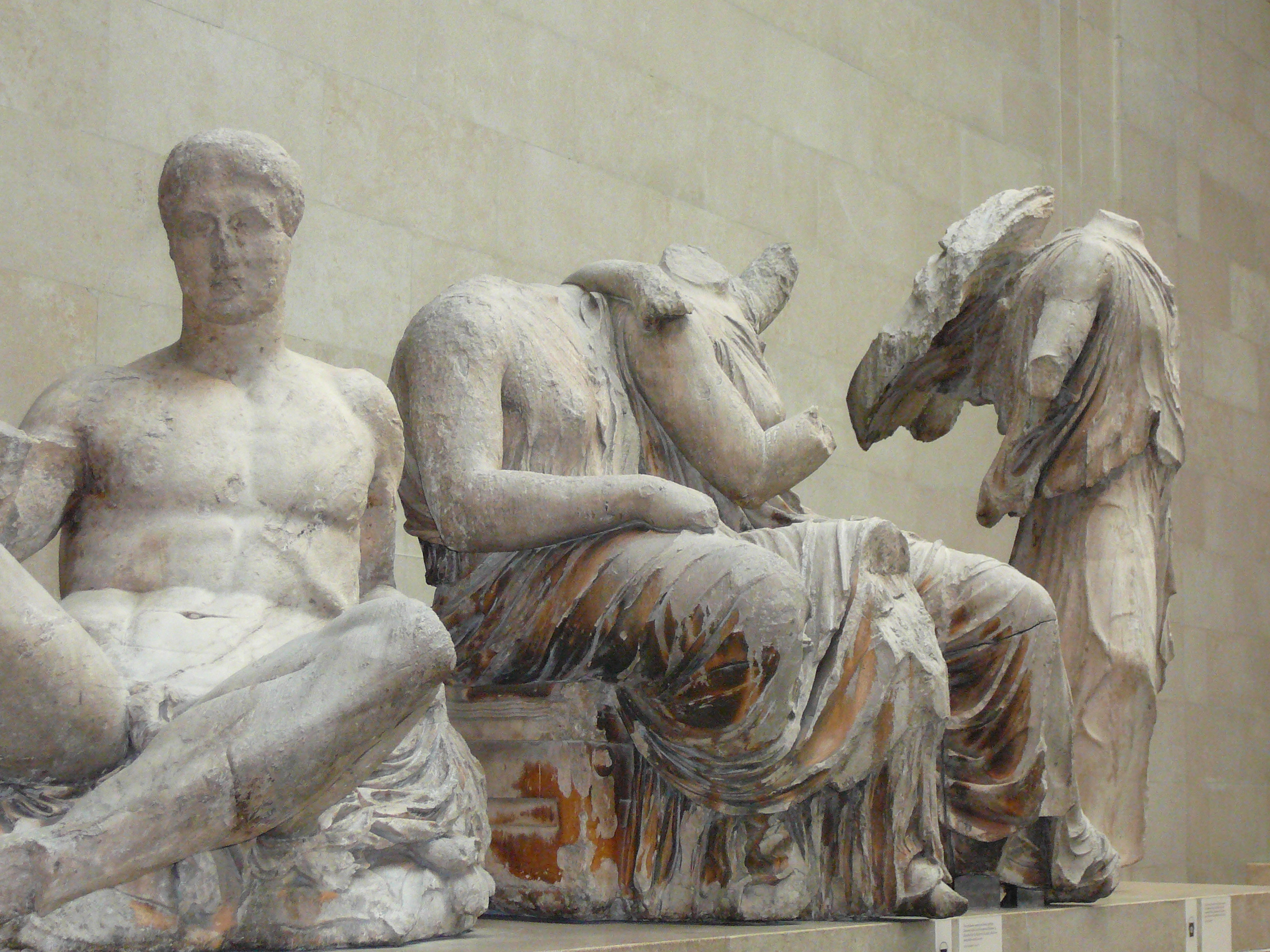
Statuary from the east pediment

There is debate over whether the document authorised Elgin's agents to remove sculptures attached to the Parthenon and other structures. Demetriades, David Rudenstine and others argue that the document only authorised Elgin's party to remove artefacts recovered from the permitted excavations, not those still attached to buildings. Williams argues that the document was "rather open ended" and that the civil governor agreed with the interpretation of clergyman Philip Hunt—who was attached to the party as Elgin's chaplain—that allowed them to remove sculptures fixed to buildings. Beard concludes, "No amount of poring over the text can provide the answer. As often with documents sent out from head office, the precise interpretation would rest with men carrying out the orders on the spot."

Legal academic John Henry Merryman argues that the document provides only "slender authority" for the removal of the fixed sculptures, but that legally Elgin's actions were ratified by the conduct of Ottoman officials. In 1802, Ottoman officials in Constantinople issued documents to the civil governor and the military commander of Athens ratifying their conduct and, in March 1810, issued a command allowing Elgin to transport a shipment of marbles from Greece to Britain.

Legal academic Catharine Titi states that Sir Robert Adair reported that the Ottomans in 1811 "absolutely denied" that Elgin had any property in the sculptures. Legal scholar Alexander Herman and historian Edhem Eldem state that documents in the Turkish archives show that this denial was only a delaying tactic for reasons of diplomacy, and that the Porte eventually granted permission for the transport of the marbles to Britain later in 1811. Mario Trabucco della Torretta suggests that the letter exchange with Adair may not refer to the sculptures from the Parthenon, but to the so-called "Second Collection"; a subsequent gathering of antiquities collected by Lusieri after Lord Elgin's departure from Athens in 1803.

A number of eyewitnesses to the removal of the marbles from the Acropolis, including members of Elgin's party, stated that expensive bribes and gifts to local officials were required to ensure their work progressed. Williams states that it was normal for the Disdar to be paid for access to the Acropolis and that an exchange of gifts with the voivode was normal practice.

Merryman argues that, even if proved, bribery would not have rendered the acquisition of the marbles illegal by the standards of the time:

The Ottomans who were bribed were the responsible officials. Whatever their motivation may have been, they had the legal authority to perform those actions. At a time and in a culture in which officials routinely had to be bribed to perform their legal duties (as is still true today in much of the world), the fact that bribes occurred was hardly a significant legal consideration.

Rudenstine states that further investigation would be required to determine whether, at the time, bribery would have been a significant legal consideration in such official transactions under Ottoman or British law. Herman argues that bribing officials was illegal under British and Ottoman law at the time, but that the Porte took no action against its officials in Athens and therefore tacitly tolerated their actions. Mario Trabucco della Torretta argues that the sums suspected as bribes were much smaller than previously claimed, were spread over the period 1803–1814, when most of the marbles had already been removed, and were most likely tips.

In May 2024, a spokesperson for Turkey, which is a successor or the continuing state of the Ottoman Empire, denied knowledge of the firman and stated that Turkey supported the return of the marbles. The spokesman stated that the marbles' removal was carried out by "UK colonialists", adding: "I don't think there's room to discuss its legality, even during the time and under the law of the time."

== Contemporary reaction ==
When, in 1807, Elgin put the first shipment of marbles on display in London they were "an instant success among many" who admired the sculptures and supported their arrival. The sculptor John Flaxman thought them superior to "the treasures of Italy", and Benjamin West called them "sublime specimens of the purest sculpture". Henry Fuseli was enthusiastic, and his friend Benjamin Haydon became a tireless advocate for their importance. The classicist Richard Payne Knight, however, declared they were Roman additions or the work of inferior craftsmen, and painter Ozias Humphry called them "a mass of ruins".

Lord Byron, a few years later, strongly objected to the removal of the marbles from Greece, denouncing Elgin as a vandal. In his narrative poem Childe Harold's Pilgrimage, published in 1812, he wrote in relation to the Parthenon:

Dull is the eye that will not weep to see
Thy walls defaced, thy mouldering shrines removed
By British hands, which it had best behoved
To guard those relics ne'er to be restored.
Curst be the hour when from their isle they roved,
And once again thy hapless bosom gored,
And snatch'd thy shrinking gods to northern climes abhorred!

Byron was not the only one to protest against the removal at the time. Sir John Newport said:

The Honourable Lord has taken advantage of the most unjustifiable means and has committed the most flagrant pillages. It was, it seems, fatal that a representative of our country loot those objects that the Turks and other barbarians had considered sacred.

Edward Daniel Clarke witnessed the removal of the metopes and called the action a "spoliation", writing that "thus the form of the temple has sustained a greater injury than it had already experienced from the Venetian artillery", and that "neither was there a workman employed in the undertaking ... who did not express his concern that such havoc should be deemed necessary, after moulds and casts had been already made of all the sculpture which it was designed to remove." When Sir Francis Ronalds visited Athens and Giovanni Battista Lusieri in 1820, he wrote that "If Lord Elgin had possessed real taste in lieu of a covetous spirit he would have done just the reverse of what he has, he would have removed the rubbish and left the antiquities."

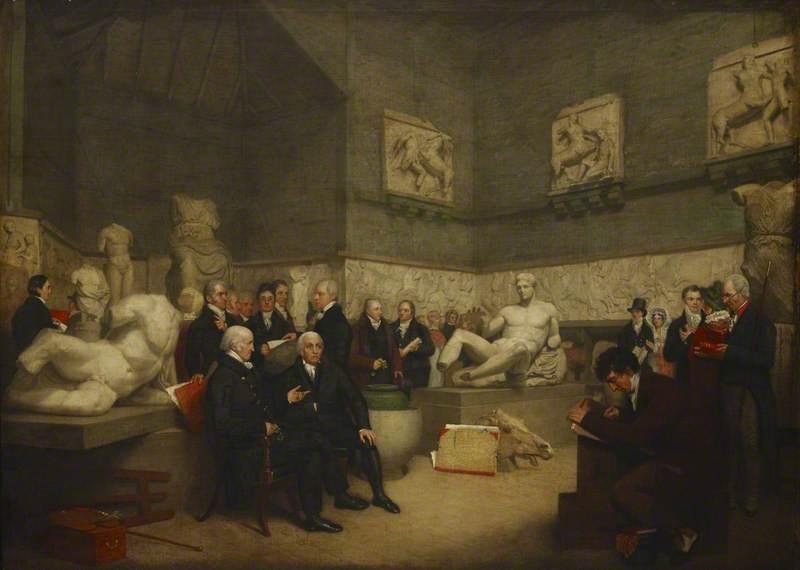
The Trustees in the Temporary Elgin Room, 1819, by Archibald Archer, depicts the Elgin Marbles at the British Museum surrounded by museum staff, a trustee, and visitors.

In 1810, Elgin published a defence of his actions, in which he argued that he had only decided to remove the marbles when he realised that they were not being cared for by Ottoman officials and were in danger of falling into the hands of Napoleon's army.

Felicia Hemans supported the purchase of the marbles and in her Modern Greece: A Poem (1817), defied Byron with the question:

And who may grieve that, rescued from their hands,
Spoilers of excellence and foes of art,
Thy relics, Athens! borne to other lands
Claim homage still to thee from every heart?

and quoted Haydon and other defenders of their accessibility in her notes.

Johann Wolfgang von Goethe thought the British government's decision to buy the marbles would herald "a new age of great art". The marbles went on public display in a temporary room of the British Museum in 1817 and soon broke attendance records for the museum. John Keats visited the British Museum in 1817, recording his feelings in the sonnet titled "On Seeing the Elgin Marbles". Some lines of his "Ode on a Grecian Urn" are also thought to have been inspired by his visit to the Elgin Marbles. William Wordsworth also viewed the marbles and commented favourably on their aesthetics in a letter to Haydon.

The marbles were later displayed in the specially constructed Elgin Saloon (1832) and became the preferred models for academic training in fine arts. Plaster casts of the marbles were in high demand and were distributed to museums, private collectors and heads of state throughout the world. They were moved to the Duveen Gallery, named after Joseph Duveen, 1st Baron Duveen, in 1939 where they continued to attract record attendances.

== Damage ==
=== Late antiquity and Byzantine era ===
Sometime after the Parthenon was converted to a Christian church in the 6th-century CE, the metopes of the north, west and east facades of the Parthenon were defaced by Christians in order to remove images of pagan deities. The damage was so extensive that the images on the affected metopes often can't be confidently identified.

=== Venetians ===
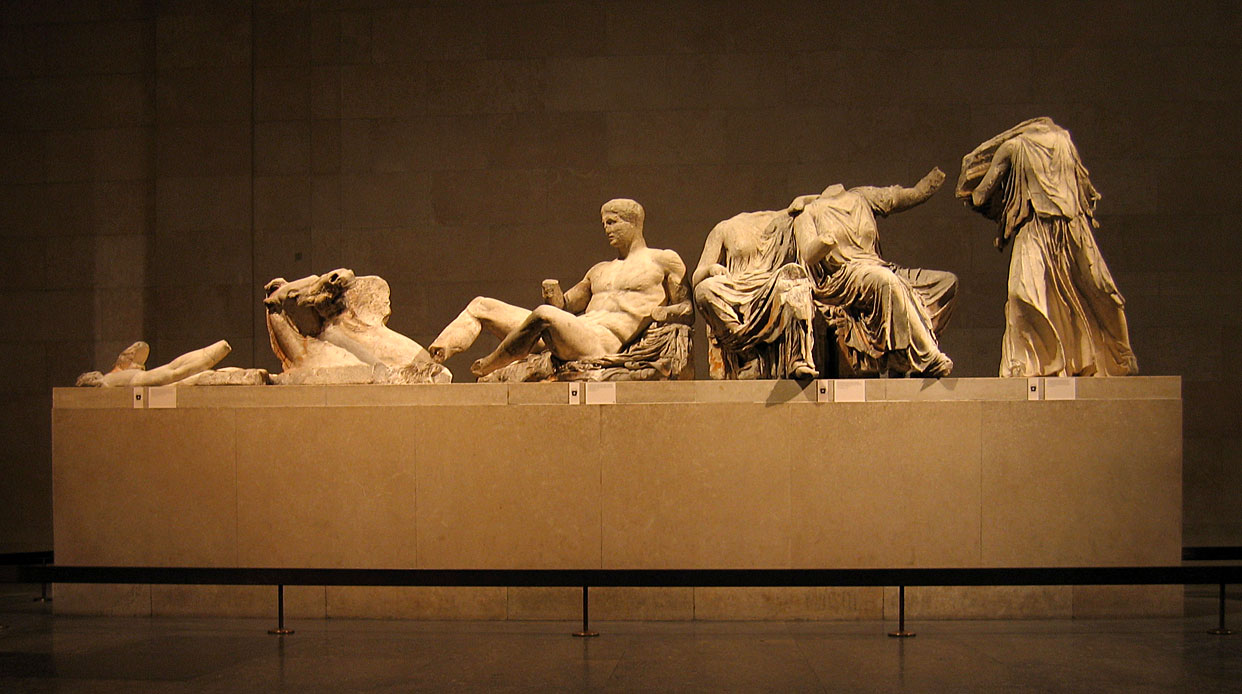
Statuary from the East Pediment

The Venetian bombardment of the Parthenon in 1687 seriously damaged the majority of sculptures, including some of those later removed by Elgin. Further damage to the Parthenon's artwork occurred when the Venetian general Francesco Morosini attempted to remove some of the larger sculptures. During the operation, a sculpture of Poseidon and two horses of Athena's chariot fell and broke into pieces. Several sculptures and fragments were removed by the Venetians.

=== Elgin ===
Elgin consulted with Italian sculptor Antonio Canova in 1803 about how best to restore the marbles. Canova was considered by some to be the world's best sculptural restorer of the time; Elgin wrote that Canova declined to work on the marbles for fear of damaging them further.

To facilitate transport by Elgin, the columns' capitals and many metopes and frieze slabs were either hacked off the main structure or sawn and sliced into smaller sections, causing irreparable damage to the Parthenon itself. One shipload of marbles on board the British brig Mentor was caught in a storm off Cape Matapan in southern Greece and sank near Kythera, but was salvaged at the Earl's personal expense; it took two years to bring them to the surface.

=== British Museum ===
Tools used to clean the marbles in 1937–38

The artefacts held in London suffered from 19th-century pollution which persisted until the mid-20th century and have suffered irreparable damage by previous cleaning methods employed by British Museum staff.

As early as 1838, scientist Michael Faraday was asked to provide a solution to the problem of the deteriorating surface of the marbles. The outcome is described in the following excerpt from the letter he sent to Henry Milman, a commissioner for the National Gallery.

The marbles generally were very dirty ... from a deposit of dust and soot. ... I found the body of the marble beneath the surface white. ... The application of water, applied by a sponge or soft cloth, removed the coarsest dirt. ... The use of fine, gritty powder, with the water and rubbing, though it more quickly removed the upper dirt, left much embedded in the cellular surface of the marble. I then applied alkalies, both carbonated and caustic; these quickened the loosening of the surface dirt ... but they fell far short of restoring the marble surface to its proper hue and state of cleanliness. I finally used dilute nitric acid, and even this failed. ... The examination has made me despair of the possibility of presenting the marbles in the British Museum in that state of purity and whiteness which they originally possessed.

A further effort to clean the marbles ensued in 1858. Richard Westmacott, who was appointed superintendent of the "moving and cleaning the sculptures" in 1857, in a letter approved by the British Museum Standing Committee on 13 March 1858 concluded

I think it my duty to say that some of the works are much damaged by ignorant or careless moulding – with oil and lard – and by restorations in wax and resin. These mistakes have caused discolouration. I shall endeavour to remedy this without, however, having recourse to any composition that can injure the surface of the marble.

Yet another effort to clean the marbles occurred in 1937–1938. This time the incentive was provided by the construction of a new Gallery to house the collection. The Pentelic marble mined from Mount Pentelicus north of Athens, from which the sculptures are made, naturally acquires a tan colour similar to honey when exposed to air; this colouring is often known as the marble's "patina" but Lord Duveen, who financed the whole undertaking, acting under the misconception that the marbles were originally white probably arranged for the team of masons working in the project to remove discolouration from some of the sculptures. The tools used were seven scrapers, one chisel and a piece of carborundum stone. They are now deposited in the British Museum's Department of Preservation. The cleaning process scraped away some of the detailed tone of many carvings. According to Harold Plenderleith, the surface removed in some places may have been as much as one-tenth of an inch (2.5 mm).

The British Museum responded by saying that "mistakes were made at that time." On another occasion, it was said that "the damage had been exaggerated for political reasons" and that "the Greeks were guilty of excessive cleaning of the marbles before they were brought to Britain." During the international symposium on the cleaning of the marbles, organised by the British Museum in 1999, curator Ian Jenkins, deputy keeper of Greek and Roman antiquities, remarked that "The British Museum is not infallible, it is not the Pope. Its history has been a series of good intentions marred by the occasional cock-up, and the 1930s cleaning was such a cock-up". Nonetheless, he said that the prime cause for the damage inflicted upon the marbles was the 2000-year-long weathering on the Acropolis.

In a newspaper article, American archaeologist Dorothy King wrote that techniques similar to those used in 1937–1938 were applied by Greeks as well in more recent decades than the British, and maintained that Italians still find them acceptable. The British Museum said that a similar cleaning of the Temple of Hephaestus in the Athenian Agora was carried out by the conservation team of the American School of Classical Studies at Athens in 1953 using steel chisels and brass wire. According to the Greek ministry of Culture, the cleaning was carefully limited to surface salt crusts. The 1953 American report concluded that the techniques applied were aimed at removing the black deposit formed by rain-water and "brought out the high technical quality of the carving" revealing at the same time "a few surviving particles of colour".

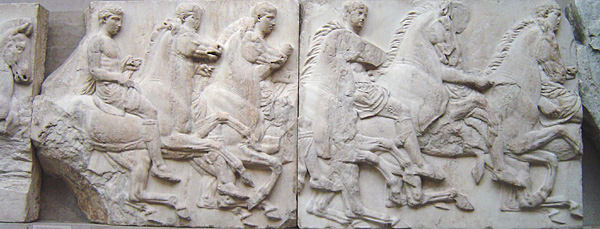
Section of a frieze from the Elgin Marbles

A 2023 study by Emma Payne concluded that the damage from the 1930s cleaning was minor and needed to be considered in the context of the time. Studies of the surface of the sculptures with archaeometric techniques, including Visible-Induced Luminescence (VIL), have revealed multiple traces of ancient polychromy on the sculptures, corroborating the idea that the cleaning damage was less extensive than previously thought.

Documents released by the British Museum under the Freedom of Information Act revealed that a series of minor accidents, thefts and acts of vandalism by visitors have inflicted further damage to the sculptures. This includes an incident in 1961 when two schoolboys knocked off a part of a centaur's leg, and in 1966 four shallow lines were scratched on the back of one of the figures by vandals. In 1970, letters were scratched on to the upper right thigh of another figure. Four years later, the dowel hole in a centaur's hoof was damaged by thieves trying to extract pieces of lead. In June 1981, a west pediment figure was slightly chipped by a falling glass skylight.

== Return controversy ==
=== Greek requests for return ===
In 1836, King Otto of the newly independent Greece formally asked the British government to return some of the Elgin Marbles (the four slabs of the frieze of the Temple of Athena Nike). In 1846, following a request from Greece, Britain sent a complete set of casts of the Parthenon frieze, and in 1890 the city of Athens unsuccessfully requested the return of the original frieze. In 1927, the Greek minister in London unsuccessfully asked for the return of some architectural fragments. In 1983, the Greek government formally asked the British government to return "all the sculptures which were removed from the Acropolis of Athens and are at present in the British Museum", and in 1984, it listed the dispute with UNESCO. In 2000, a select committee of the British parliament held an inquiry into the illegal trade in cultural property, which considered the dispute over the marbles. The committee heard evidence from the then Greek foreign minister, George Papandreou, who argued that the question of legal ownership was secondary to the ethical and cultural arguments for returning the sculptures. The committee, however, made no recommendations on the future of the marbles.

In 2000, the Greek government commissioned the construction of a new Acropolis Museum, which opened in 2009. The museum was, in part, designed to arrange the surviving Parthenon sculptures (including those in the Elgin collection) as they originally stood on the Parthenon itself, and to counter arguments that the Elgin Marbles would be better preserved and displayed in the British Museum. The Acropolis Museum displays a portion of the remaining frieze (about 30% has been lost or destroyed), placed in their original orientation and in sight of the Parthenon. The position of the elements held in London are clearly marked with white casts, and space is left where the sculptures no longer survive.

In 2013, the Greek government asked UNESCO to mediate between the Greek and British authorities on the return of the marbles, but the British government and the British Museum declined UNESCO's offer to mediate. In 2021, UNESCO concluded that the British government had an obligation to return the sculptures and called upon the United Kingdom to open negotiations with Greece.

In late 2022, British and Greek authorities resumed negotiations on the future of the marbles. Asked about the possible return of the Marbles, the British Culture Secretary, Michelle Donelan replied: "I can sympathise with some of the arguments but I do think that is a very dangerous and slippy road to embark down", expressing the worry that other cultural items now held in Britain might also have to be returned to the places they were acquired from.

In November 2023, Prime Minister Rishi Sunak cancelled a meeting with the Greek prime minister Kyriakos Mitsotakis over public comments Mitsotakis made regarding the marbles.

=== Rationale for returning to Athens ===
Those arguing for the marbles' return cite legal, moral, cultural, conservation and artistic grounds. Their arguments include:

- The marbles were obtained illegally, or at least unethically, and hence should be returned to their rightful owner.
- While the marbles are of universal cultural value, they are also part of the unique cultural heritage of Greece, and this is the most fitting location for them to be displayed.
- The Parthenon sculptures around the world should be reunited in order to restore "organic elements" which "at present remain without cohesion, homogeneity and historicity of the monument to which they belong" and allow visitors to better appreciate them as a whole.
- Presenting all the extant Parthenon Marbles near their original historical and cultural environment, and in the context of other Greek antiquities, would permit their "fuller understanding and interpretation".
- Safekeeping of the marbles would be ensured at the Acropolis Museum, as it is equipped with state-of-the-art technology for the protection and preservation of exhibits.
- The Elgin Marbles have suffered significant damage from poor conservation and accidents in London and it cannot be assumed they will be better preserved there.
- Returning the Parthenon sculptures would not set a precedent for other restitution claims because of the distinctively "universal value" of the Parthenon.

=== Rationale for remaining in London ===
A range of arguments has been presented by scholars, British political leaders and the British Museum for the retention of the Elgin Marbles in London. These include the following:

- Elgin acquired the marbles legally and no court of law would find in favour of a Greek complainant.
- Elgin rescued the marbles from destruction and those in the British Museum are in better condition than those left behind. The British Museum has a right to retain and publicly display what it preserved from destruction.
- Bringing the Parthenon sculptures together as a unified whole is impossible as half had been lost or destroyed by 1800.
- The British Museum display allows the marbles to be better viewed in the context of other major ancient cultures and thus complements the perspective provided by the Acropolis Museum collection.
- Fulfilling all restitution claims would empty most of the world's great museums – this has also caused concerns among other European and American museums, with one potential target being the Nefertiti Bust in Berlin's Neues Museum; in addition, portions of Parthenon marbles are kept by many other European museums.
- The British Museum receives about 6 million visitors per year as opposed to 1.5 million visitors to the Acropolis Museum. The removal of the marbles to Greece would significantly reduce the number of people who have the opportunity to visit the marbles.
- The Elgin Marbles have been on public display in England since 1807 and in that time have become a part of the British cultural heritage.

=== Public campaigns for return ===
Outside Greece, a campaign for the return of the marbles began in 1981 with the formation of the International Organising Committee – Australia – for the Restitution of the Parthenon Marbles, and in 1983, with the formation of the British Committee for the Reunification of the Parthenon Marbles. Campaign organisations also exist in Greece and around the world.

A number of British and international celebrities, such as comedian Stephen Fry and actors Liam Neeson and George Clooney, have expressed their support for the return of the marbles.

=== Opinion polls ===
An Ipsos MORI poll of British voters in 1998, found 39% in favour of returning the marbles to Greece and 15% in favour of keeping them in Britain; 45% had no opinion or would not vote if the question were put to a referendum. Another Mori poll in 2002 showed similar results. A YouGov poll in 2021 found that 59% of British respondents thought the Parthenon marbles belonged in Greece, 18% that they belonged in Britain, and 18% did not know.

As of 2014, only one scientific poll of the Greek public has been conducted. The poll by Ipsos Greece in 2014 found that 93% of respondents thought the reunification of the marbles in Greece was "very important" or "a matter of national importance". Political scientist Ilias Nicolacopoulos stated that a probable reason for the lack of polling was that "we considered that public opinion in Greece would obviously adopt a clear, unanimous stance."

=== British press ===
The Guardian published an editorial in 2020 reiterating its support for the return of the Parthenon marbles. In January 2022, The Times reversed its long-standing support for retaining the marbles, publishing an editorial calling for their return to Greece. The Daily Telegraph published an editorial in January 2023 arguing that any decision on the return of the Elgin Marbles to Greece should be made by the British parliament.

=== British Museum Act 1963 ===
The British Museum Act 1963 is an Act of the Parliament of the United Kingdom which forbids the British Museum from disposing of its holdings, except in a small number of special circumstances. Any change to the Act would have to be passed by Parliament.

=== Public debate in Greece ===
In September 2025, the Greek non-profit organisation Debate House hosted a public debate between four archaeologists and lawyers, two of which argued for the return of the marbles and two for their retention in the British Museum. One of the debate's organisers, Philippos Petropoulos, stated that it is rare for arguments for the retention of the marbles in Britain to be publicly expressed and debated in Greece.

== Loans and copies ==
The British Museum has made plaster casts of the marbles and distributed them to many museums around the world. In 2022, The Institute for Digital Archaeology (IDA) in Oxford asked the British Museum to scan its marbles from the Parthenon in order to make robot-carved marble replicas. The museum, however, declined the request and the Greek government declined to comment on the project.

The British Museum lent the figure of a river-god, possibly the river Ilisus, to the Hermitage Museum in Saint Petersburg to celebrate its 250th anniversary. It was on display there from 6 December 2014 until 18 January 2015. This was the first time the British Museum had lent part of its Parthenon Marbles collection and it caused some controversy. The British Museum states that it is open to lending its marbles from the Parthenon to Greece but the Greek government does not wish to agree to the standard clause acknowledging the British Museum's ownership of any loan items.

In November 2026, the British Museum lent two fragments of the East Pediment to the Liebieghaus Gallery in Frankfurt for an exhibition on a reconstruction of the original composition. The gallery requested seven pieces from Greece, but the request was declined, reportedly because of the presence of the pieces from London.

== See also ==
- Pedimental sculpture
- Palermo Fragment
- Greece–United Kingdom relations
- Las Incantadas, portico taken from Thessaloniki
- Saint Demetra, sculpture taken from Eleusis

== Sources ==
- Beard, Mary (2010). The Parthenon (2nd ed.). Profile Books. ISBN 978-1-84668-349-7.
- Herman, Alexander (2023). The Parthenon Marbles Dispute. London: Bloomsbury. ISBN 978-1509967179.
- Jenkins, Tiffany (2016). Keeping Their Marbles: How the Treasures of the Past Ended Up in Museums ... and Why They Should Stay There. Oxford: Oxford University Press. ISBN 978-0-19-965759-9.
- St Clair, William (1998). Lord Elgin and the Marbles (4th ed.). Oxford: Oxford University Press. ISBN 0-19-288053-5.
- Titi, Catharine (2023). The Parthenon Marbles and International Law. Springer. ISBN 978-3-031-26356-9.
- Williams, Dyfri (7 January 2009). "Lord Elgin's firman". Journal of the History of Collections. 21 (1): 49–76. doi:10.1093/jhc/fhn033.
