= Elgin clock tower =

Elgin Clock Tower
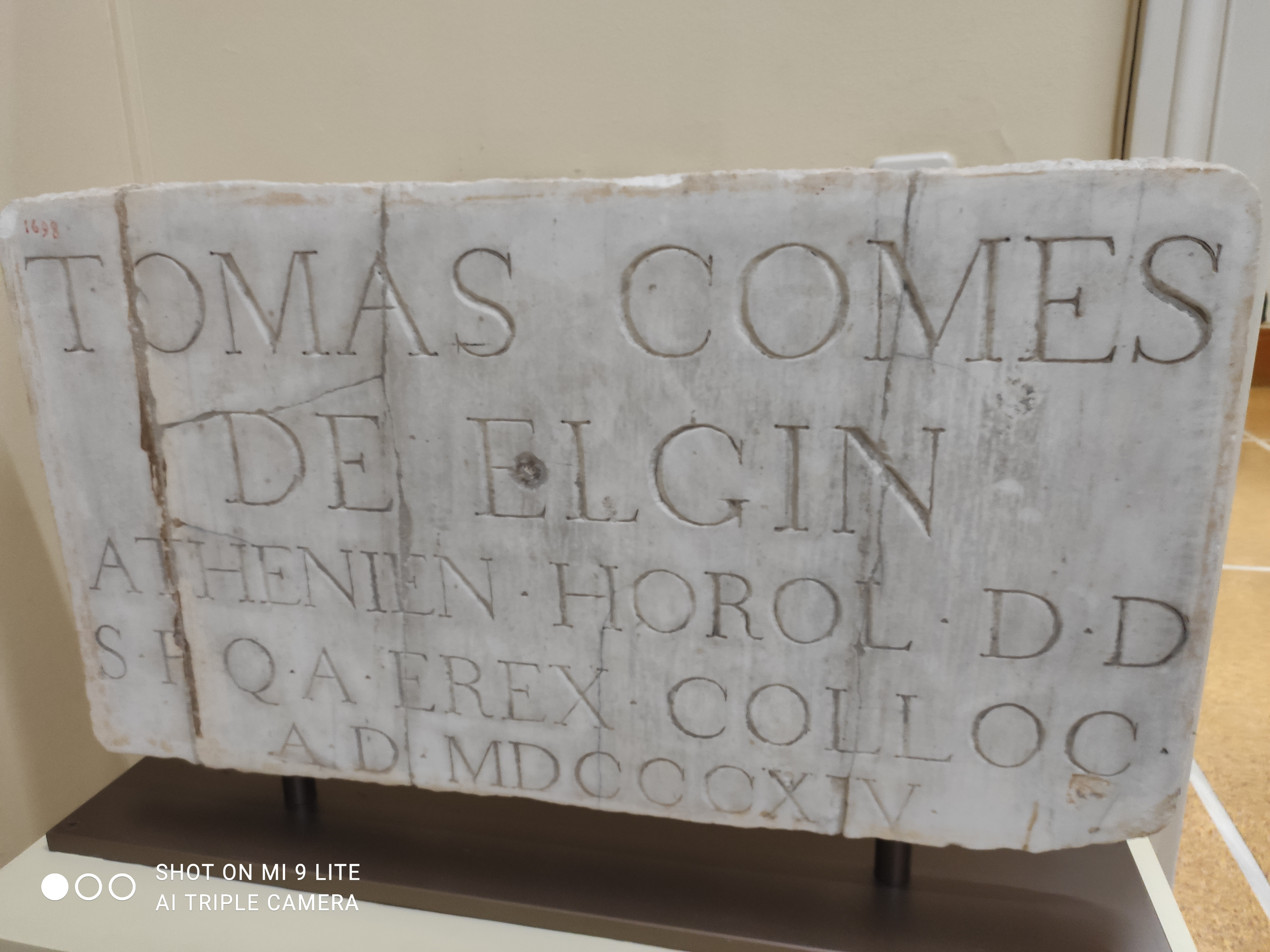
- Inscription relating to Lord Elgin’s clock, now in the collection of the National Historical Museum, Athens

General information
- Status: Destroyed
- Type: Clock tower
- Location: Athens, Greece, Roman Agora
- Completed: 1814
- Owner: Municipality of Athens

Design and construction
- Known for: First public mechanical clock in Athens

The Clock Tower of Elgin was a public clock tower erected in Athens between 1811 and 1814. The clock was donated by Thomas Bruce, 7th Earl of Elgin and ordered in 1806, but the tower was built and paid for by the city. It stood in the area of the Roman Agora of Athens near the Library of Hadrian and was the first mechanical public clock in the city. The tower was destroyed in a fire in 1884, and only fragments of the clock mechanism and inscriptions survive.

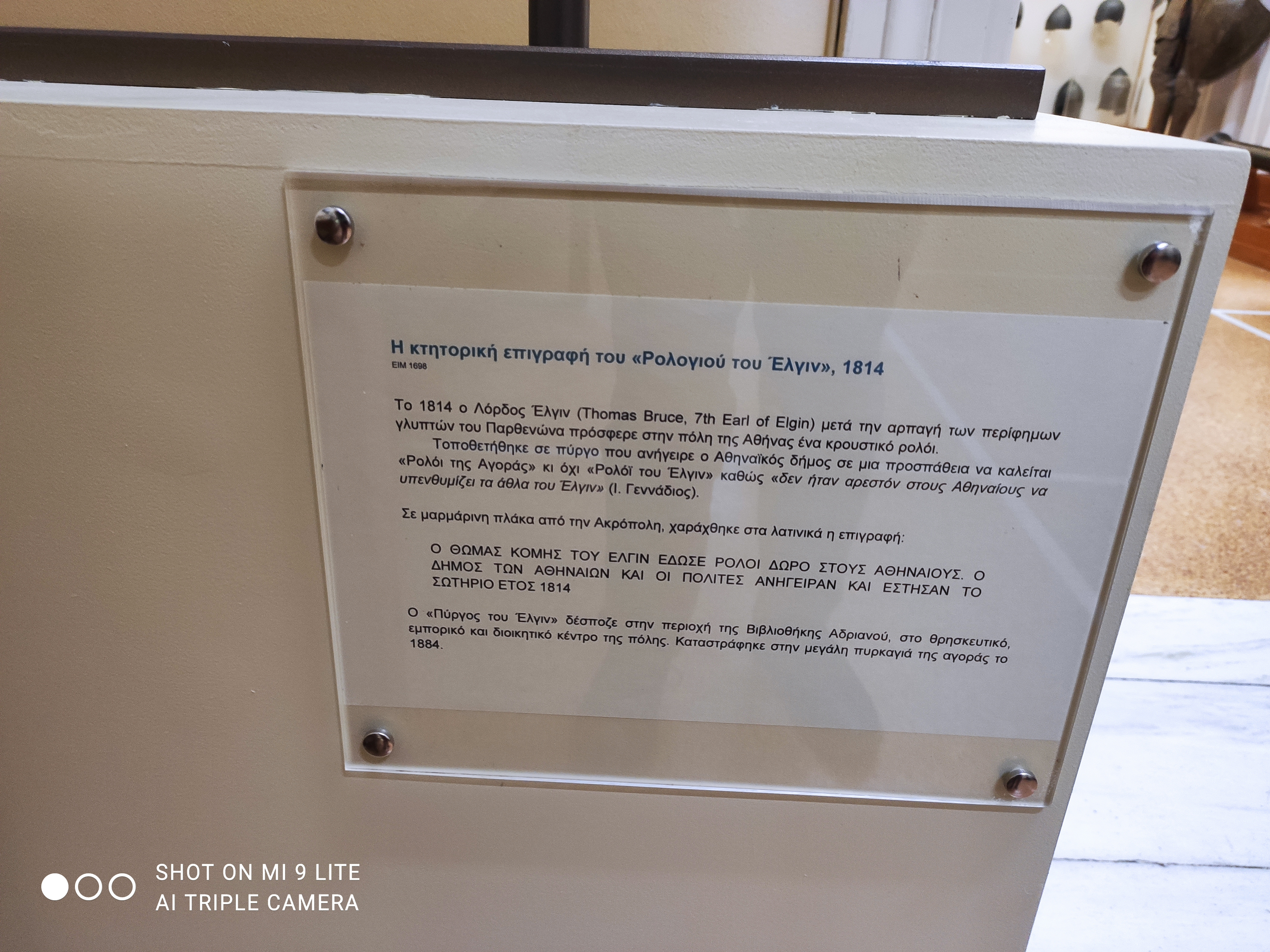
Museum label reading - In 1814, Lord Elgin (Thomas Bruce, 7th Earl of Elgin), after the looting of the famous sculptures of the Parthenon, offered the city of Athens a striking clock. It was placed in the tower erected by the Municipality of Athens, in an effort for it to be called the “Clock of the Market” and not the “Clock of Elgin”, since it was not pleasing to Athenians to be reminded of Elgin's other actions (I. Gennadios). On a marble slab from the Acropolis, the following inscription was engraved in Latin: Thomas, Count of Elgin, gave a clock as a gift to the Athenians. The Municipality of Athens and the citizens erected and set up the tower in the year 1814. The “Tower of Elgin” dominated the area of the Library of Hadrian, in the religious, commercial and administrative center of the city. It was destroyed in the great fire of the market in 1884.
