= Giovanni Battista Lusieri =

Italian painter (1755–1821)

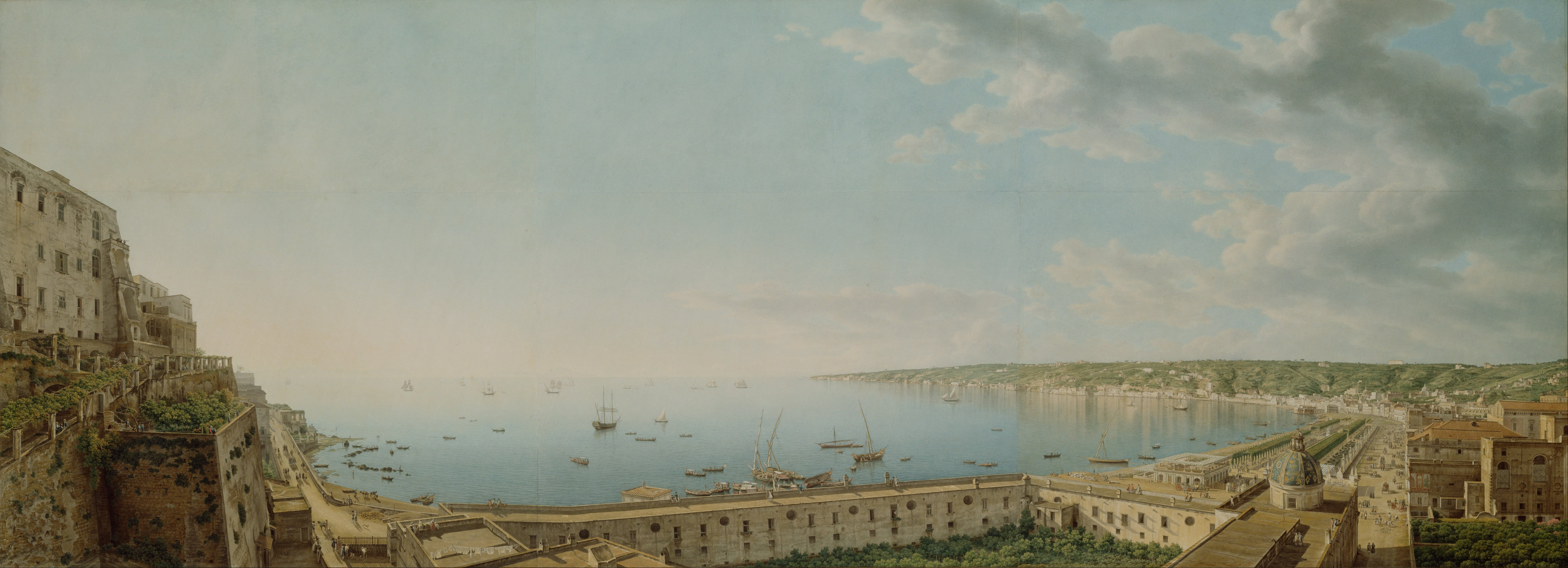
- View of the Bay of Naples, ca. 1791
- Born: 1755; Rome, Papal States
- Died: 1821 (aged 65–66); Athens, Ottoman Empire
- Known for: Elgin Marbles

Giovanni Battista Lusieri (1755–1821) was an Italian landscape painter from Naples. He was court painter to Ferdinand I of the Two Sicilies before working for Thomas Bruce, 7th Earl of Elgin and becoming involved in the removal and shipping of the Elgin Marbles to England.

== Biography ==
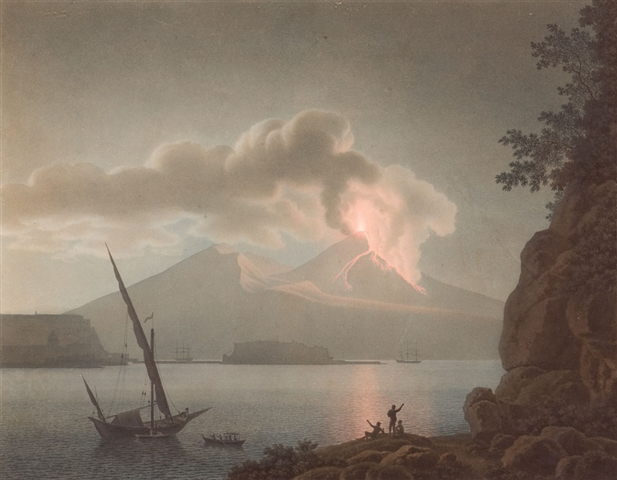
Eruption on Vesuvius by night, 1793

According to the Netherlands Institute for Art History (RKD), Lusieri travelled in Naples, Greece, and Turkey. He was employed by Lord Elgin, to make drawings of the Acropolis. He is known today for removing and shipping the Elgin Marbles to London.

Lusieri believed that he might have been more famous as an artist had he not spent so much time working for Lord Elgin and his antiquity collection. He had originally been known for the accurate landscapes and studies of buildings in Italy and Sicily that he often sold to young gentlemen on their Grand Tour, especially after he moved to Naples in 1782 and concentrated on views of Mount Vesuvius. These paintings sold well because the volcano was then quite active. Lord Byron regarded him as an important Italian artist, although he may have been biased as he was also the good friend of Lusieri's brother-in-law, Nicolo Giraud. Lusieri painted his landscapes in accurate detail, and resisted the fashion for imaginative constructions imitating Claude Lorrain, arguing that paintings should be taken from real life. From 1799 he spent his time working for Lord Elgin in Greece, and less time painting.

== Elgin Marbles ==
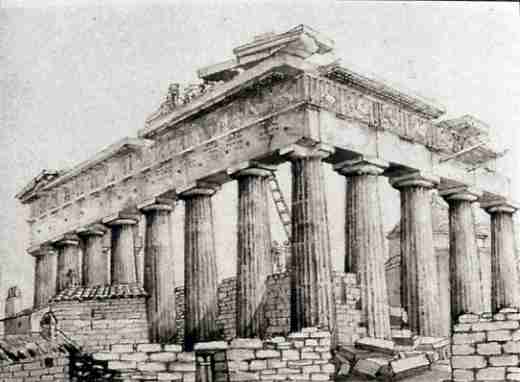
Lusieri's scaffolding during deconstruction of the Parthenon

Lusieri was employed by Lord and Lady Elgin even though he was not able to speak English. The contract was drawn up between them in French, and Lusieri was to be paid £200 per year. Lusieri had been the Court Painter to the King of Naples and Elgin's secretary, William Hamilton, had written to the King to ask permission to employ his painter. Lusieri was originally employed to create sketches for Elgin of Greek antiquities. Lusieri was empowered to also employ moulders who were to create casts of Greek sculptures. Elgin however found that marble sculptures were missing and that they had allegedly been destroyed. It was Lusieri who persuaded the reluctant Elgin to remove the sculptures in order to protect them from local Turkish opportunists, who were breaking off bits to sell to tourists. In 1801 Elgin had Lusieri supervise the removal of the sculptures at a cost of £70,000.

== Legacy ==
Lusieri's body of work was seriously reduced when many of his paintings were lost in a shipwreck in 1828.

A considerable number of his extant paintings are in the possession of the Elgin family. These paintings and others were in Lusieri's very first exhibition, at the Scottish National Gallery in 2012.
