= Thomas Bruce, 7th Earl of Elgin =

British nobleman and diplomat (1766–1841)

Lieutenant-General The Right Honourable The Earl of Elgin PC FSA Scot
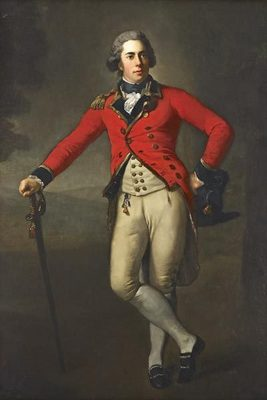
- Portrait of Lord Elgin, c. 1788

British Ambassador to the Ottoman Empire
- In office 1799–1803
- Monarch: George III
- Preceded by: Francis Jackson
- Succeeded by: William Drummond

Personal details
- Born: 20 July 1766 Broomhall, Fife, Scotland
- Died: 14 November 1841 (aged 75) Paris, France
- Spouse(s): Mary Nisbet (m. 1799); Elizabeth Oswald (m. 1810)
- Children: 11, including James, Robert, Thomas, and Augusta
- Parent(s): Charles Bruce, 5th Earl of Elgin; Martha Whyte
- Known for: The controversial procurement of marble sculptures from the Parthenon, Acropolis of Athens

Thomas Bruce, 7th Earl of Elgin and 11th Earl of Kincardine (/ˈɛlɡɪn/ ELG-in; 20 July 1766 – 14 November 1841), often known as Lord Elgin, was a Scottish nobleman, diplomat, and collector, known primarily for the controversial procurement of marble sculptures (known as the Elgin Marbles) from the Parthenon and other structures on the Acropolis of Athens.

== Early life ==
A member of the formerly royal house of Bruce, Elgin was born at the family seat, Broomhall House, near Dunfermline, Fife. He was the second son of Charles Bruce, 5th Earl of Elgin and his wife Martha Whyte, governess to Princess Charlotte of Wales. He succeeded his older brother William Robert Bruce, the 6th Earl, in 1771 when he was only five.

He was educated at Harrow and Westminster. After several years at St Andrews, he proceeded to the Continent where he completed his studies at Paris.

== Career ==
=== Military career ===
Elgin entered the army as an ensign in the Scots Guards in 1785. He transferred to 65th Foot in 1789, as captain of a company, by purchase. In 1793, he was appointed to the staff as a major of foot by brevet, holding the rank on the Continent only. In 1795, he transferred to 12th Regiment of Foot as a major. Later in 1795, he raised a regiment of Fencible Infantry and was appointed its colonel, with the permanent rank of lieutenant colonel in the Army. He was promoted to colonel in the Army in 1802, to major general in 1809, to lieutenant general in 1814, and general in 1837.

=== Public life ===
Elgin was elected as a Scottish representative peer in 1790. In 1799, he was appointed to the Privy Council. He attended Parliament whenever his other duties allowed until he lost his seat in 1807. Re-elected to Parliament in 1820 as one of the 16 representative Scottish Peers, he remained a member of the House of Lords until he died in 1841.

He held the office of Lord Lieutenant of Fife.

=== Diplomatic career ===
In 1791, he was sent as a temporary envoy-extraordinary to Austria, while Sir Robert Keith was ill. He was then sent as envoy-extraordinary in Brussels from 1792 until the conquest of the Austrian Netherlands by France. After spending time in Britain, he was sent as envoy-extraordinary to Prussia in 1795.

Elgin was appointed as ambassador to the Ottoman Empire in December 1798. On 11 March 1799, shortly before setting off for Constantinople, Elgin married Mary, daughter and heiress of William Hamilton Nisbet, of Dirleton. Elgin arrived at Constantinople on 6 November 1799. As ambassador to the Sublime Porte he showed considerable skill and energy in fulfilling a difficult mission, the extension of British influence during the conflict between the Ottoman Empire and France. The Treaty of Amiens was signed by Britain and France in March 1802. His embassy at an end, Elgin departed Constantinople on 16 January 1803.

== Elgin Marbles ==
Following discussions with the diplomat and archaeologist Sir William Hamilton, Elgin decided he would engage, at his own expense, a team of artists and architects to produce plaster casts and detailed drawings of ancient Greek buildings, sculptures and artefacts. In this way he hoped to make his embassy, "beneficial to the progress of the Fine Arts in Great Britain."

Elgin procured the services of a Neapolitan painter, Lusieri, and of several skilful draughtsmen and modellers. These artists were dispatched to Athens in the summer of 1800, and were principally employed in making drawings of the ancient monuments. Elgin stated that about the middle of the summer of 1801, he had received a firman from the Sublime Porte which allowed his agents not only to "fix scaffolding round the ancient Temple of the Idols [the Parthenon], and to mould the ornamental sculpture and visible figures thereon in plaster and gypsum," but also "to take away any pieces of stone with old inscriptions or figures thereon". The document exists in an Italian translation made by the British Embassy in Constantinople and now held by the British Museum, but no official copy of it has yet been found in the Turkish government archives from the imperial era. There is debate over the legal status of the document.

The actual procurement of ancient marbles from Athens formed no part of Elgin's first plan. The decision to remove marbles attached to structures was made on the spot by Philip Hunt, Elgin's chaplain and one of his representatives in Athens. Elgin's agents removed about half of the Parthenon frieze, fifteen metopes, and seventeen pedimental sculpture fragments, in addition to a caryatid and a column from the Erechtheion, sculptured slabs from the Athenian temple of Nike Apteros, and various antiquities from Attica and other districts of Hellas.

Part of the Elgin collection was prepared for embarkation for Britain in 1803, and considerable difficulties were encountered at every stage of its transit. Elgin's vessel, the Mentor, was wrecked near Cerigo with its cargo of marbles, and it was not till after the labours of three years, and the expenditure of a large sum of money, that the marbles were successfully recovered by the divers. On Elgin's departure from the Ottoman Empire in 1803, he withdrew all his artists from Athens with the exception of Lusieri, who remained to direct the excavations, which were still carried on, though on a much reduced scale. Additions continued to be made to the Elgin collections, and as late as 1812, eighty fresh cases of antiquities arrived in England.

Elgin's procurement of the marbles was supported by some, including Goethe, and censured by others in Britain as vandalism, most famously Lord Byron, who wrote the following lines

Dull is the eye that will not weep to see
Thy walls defaced, thy mouldering shrines removed
By British hands, which it had best behoved
To guard those relics ne'er to be restored.
Curst be the hour when from their isle they roved,
And once again thy hapless bosom gored,
And snatch'd thy shrinking gods to northern climes abhorred!

Elgin defended his actions in a pamphlet Memorandum on the Subject of the Earl of Elgin's Pursuits in Greece, published in 1810. On the recommendation of a British parliamentary select committee, the marbles were purchased by the British government in 1816 for £35,000, considerably below their cost to Elgin (estimated at £75,000), (Note: Elgin also donated a town clock to Athens.) and transferred in trust to the British Museum, where they went on display in 1817.

Britain's ownership of the Elgin Marbles is disputed by Greece. Discussions between UK and Greek officials about the future of the marbles are ongoing.

== Detention in France ==
After leaving Constantinople, the Elgins decided to return to Britain via Italy and France. When, on 18 May 1803, war again broke out between Britain and France, they were in Lyon. Elgin was declared a prisoner of war and was released on parole on condition that he not leave France. In November, Elgin was imprisoned in the fortress of Lourdes and the French offered to release him in exchange for a French general in detention in England. The British refused, and Elgin was again released on parole. In October 1805, the French gave Lady Elgin, who was pregnant, permission to return to England on compassionate grounds. Elgin himself was finally allowed to leave France in June 1806 following a direct appeal to Napoleon by British Prime Minister Lord Grenville. As a condition of his release, Elgin agreed to return to France whenever the French government demanded.

== Return to Britain and later life ==
Soon after returning to Britain, Elgin discovered that his wife was having an affair with Robert Ferguson, one of his oldest friends. In December 1807, Elgin successfully sued Ferguson for seduction in the English courts and was awarded £10,000 in damages. In March 1808, he brought a successful divorce action in Edinburgh against his wife on grounds of adultery. The marriage was formally dissolved by a private act of Parliament. The court cases were widely reported and caused considerable public scandal.

In 1807, Elgin lost his seat in the House of Lords, and the resumption of a military or diplomatic career was ruled out by the terms of his parole in France, which Elgin felt honour bound to observe while Napoleon was in power. Elgin was deeply in debt due to the costs associated with his embassy, his procurement of the Elgin marbles, and his court actions. He virtually retired from public life.

In September 1810, Elgin married Elizabeth Oswald of Dunnikier. That year, he offered his collection of antiquities for sale to the government, but withdrew when he was offered only £30,000.

During 1815 Elgin became embroiled in the Tweddell remains affair, a controversy over the possessions of John Tweddell, a classical scholar who had died in 1799 in Athens. Elgin was accused of having appropriated some of Tweddell's papers after his death, during his term as British ambassador in Constantinople. Some of Tweddell's papers had been destroyed in a fire and others lost at sea. The remaining papers were misplaced when Elgin arranged for them to be sent back to England. The matter was settled in late 1816 with the return of some of the items to Tweddell's family.

In 1820, Elgin was again elected to the House of Lords, but his requests for a peerage were unsuccessful. He eventually moved to France to escape his creditors and died in Paris on 14 November 1841. His widow, the Dowager Countess of Elgin, died in Paris 1 April 1860.

== Family ==
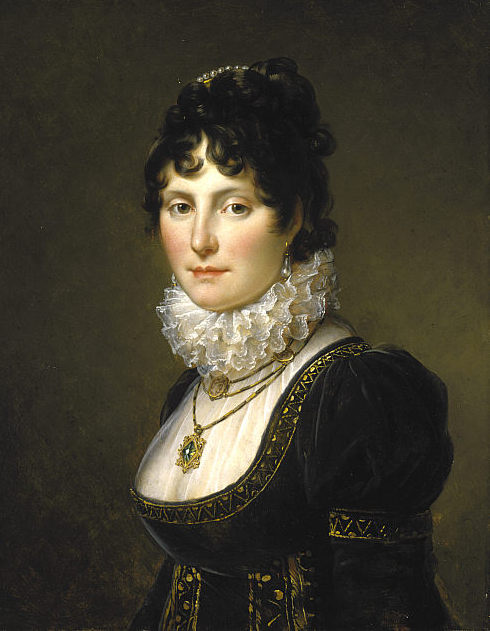
Portrait of Mary, Countess of Elgin by François Gérard, 1803

Lord Elgin married twice. On 11 March 1799, he married Mary Nisbet, the only child of William Hamilton Nisbet, of Dirleton. They had a son and three daughters:

- George Charles Constantine Bruce, Lord Bruce (5 April 1800 – 1840)
- Lady Mary Bruce (28 August 1801 – 21 December 1883)
- Lady Matilda Harriet Bruce (1802 – 31 August 1857), married Sir John Maxwell, 8th Baronet
- Hon. William Nisbet Hamilton Bruce (4 March 1804 – 20 April 1805), died in infancy
- Lady Lucy Bruce (21 January 1806 – 4 September 1881)

Elgin divorced his wife in 1808 for adultery with Robert Ferguson, whom she immediately married..

On 21 September 1810, Elgin married Elizabeth Oswald (1790–1860), the youngest daughter of James Townsend Oswald of Dunnikier. They had four sons and three daughters:

- James Bruce, 8th Earl of Elgin (20 July 1811 – 20 November 1863), Governor-General of Canada and Viceroy of India.
- Robert Bruce (15 March 1813 – 27 June 1862), lieutenant-colonel in the Grenadier Guards.
- Sir Frederick Wright-Bruce (14 April 1814 – 19 September 1867), barrister and diplomat.
- Lady Charlotte Christian Bruce (9 September 1817 – 27 April 1872).
- Lady Augusta Frederica Elizabeth Bruce (3 April 1822 – 1 March 1876), Lady-in-Waiting to the Duchess of Kent and Resident Bedchamber Woman to Queen Victoria.
- Thomas Charles Bruce (15 February 1825 – 23 November 1890), MP for Portsmouth.
- Lady Frances Anne Bruce (4 October 1828 – 16 August 1894), Lady-in-Waiting to the Duchess of Edinburgh.

One of his granddaughters, Mary Grant, was a renowned sculptor.

== See also ==
- Francesco Morosini
- Palermo Fragment
- Pera House
- Las Incantadas, sculptures taken from Greece often called "the Elgins of Thessaloniki"
- Saint Demetra, a caryatid taken from Eleusis around the same period
- Winged Victory of Samothrace, sculpture claimed by Greece
- Bassae Frieze, temple sculptures from Bassae in the British Museum

== Sources ==
- Burke, John Bernard (1852). A genealogical and heraldic dictionary of the peerage and baronetage of the British Empire (14 ed.). Colburn. p. 364.
- "NECROLOGY". The Courier (Hobart, Tas. : 1840 – 1859). Hobart, Tas.: National Library of Australia. 14 May 1841. p. 4.
- Lang, Cecil Y. (1987). Lang, Cecil Y.; Shannon, Edgar F. Jr. (eds.). The Letters of Alfred Lord Tennyson: 1851–1870. Vol. 2. Harvard University Press. p. 350. ISBN 978-0-674-52584-9.
- Urban, Sylvanus, ed. (January 1841). "Obituary: Lord Bruce". The Gentleman's magazine. Vol. 170. J.B. Nicolas and Son. p. 106.
- St Clair, William (1998). Lord Elgin and the Marbles (4th ed.). Oxford: Oxford University Press. ISBN 0-19-288053-5.
- St Clair, William (January 2008) [2004]. "Bruce, Thomas, seventh earl of Elgin and eleventh earl of Kincardine (1766–1841)". Oxford Dictionary of National Biography. Oxford University Press.

Attribution

- This article incorporates text from a publication now in the public domain: Wroth, Warwick William (1886). "Bruce, Thomas (1766-1841)". In Stephen, Leslie (ed.). Dictionary of National Biography. Vol. 7. London: Smith, Elder & Co. pp. 130–131.

Diplomatic posts
Preceded by Viscount Torrington	British Minister in Brussels; 1792–1794	French Conquest
Preceded by Lord Henry Spencer	British Minister to Prussia; 1795–1799	Succeeded by The Earl of Carysfort
Preceded by Francis Jackson	British Ambassador to the Ottoman Empire; 1799–1803	Succeeded by William Drummond
Honorary titles
Preceded by The 22nd Earl of Crawford	Lord Lieutenant of Fife; 1807	Succeeded by The 22nd Earl of Crawford
Peerage of Scotland
Preceded by William Bruce	Earl of Elgin; Earl of Kincardine; 1771–1841	Succeeded by James Bruce
