= Mentor (brig) =

British merchant ship (sunk 1802)

Coordinates: 36°13′19″N 23°04′56″E

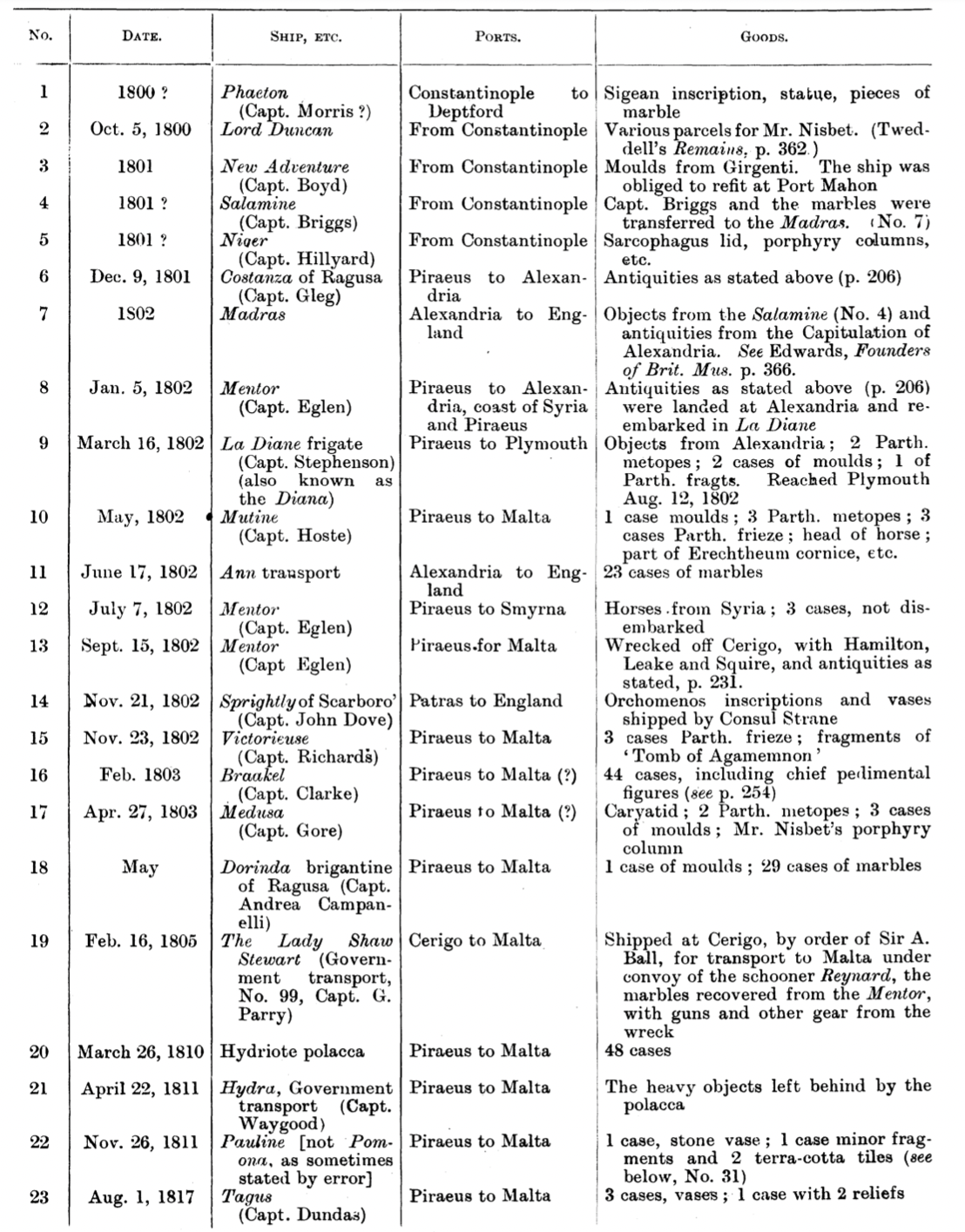
List of transportation of the Elgin Marbles. The Mentor made three such journeys in 1802.

The Mentor was a brig bought by Thomas Bruce, 7th Earl of Elgin, in order to transport antiquities from Athens. The cargo included a significant number of sculptures from the Parthenon.

== Cargo ==
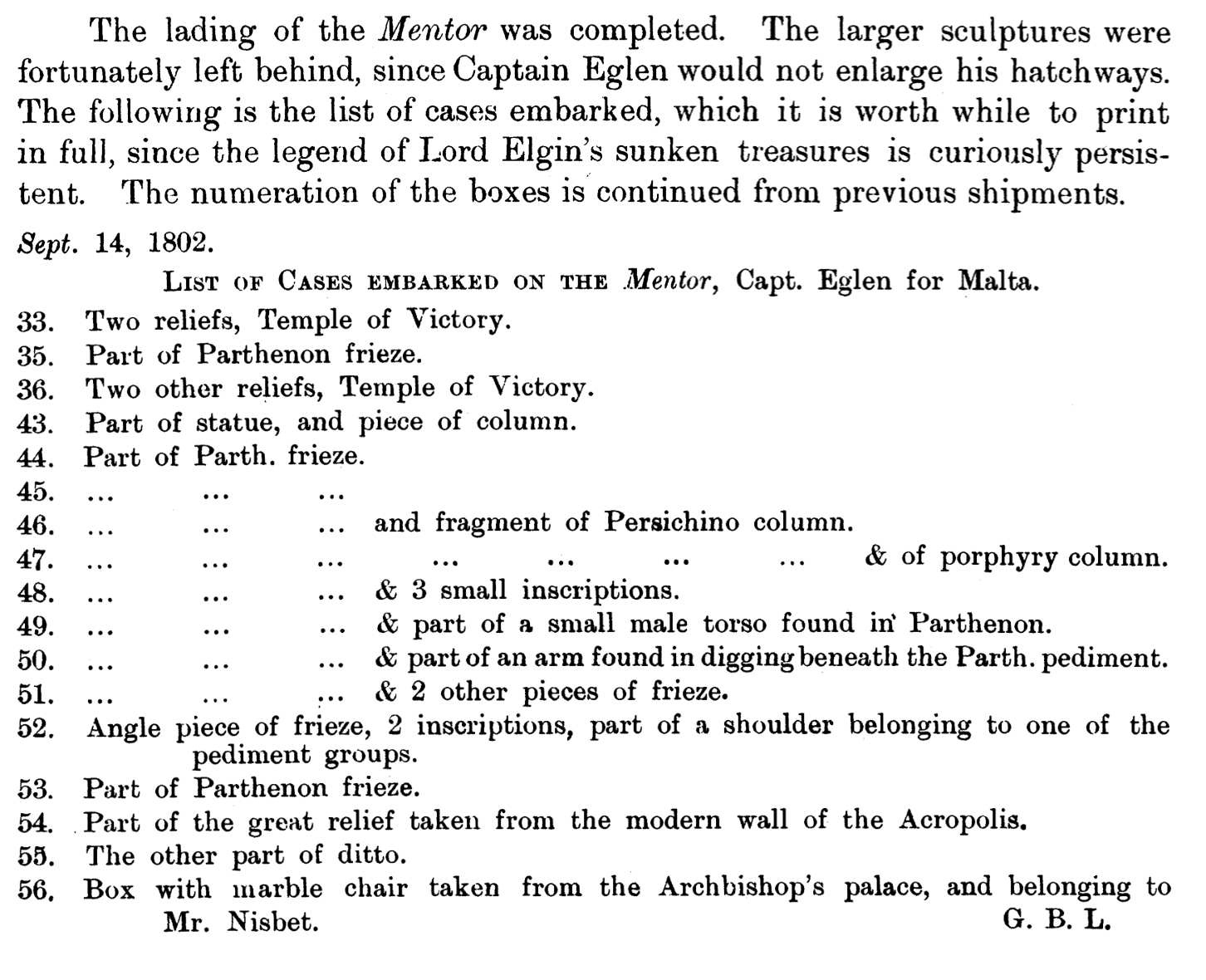
List of Elgin Marbles on the Mentor brig

Commanded by Captain William Eglen, it left Piraeus on 18 September 1802 with seventeen cases full of antiquities, including:

- 14 pieces of the Parthenon Frieze
- 4 pieces of the frieze of the temple known as Athena Nike on the Acropolis
- a marble throne

== Sinking ==
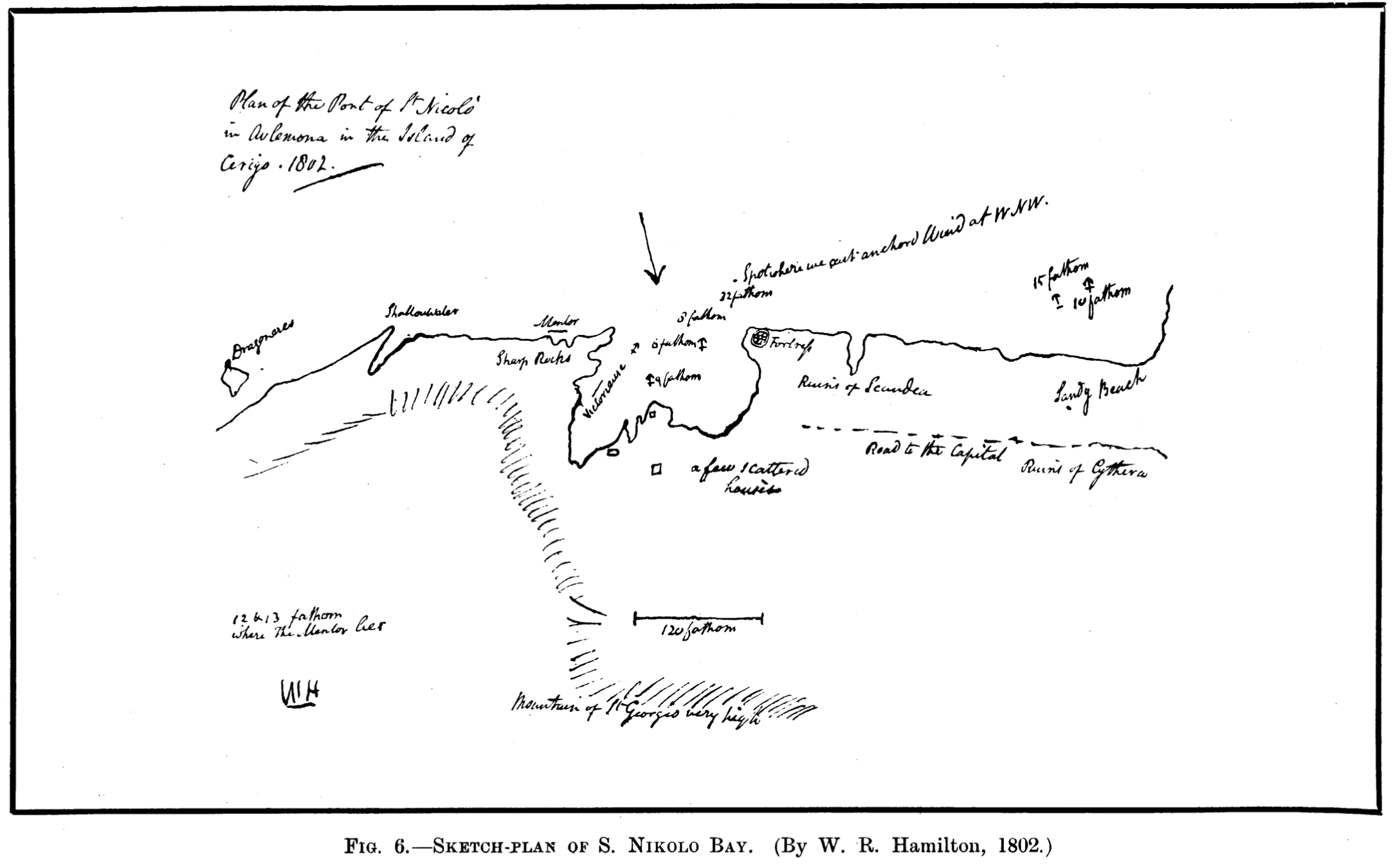
Diagram of the sinking

The ship sailed a longer route than to pick up additional cargo. Having spent the night at Cape Matapan, the ship departed during strong easterly winds, and aimed to anchor at Kythira, but the bad weather meant it could not dock at the small port of Avlemonas and it swung onto the rocks. The crew and passengers were saved by a nearby boat, but the Mentor and its cargo sank to a depth of 23 meters. In the two years following the shipwreck, with the help of local divers, most of the antiquities were recovered.

== Recovery attempts ==
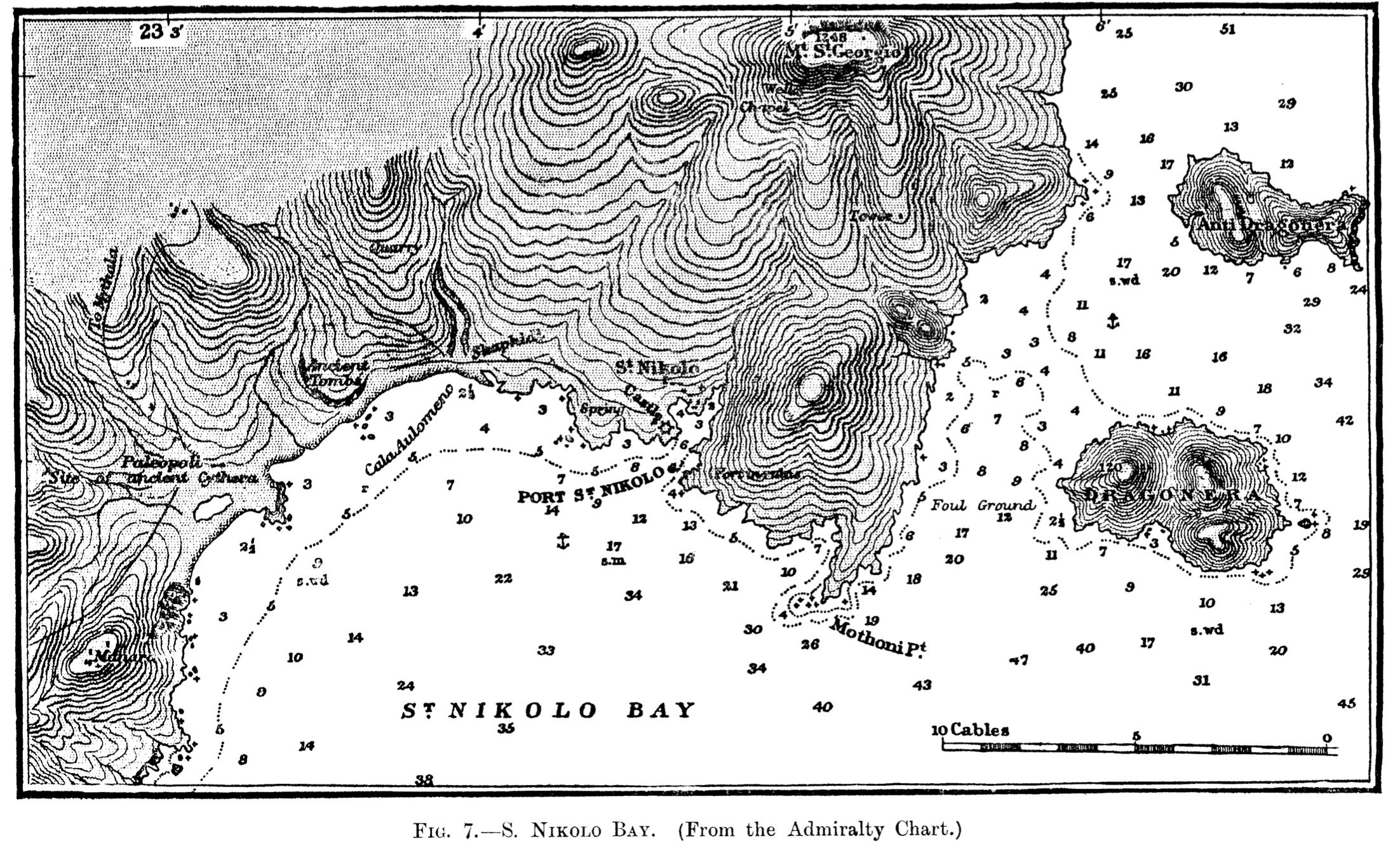
Nautical diagram of the area

Between 2011 and 2016, divers organized by the Greek Ephorate of Underwater Antiquities uncovered some of the sunken antiquities.
