= William St Clair =

British historian (1937–2021)

- Born: 7 December 1937; United Kingdom
- Died: 30 June 2021 (aged 83); United Kingdom
- Occupation: Historian

Academic background
- Education: St John's College, Oxford

Academic work
- Institutions: All Souls College, Oxford; Huntington Library, California; Trinity College, Cambridge; Institute of English Studies; Centre for History and Economics, University of Cambridge; Harvard University; The Atheneum

William Linn St Clair, FBA, FRSL (7 December 1937 – 30 June 2021) was a British historian, senior research fellow at the Institute of English Studies, School of Advanced Study, University of London, and author.

== Biography ==
William St Clair received his education at Kilsyth Academy, Comely Park School, Falkirk, Edinburgh Academy, and St John's College, Oxford. He started his career as an author and book reviewer; his reviews appeared in the Financial Times, The Times Literary Supplement, and The Economist.

St Clair was elected a Fellow of the Royal Society of Literature (FRSL) in 1973. He was visiting fellow at All Souls College, Oxford, in 1981–82. In 1985, he became a fellow of Huntington Library, California. In 1992, he was elected a Fellow of the British Academy (FBA), the United Kingdom's national academy for the humanities and social sciences, and was a Member of Council from 1996 to 2000. From 1992 to 1996, he was a fellow of All Souls College, Oxford. In the 1998/99 academic year, he was a visiting fellow commoner at Trinity College, Cambridge. From 1999 to 2006, he was a fellow of Trinity College, Cambridge. From 2005, he was senior research fellow at the Institute of English Studies, School of Advanced Study, University of London. From 2008, he was also senior research fellow at the Joint Centre for History and Economics (between Cambridge University and Harvard University).

William St Clair was also chairman of Open Book Publishers, an academic publisher of peer-reviewed monographs in the humanities and social sciences since 2008. Since 2008 he was also member of the Enterprise Management Committee, Re Enlightenment Project, main partners New York University, New York Public Library, and University of Cambridge.

William St Clair died on 30 June 2021.

== Work ==
His research interests lay, in large part, in the history of books and reading, ancient Greece and biography. St Clair was a founding member of Open Book Publishers, based in Cambridge (UK), and an active supporter of the Open Access movement.

=== Relating to the history of books and reading ===
- The Reading Nation in the Romantic Period (Cambridge: Cambridge University Press, 2004). The book centres on the Romantic period in the English-speaking world, but ranges across the whole print era, to reach conclusions about the forces that determined how ideas were carried, through print, into wider society. It provides an investigation of information on prices, print runs, intellectual property, and readerships gathered from over fifty publishing and printing archives.
- The Political Economy of Reading, revised edition, John Coffin Memorial Lecture in the History of the Book (University of London: School of Advanced Study, 2005).
- 'Publishing, Authorship, and Reading' in The Cambridge Companion to Fiction of the Romantic Period (Cambridge: Cambridge University Press, 2008).
- 'Following up The Reading Nation in The Cambridge History of the Book in Britain, Volume VI, 1830–1914 (Cambridge: Cambridge University Press, 2009).
- 'Metaphors of Intellectual Property' in Privilege and Property. Essays on the History of Copyright, eds. Lionel Bently, Ronan Deazley & Martin Kretschmer (Open Book Publishers, 2010).
- A Gentleman of Literary Eminence': A Review Essay, with Roger Paulin & Elinor Shaffer (University of London: School of Advanced Study, 2008).

=== Relating to the Parthenon Marbles ===
- Lord Elgin and the Marbles (London: Oxford University Press, 1967; 3rd Revised Edition, 1998). Translated into Italian, French and Greek.
- 'The Elgin Marbles: Questions of Stewardship and Accountability', International Journal of Cultural Property, 2 (1999).
- 'The Parthenon in 1687: New Sources' with Robert Picken, in The Parthenon and its Sculpture, ed. Michael Cosmopoulos (Cambridge: Cambridge University Press, 2004).
- 'Imperial Appropriations of the Parthenon', in Imperialism, Art and Restitution, ed. John Henry Merryman (Cambridge: Cambridge University Press, 2006). Chinese translation published by Tongji University Press, 2009.
- 'Who Saved the Parthenon? A New History of the Acropolis Before, During and After the Greek Revolution' (Cambridge: Open Book Publishers, 2022). (Reviewed by S. Marchand in 'Bryn Mawr Classical Review' 2023.01.41).
- 'The Classical Parthenon: Recovering the Strangeness of the Ancient World' (Cambridge: Open Book Publishers, 2022).

=== History and biography ===
- That Greece Might Still Be Free. The Philhellenes in the War of Independence (Oxford: Oxford University Press 1972). Awarded Heinemann prize by Royal Society of Literature. New edition with additional material, extra illustrations, an updated bibliography, and a New Introduction by Roderick Beaton (Open Book, 2008). An account of the philhellenes - or 'lovers of Greece' - who volunteered to fight for the Greek cause during the War of Independence (1821), against the rule of the Ottoman Turks.
- Adventures of a Younger Son by Edward John Trelawny, with an Introduction by William St. Clair (London: Oxford University Press, 1974).
- Trelawny, the Incurable Romancer (London: J. Murray, 1977).
- The Godwins and the Shelleys, The Biography of a Family (London: Faber and Faber and New York: Norton, 1989). Awarded Time-Life prize and Macmillan Silver Pen for an outstanding work of British non-fiction.
- Mapping Lives: The Uses of Biography, eds. Peter France & William St Clair (Oxford: Oxford University Press for the British Academy 2002). Essays on the nature of biography commissioned as part of the centenary celebrations of the British Academy. William St. Clair's essay is 'The Biographer as Archaeologist.'
- The Grand Slave Emporium: Cape Coast Castle and the British Slave Trade (London: Profile, 2006). Published in the U.S. as The Door of No Return, The History of Cape Coast Castle and the Transatlantic Slave Trade (New York, N.Y.: Bluebridge, 2007). Based on a huge archive of original documents previously scarcely explored.

=== Conduct literature ===
- Conduct Literature for Women, 1500–1640, eds. William St Clair & Irmgard Maassen (6 Volumes) (London: Pickering and Chatto, 2000).
- Conduct Literature for Women, 1640–1710, eds. William St Clair & Irmgard Maassen (6 Volumes) (London: Pickering and Chatto, 2002).

=== Evaluation ===
As part of work in the Treasury, William St Clair authored:

- Policy Evaluation: A Guide for Managers (HMSO, 1988). Translated, with adaptations, into several languages including, French, Arabic and Turkish.
- Executive Agencies: A Guide to Setting Targets and Judging Performance (HMSO, 1992).
