= 1937–1938 Elgin Marbles cleaning scandal =

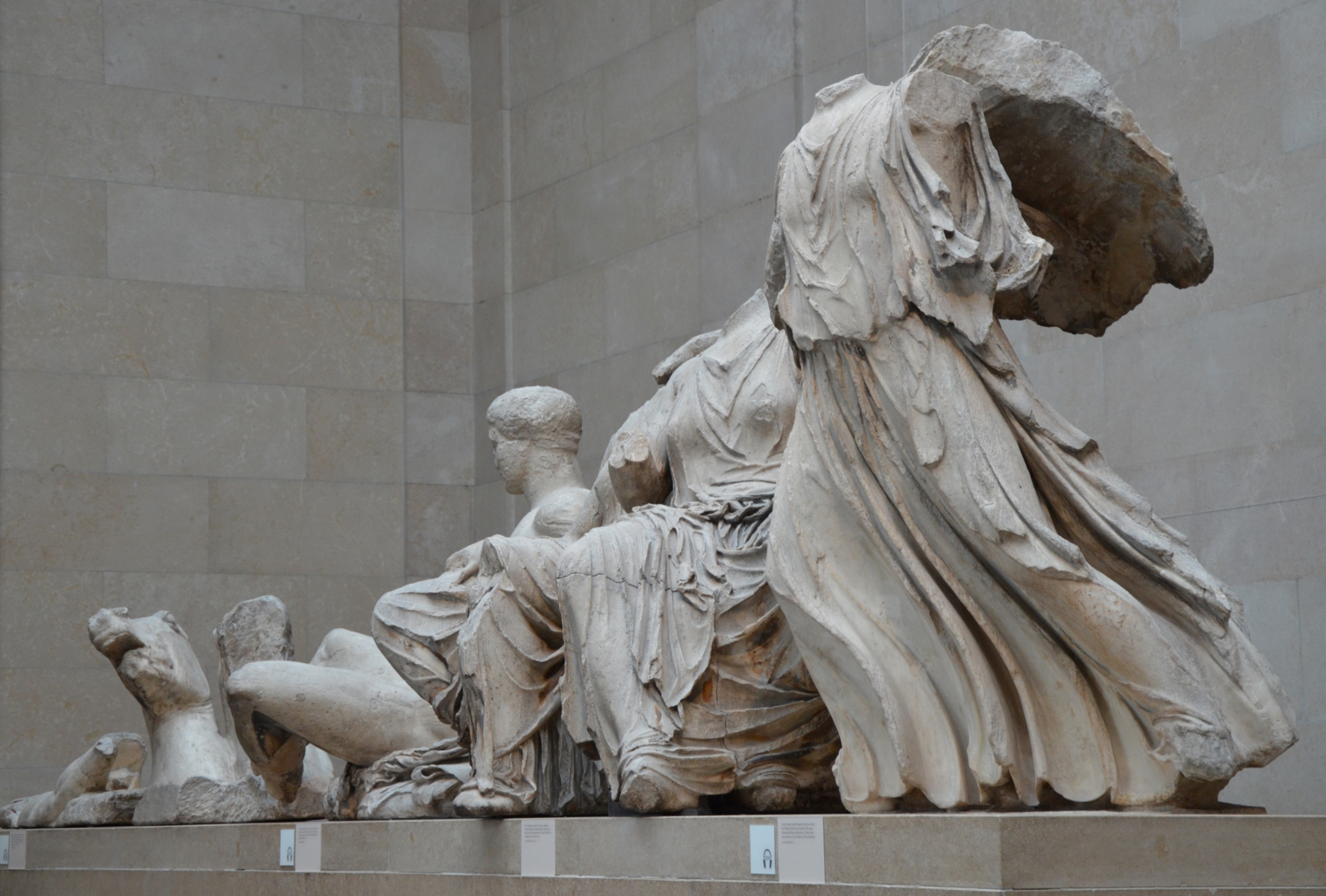
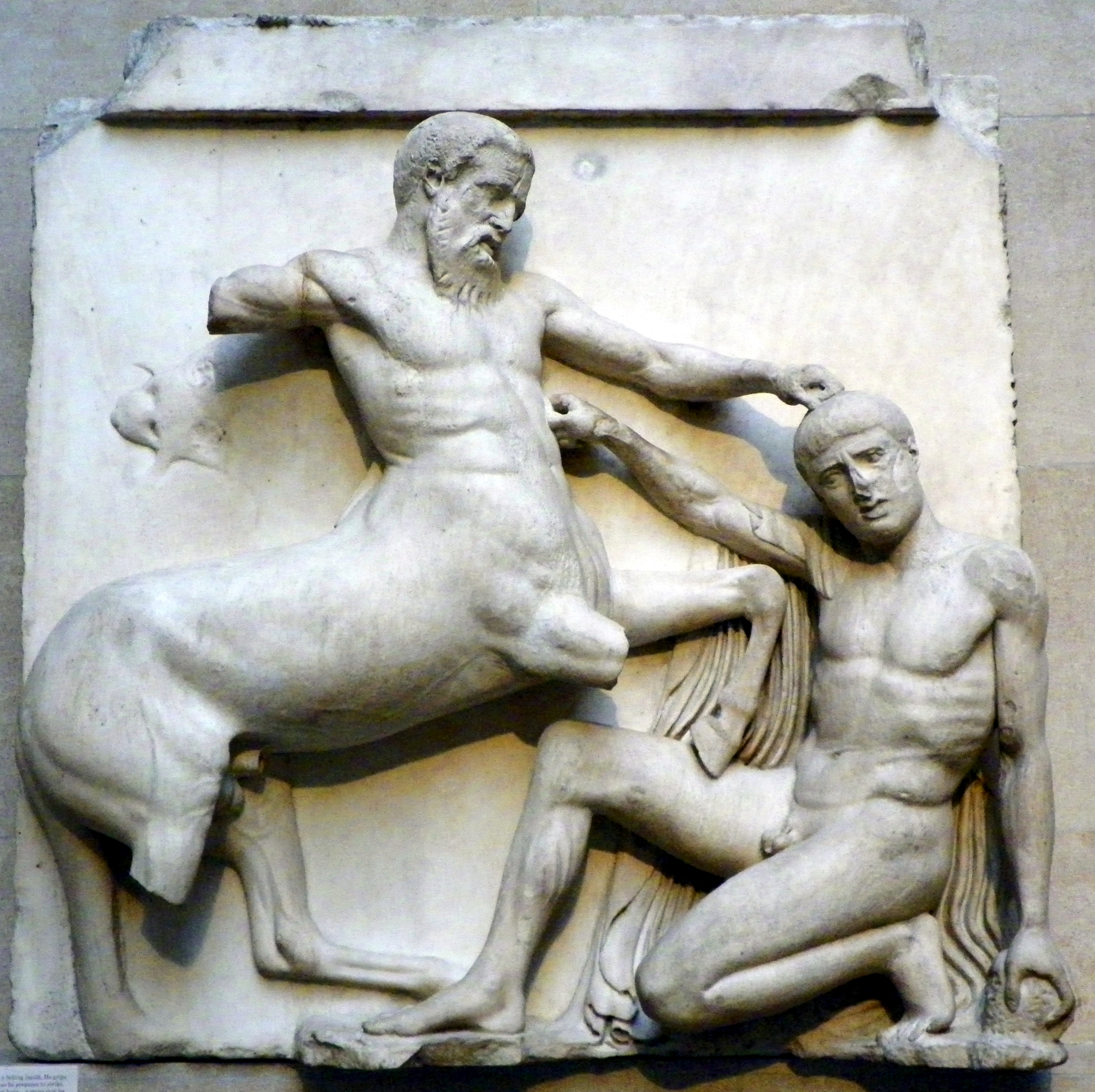
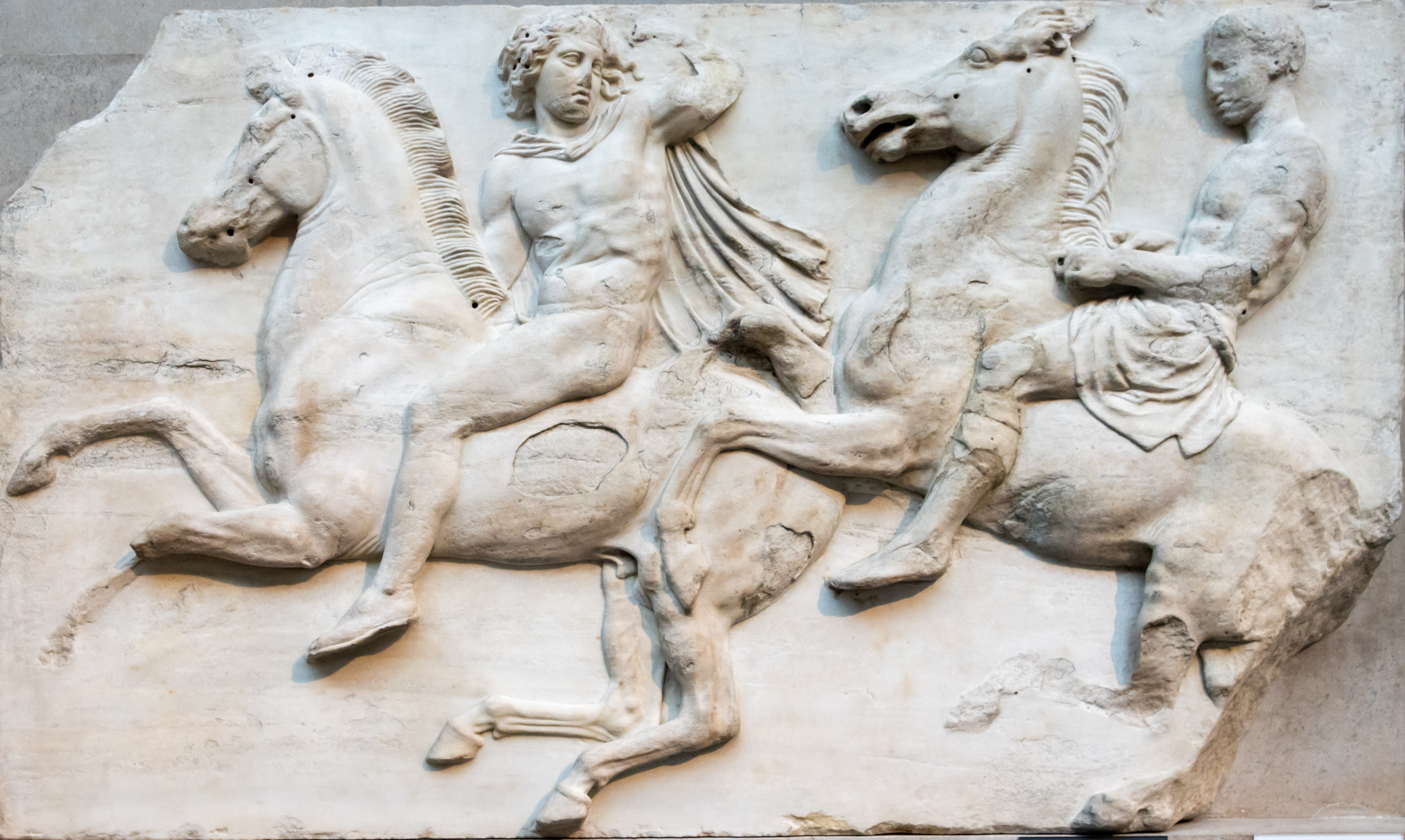
Examples of sculpture types represented in the Elgin Marbles. Clockwise from top: free-standing sculptures from the Parthenon's east pediment, a block of its frieze, and a metope.

Between 1937 and 1938, sculptures of the Elgin Marbles held by the British Museum in London were cleaned using aggressive and unauthorised methods. The sculptures originally came from the fifth-century BCE Parthenon on the Acropolis of Athens and had been purchased by the British government from Lord Elgin in 1816. By the nineteenth century, parts of the marbles had developed an orange-brown surface colouration, known as patina. Joseph Duveen, a wealthy businessman and art collector, wished this patina to be removed before the sculptures were relocated into a new gallery which he was funding.

The sculptures had been periodically cleaned since their arrival in the British Museum, largely to remove the stains caused by London's air pollution. This cleaning usually consisted of washing with water and mild chemicals; occasional attempts to use stronger cleaning agents, such as sulphuric acid and hard brushes, were stopped after criticism from the public. Duveen encouraged more aggressive cleaning, and some of the sculptures were cleaned between 1937 and 1938 using copper tools and abrasive carborundum. Duveen may have bribed museum staff to allow this, and museum officials initially ignored it.

The cleaning was brought to the attention of the museum's director, John Forsdyke, in September 1938. Forsdyke ordered the cleaning to stop and arranged for the museum's governing trustees to convene a board of investigation. Although the board found that "the damage is obvious and cannot be exaggerated", (Note: Quoted in Jenkins 2001, p. 2) the museum attempted to minimise public knowledge of the affair and damage to its reputation. The employee who had carried out much of the cleaning, Arthur Holcombe, was sacked. Frederick Pryce, who had been nominally in charge of the Department of Greek and Roman Antiquities, was induced to retire on grounds of health; Roger Hinks, who had been supervising the department due to Pryce's absence, was disciplined and soon resigned. Forsdyke denied that the dismissals were related to the cleaning, and initially refused to respond to enquiries from journalists.

Following negative reports in the press in early 1939, Forsdyke issued a statement to The Times, attempting to downplay the scandal. The government minister Harry Crookshank was asked about the cleaning three times in the House of Commons. Public interest in the scandal had largely died down by Duveen's death on 25 May, though the museum attempted to conceal evidence related to it until the 1990s. Following research by William St Clair, the British Museum held a conference on the cleaning in late 1999. Estimates of the damage done vary; it is generally agreed that the visible effect on the sculptures was slight, and that the principal scandal lay in the museum's long-term attempts at concealment. The affair has been repeatedly cited in connection with the potential restitution of the Elgin Marbles to Greece.

== Background ==
=== Acquisition of Parthenon sculptures by the British Museum ===
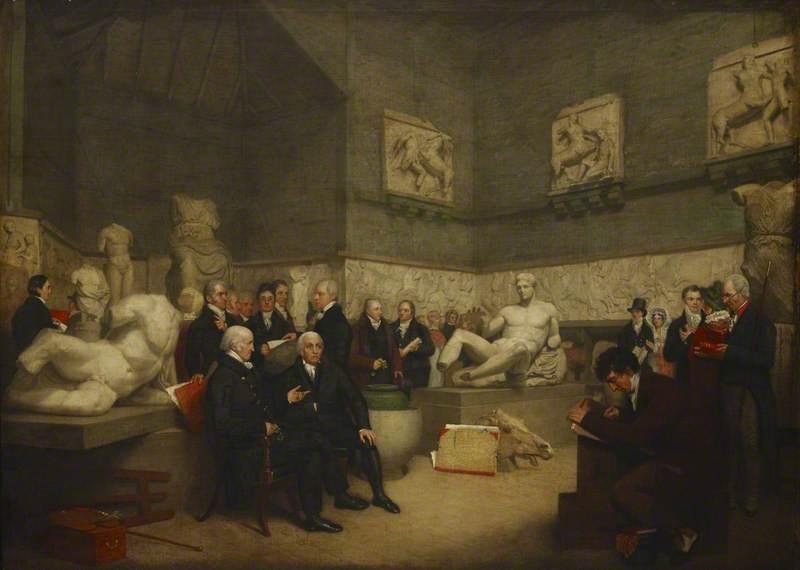
A painting showing the "temporary" Elgin Room in 1819. The marbles were displayed here from 1817 until 1831.

The Scottish aristocrat Lord Elgin served as British ambassador to the Ottoman Empire, which then ruled Greece, from 1799 until 1803. From 1801, he removed sculptures from the monuments of the Acropolis of Athens, including the fifth-century BCE structure known as the Parthenon. Elgin asked the sculptors Antonio Canova (in 1803) and John Flaxman to restore the marbles: both refused, with Canova describing the proposal as "sacrilege". The marbles were brought to Britain in various stages and on several vessels, including ships of the Royal Navy, between 1801 and 1812.

Elgin proposed in 1803 that an extension of the British Museum be built to house the Parthenon sculptures, but was rebuffed by the government. He put them on display in his own London house from 1807, and attempted to sell them to the state in 1811. On the latter occasion, he refused the government's offer of £30,000 (equivalent to £2,800,000 in 2024), which was less than half of the expenses he had incurred in removing and transporting them. (Note: In 1811, Elgin declared his expenses to date as £62,440 (equivalent to £5,786,000 in 2024); he later, in 1816, calculated his total expenditure as £74,240 (equivalent to £6,880,000 in 2024).) In 1816, the House of Commons accepted a petition from Elgin to form a select committee to discuss the marbles: Lord Aberdeen, a member of the committee, recommended offering £35,000 (equivalent to £3,500,000 in 2024) for them. Elgin agreed to accept the offer, and Parliament voted to approve it on 7 June. The marbles entered the British Museum on 8 August.

The collection purchased from Elgin included 17 statues from the east and west pediments of the Parthenon and 15 of its 92 metopes. It also included the majority – 75 metres (246 ft) – of the monument's surviving frieze. (Note: "The Parthenon Sculptures". The British Museum. 9 January 2023. For the origin of the pedimental sculptures, see Stahn 2023, p. 108. For the proportion of the frieze taken, see Subotić 2025, p. 948. For the total number of Parthenon metopes, see Isler-Kerényi 2015, p. 162.) Overall, the purchase constituted a large proportion of the surviving sculptures from the Parthenon, (Note: Anthony Snodgrass estimates that, as of 2005, the British Museum held approximately 49% of the known sculptures from the Parthenon, while also noting that several examples had been unearthed in Athens in excavations since the 1830s, after Elgin's acquisitions.) and also included other objects from the Acropolis, including a caryatid from the Erechtheion, parts of the frieze of the Temple of Athena Nike, and other fragments from the Propylaia and Erechtheion. It also included parts of the Treasury of Atreus at Mycenae. The marbles Elgin had collected from the Parthenon were displayed in a newly constructed room, intended to be temporary but used until 1831.

=== Early efforts to clean the sculptures ===
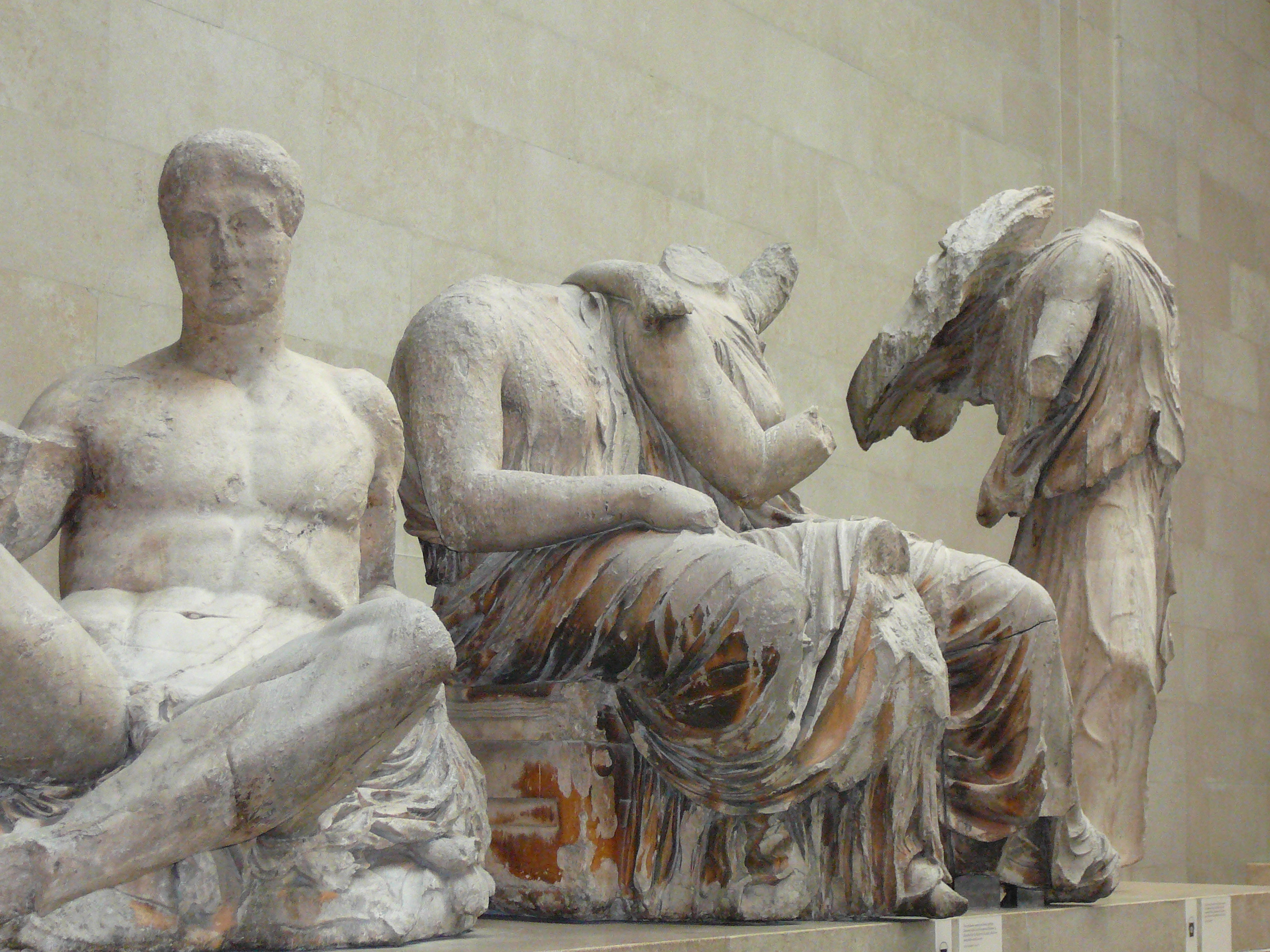
Traces of patina on sculptures from the Parthenon's east pediment

The Parthenon marbles, like many works of ancient marble sculpture, were originally painted, though little of their colour survived into the modern period. By the early nineteenth century, travellers to Greece had published accounts of seeing an orange-brown colouration, known as patina, on the surfaces of marble temples, including the Parthenon, and on some of the sculptures acquired by Elgin. (Note: Jenkins & Middleton 1988, pp. 183–184. See for instance Dodwell 1819, p. 344, with n. 1 for the British Museum sculptures.) In the first half of that century, scholars debated whether this colouration dated from antiquity or had come about through age: the Irish antiquarian Edward Dodwell thought it natural in 1819, while the German architect Gottfried Semper argued in 1834 that it was the remains of ancient polychromy. Semper's view was widely discussed in continental Europe, and in 1836 the trustees of the British Museum accepted a request from William Richard Hamilton, previously Lord Elgin's secretary, to investigate whether the Elgin Marbles preserved traces of paint. The investigating committee concluded that no evidence of ancient polychromy could be found on them, and that the patina was probably of natural origin.

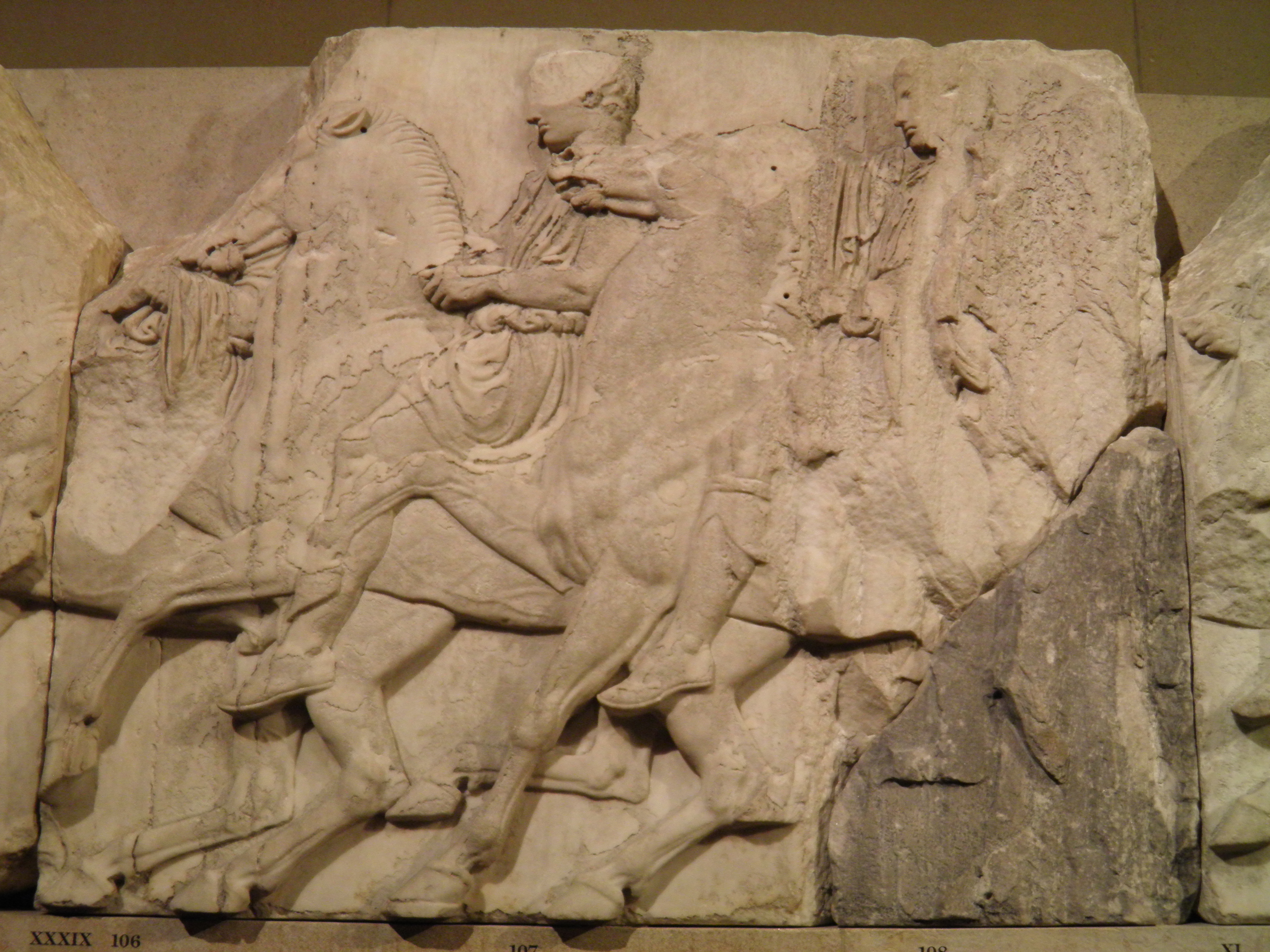
A slab from the Parthenon's north frieze: the lower right corner, uncleaned due to fragility since the nineteenth century, shows the sooty deposits that covered the marbles before the 1830s.

The British Museum did not systematically undertake conservation work on the objects in its collection in the nineteenth century, though pieces were periodically cleaned and conserved on an irregular basis. In 1811, workmen employed by the sculptor Joseph Nollekens were prevented by John Henning, another sculptor, from washing the Elgin Marbles with sulphuric acid. Plaster casts were made of the sculptures in 1817 and in 1836–1837. This process involved coating the marbles with a soap gel (to assist the plaster piece-mould in separating from the original), which was later removed by washing the sculptures twice with a strong acid or alkali. The marbles were moved from their initial display in the "temporary" Elgin Room, constructed in 1817, to a purpose-built gallery in 1832.

From 1845 onwards, museum officials began to express concern over the surface of the sculptures, which had been stained by the use of coal-fired stoves to heat the room in which they were displayed. The scientist Michael Faraday was commissioned to report on their state, and described them as "very dirty; some of them appearing as if dirty from a deposit of dust and soot formed upon them, and some of them, as if stained, dingy, and brown". (Note: Jenkins states that Faraday was approached in 1857; Oddy gives the date as 1838.) Faraday proposed the use of an alkaline sodium carbonate solution to wash the sculptures; the trustees of the museum approved this, and it may have been done regularly. Poultices of clay water were applied from 1857, and in 1858 the museum's trustees gave permission to Richard Westmacott to clean the sculptures with fuller's earth, an absorbent type of clay. (Note: Westmacott, a sculptor, was the son of the sculptor of the same name who had made the sculptures for the British Museum's pediment. He was employed from 1816 as the museum trustees' chief advisor on the display of the Parthenon sculptures.) An 1858 letter to The Times, signed pseudonymously "Marmor", (Note: "Marmor" being Latin for "marble".) criticised the removal by cleaning of the sculptures' patina, which the writer took as "the tone given by time to antique sculpture". A subsequent letter signed "W. D. B. S." complained of seeing "a man scrubbing away with some vile compound", and predicted that continued cleaning would require viewers to "bid adieu to the antique beauty of these marbles". At a meeting of the museum's trustees on 26 June, the museum's architect, Charles Cockerell, conveyed Westmacott's assurances that "his preparation contains no chemical mischief whatsoever". The trustees inspected the sculptures and approved the continuation of Westmacott's work.

Charles Newton, keeper of the Department of Greek and Roman Antiquities between 1861 and 1885, had the sculptures washed again, and also had the pieces of the frieze placed behind glass to protect them from pollution and reduce the need for further cleaning. (Note: Payne 2021, p. 138. For the years of Newton's tenure, see Beard 2000, p. 52.) The sculptures from the pediments remained outside the glass, and were occasionally washed. During the Victorian period, it was generally agreed that white was the most pleasing colour for the sculptures, partly driven by contemporary attitudes towards race, by which it was believed that the ancient Greeks had been light-skinned and blue-eyed. Even after it was shown that the sculptures were originally painted, some (such as the author Arnold Bennett) argued that the removal of their original colour represented an improvement. In the 1920s, they were routinely cleaned with water, hard brushes, and commercially available cleaning products; this practice was stopped after artists using them as models complained that it was overly destructive.

=== Preparations for the Duveen Gallery ===
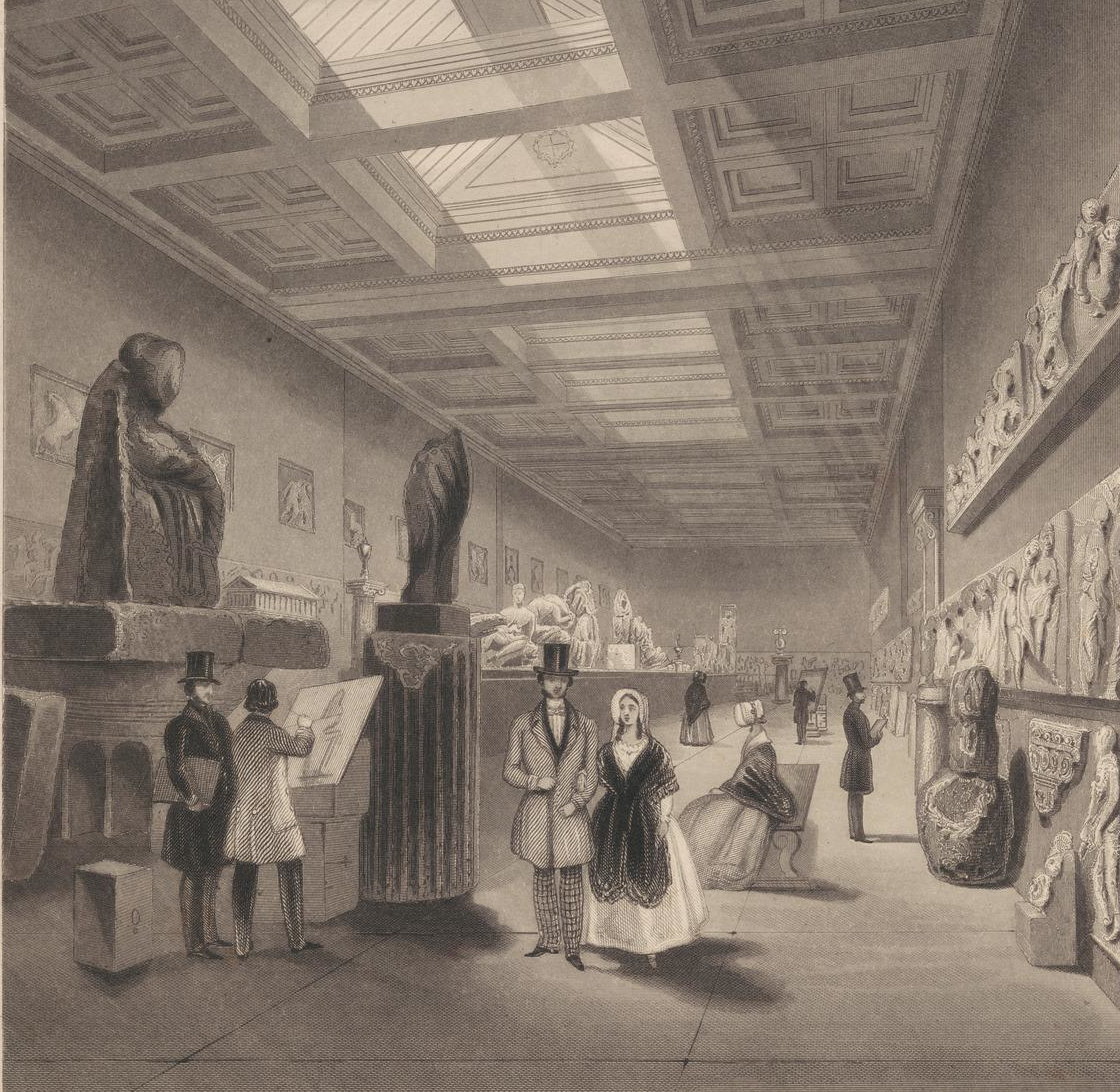
The "new" Elgin Room as it appeared in 1844, in an engraving by Edward Radclyffe

In 1928, the British Museum accepted an offer of funds from the wealthy businessman and art dealer Joseph Duveen to build a new gallery to house the Parthenon sculptures acquired from Elgin. (Note: Duveen also financed the construction of a new gallery at the Tate Gallery.) According to the historian William St Clair, Duveen was motivated by a desire to acquire status by association with the marbles, while the museum was partially motivated by a desire to legitimate its possession of them – the Elgin gallery was considered small, hot and dark, and observers including the French author Charles Maurras had suggested that its state indicated that the British Museum was unfit to hold the sculptures. (Note: The Prime Minister, Neville Chamberlain, would later write that Duveen's gallery had probably ensured that the British Museum would continue to hold the marbles.)

From 1932, Duveen repeatedly expressed his opinion to the trustees that the sculptures should be cleaned, so as to reveal "the actual colours of the marble" and allow the selection of the most appropriate colour for the new gallery's walls. In that year, Harold Plenderleith, a trained chemist employed as a conservator by the museum, supervised the test-cleaning of a metope and a block of the frieze, using a neutral solution of soap, ammonia and distilled water. The purpose of the test was to find a method of removing dirt which would not affect the underlying marble or patina. Plenderleith's method was used to clean sculptures from the Elgin collection throughout 1932 and 1933. These included the sculpture from the east pediment labelled as Figure G (variously identified as goddesses including Iris and Hebe (Note: These identifications were made in a British Museum guide of 1969; other proposals include Eileithyia and Hekate.)), as well as the entire portion of the frieze displayed on the Elgin Room's west side. In 1934, the museum published a book stating that the marbles' conservation consisted of regular brushing with feather dusters, as well as an annual wash with distilled water, under curatorial supervision. (Note: St Clair 1999, p. 414. The book is Plenderleith 1934.)

The cleaning of the Elgin Marbles stopped between early 1934 and 1936. In the latter year, construction of the Duveen Gallery began, and John Forsdyke, who had been keeper of the Department of Greek and Roman Antiquities since 1932, was promoted to director of the museum. Cleaning resumed under his successor, Frederick Pryce. In the summer of 1937, 15 blocks of the frieze (14 from the north frieze and one from the west), already cleaned in 1932, were re-cleaned and stripped back to the original marble, removing modern restorations made in plaster and limestone. The work was led by Arthur Holcombe, the museum's foreman of masons. According to his later testimony, Pryce initially supervised much of the cleaning, but was increasingly absent from the workshop. Further sculptures continued to be cleaned using Plenderleith's method until 26 September 1937.

== 1937–1938 cleaning ==
Tools used in the cleaning: several copper scrapers, a copper chisel, and a piece of carborundum. A brush, reported to have been used in the 1930s, was later added to these.

The classicist Mary Beard suggests that Duveen's deteriorating health – he knew that he was terminally ill with cancer from 1934, and he would die of it in 1939 – made him "more than usually demanding and difficult to deal with". (Note: Beard 2010, p. 168. For the details of Duveen's condition, see Behrman 1951.) Duveen believed that the surface of the sculptures ought to be evenly white in colour, and employed a restorer by the name of Coulette to investigate means of filling gaps in the sculpture to make their colour more uniform. Duveen's workers were given their own keys to the department, and museum staff stopped their usual daily inspections of the sculptures.

Directed by Duveen's representatives, Holcombe and six workers – mason's labourers rather than archaeological conservators – cleaned about 60% of the surface of the metopes, and smaller fractions of sculptures from the frieze and pediments, from June 1937 into 1938. They employed copper scrapers and abrasive silicon carbide (carborundum). Other substances, probably commercially purchased abrasives, were also used. (Note: St Clair 1999, p. 418. On the nature of the copper tools, see Oddy 2002, p. 142.) St Clair, noting the large quantities of marble dust later found on the carborundum, suggests that it was used to smooth chips made in the marble by the scrapers; the British art historian John Boardman posits that it may have been used to flake off traces of water incrustation, or to clean the copper tools. Andrew Oddy, the museum's chief conservator between 1985 and 2002, considers it likely that Duveen paid bribes to museum staff to allow his work. As Boardman characterises it, Duveen's actions were "ignored by a weak and largely self-serving administration in the museum".

In 1997, Plenderleith told St Clair that he had witnessed Duveen's workers cleaning the Elgin Marbles with metal tools, and ordered them to stop. Sidney Smith, a keeper in the Department of Egyptian and Assyrian Antiquities, informed Forsdyke on 22 September 1938 that parts of the frieze had acquired "a somewhat raw appearance". Pryce was on leave owing to ill-health, ultimately caused by alcoholism. In his absence, Roger Hinks was in charge of the Department of Greek and Roman Antiquities. Forsdyke ordered Hinks to investigate the report. On 25 September, Forsdyke saw sculptures in the process of being cleaned on a bench in the museum's basement workshop. These were from the Parthenon's east pediment, depicting the god Helios and his horses. The following day, Hinks discovered two other statues from the same pediment – Figure G and the horse of the goddess Selene – undergoing the same sort of cleaning. The horse's head was in Holcombe's workshop and Figure G in a side-room of the new Duveen gallery. Forsdyke later reported discovering copper tools and a piece of carborundum near the sculptures being cleaned.

Forsdyke ordered the cleaning to stop. At his request, Plenderleith wrote a short report giving his assessment of the damage. He collected the tools during his investigation: he found seven copper scrapers, one copper chisel, and a small piece of carborundum. Oddy's assessment of the tools stated that the scrapers were suitable only for use by hand (rather than for chiselling, which would need the accompanying use of a mallet). He also noted burring on the working end of the chisel, showing that it had been used, but only slight possible evidence of striking on its rear end, which he took as evidence against repeated use. Oddy later added to these a bristle-brush, which was given to him by a mason who said it had been used on the sculptures in the 1930s; Oddy described it as "quite innocuous ... [and] fairly soft".

The governance of the museum was ultimately vested in its board of trustees. Forsdyke reported to the board's standing committee on 8 October that "some important pieces had been greatly damaged" by "unauthorised and improper efforts to improve [their] colour". He called for a museum board of inquiry into the cleaning, which was established. It was later determined that the metopes and the north frieze had been cleaned in the same fashion; these sculptures had been placed back on display. (Note: St Clair suggests that a light patch on the reverse of Figure M from the east pediment, perhaps representing Aphrodite, may also have been caused by similar cleaning.) When news of the cleaning was revealed in the press, sculptures concerned, including the metopes and the affected pedimental figures, were removed from public display. (Note: St Clair 1999, p. 425. This had happened by 1 May, when the sculptures' absence was noted in the Daily Telegraph.)

== British Museum investigation ==
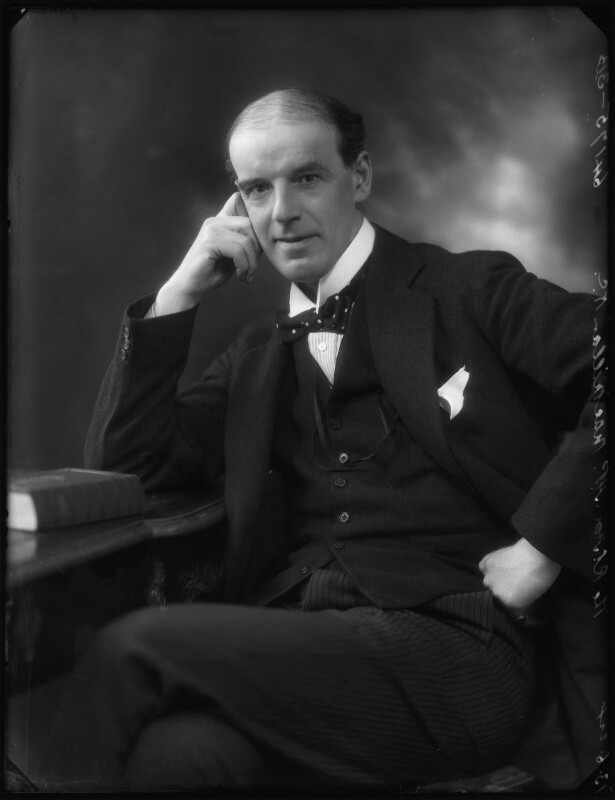
Lord Macmillan, chair of the British Museum's board of inquiry into the cleaning, photographed in 1924

The museum's board of inquiry was chaired by Lord Macmillan and further consisted of Lord Harlech, a trustee of several London museums; the physicist William Henry Bragg; Charles Reed Peers, formerly Chief Inspector of Ancient Monuments; and the lawyer Wilfred Greene. The board met three times, on 11 and 20 October and 1 November 1938; Peers did not attend the first meeting, having been injured in an accident.

Beard characterises the investigation as "buck-passing and self-interested exculpation". Ian Jenkins, then the deputy keeper of the Department of Greek and Roman Antiquities responsible for the marbles, similarly called it in 2001 an attempt by Forsdyke "to create scapegoats for what was ultimately his responsibility". The board investigated only the pedimental sculptures, rather than the metopes and pieces of the frieze, though Forsdyke had previously indicated that parts of the frieze had been cleaned by the same methods, and it was suspected that the same was true of the metopes. St Clair thus characterises it as "a deliberate shutting of eyes and ears". Peers suggested that the board draw up a complete record of the damage done to the sculptures, which could be made available to future scholars studying them; this was not done. The board further attempted to minimise the apparent scale of the problem by treating the status of Helios and his horses, previously considered two distinct works, as a single "Helios group".

The board called as witnesses Pryce, Hinks, Smith, Plenderleith, Holcombe, the mason V. A. Fisher, G. E. Forman and A. W. T. Lovelock: the latter two worked as labourers assisting the masons of the Department of Greek and Roman Antiquities. Duveen's agents were not questioned. The board heard that, contrary to the published cleaning procedures, tools had routinely been used to clean the sculptures since at least 1937. Holcombe initially denied using copper tools, though the board considered that he had done so.

The board's interim report was published internally on 7 November 1938. It concluded that "the damage is obvious and cannot be exaggerated". For the published version of the report, Macmillan watered down the language of its draft, whose author is unknown; he removed the suggestion that the marbles no longer constituted "authentic masterpieces" of Greek art and a further suggestion that the board may not have been able to assess the full amount of damage done. Peers advocated for both Pryce and Hinks to resign rather than be officially dismissed, as this would improve their chances of receiving pensions and allow the museum to avoid revealing the damage done to the sculptures. After reviewing the report, the standing committee of the trustees questioned Pryce and Hinks at the board meeting of 10 November. Cosmo Lang, the Archbishop of Canterbury and chair of the trustees, led the questioning, and James Rae, the senior Treasury official responsible for civil service personnel, was in attendance. (Note: Employees of the British Museum were civil servants, and approval from the Treasury was required for any arrangement which allowed Pryce or Hinks to retain pension rights if they were to be dismissed or to retire for reasons of ill-health.)

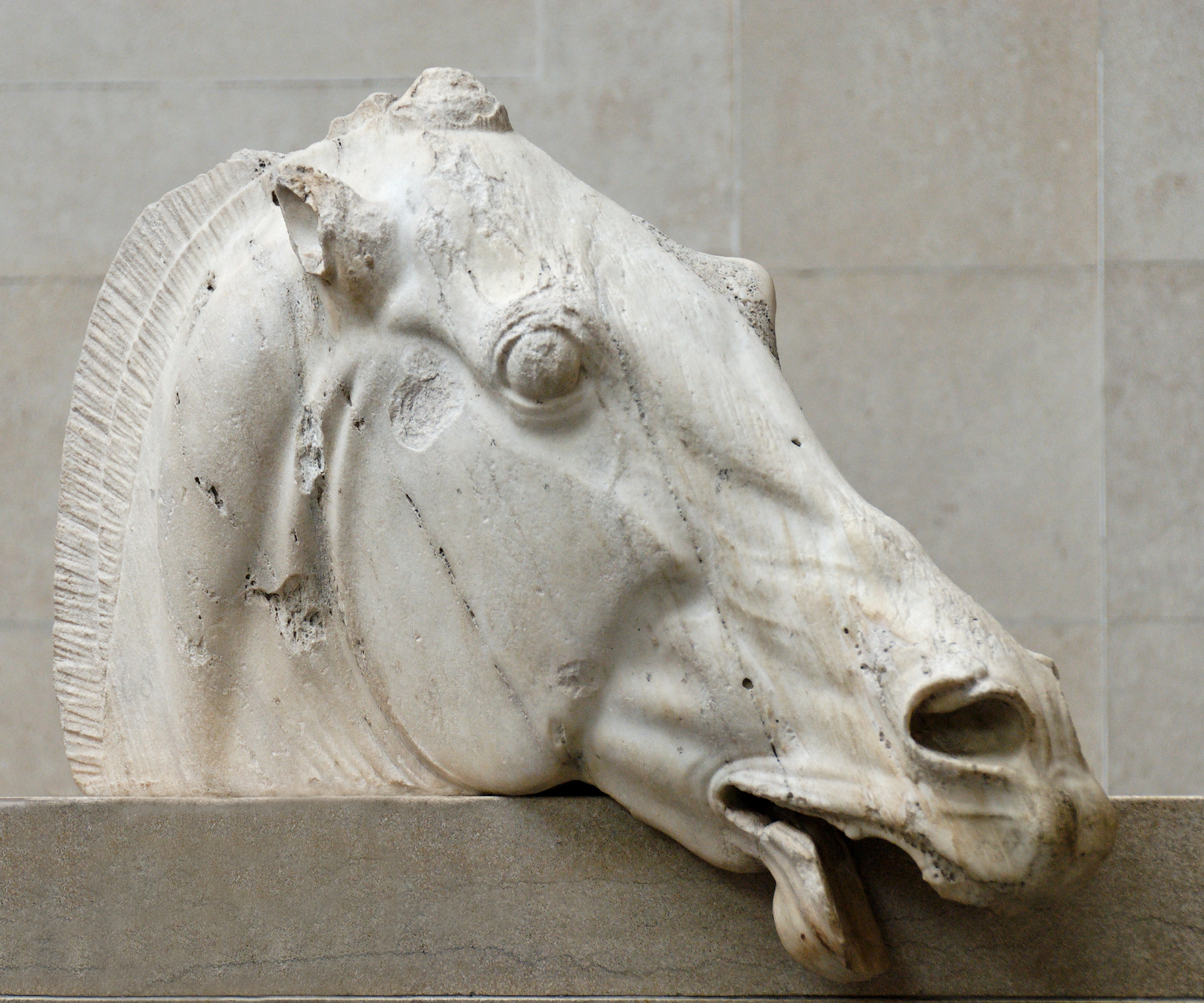
The head of the horse of Selene, photographed in 2007. Forsdyke saw this sculpture undergoing cleaning in 1938.

Pryce was offered the opportunity to retire on grounds of ill-health rather than face disciplinary action. He accepted, and two doctors' certificates were produced which suggested sinusitis as a possible cause of his behaviour. Hinks (aged thirty-five) declined the same opportunity; he was initially docked ten years of seniority and concomitant pay, then resigned in January 1939 on the understanding that the disciplinary proceedings would be undone and the museum would assist him in finding another job. (Note: Resigning rather than retiring meant that Hinks lost his rights to a pension. He was soon offered, and accepted, a post at the Warburg Institute of the University of London.) Holcombe's contract was terminated; he retained his pension. Martin Robertson, a junior assistant keeper, was demoted in seniority, despite not being involved, and retained as the sole remaining member of curatorial staff in the Department of Greek and Roman Antiquities. In a biographical chapter on Forsdyke, Rachel Hood considers that responsibility for the cleaning was most probably his, and that he was probably the one who had begun the cleaning programme during his time as keeper; she calls Hinks the "undoubted scapegoat in the matter".

Following the investigation, Forsdyke and Plenderleith applied what the trustees' standing committee called "remedial measures" to the pedimental sculptures affected, intended to conceal the effects of the cleaning. St Clair suggests that this consisted of some sort of colourant that would mimic the patina. Bernard Ashmole, the Yates Professor of Classical Art and Archaeology at University College London, was brought in on a part-time basis to run the Department of Greek and Roman Antiquities. He recruited Denys Haynes, then working at the Victoria and Albert Museum, as a second assistant keeper. Forsdyke initially claimed that the departures and demotions were unrelated to the cleaning, though a 1983 internal museum report by the keeper Brian Cook called this a "pretence". Cook pointed out that its untruth had already been stated during the contemporary discussions in the House of Commons. The museum attempted to minimise public knowledge about the cleaning into the 1990s; officials tried to keep primary documentation unpublished, partly by filing it in an extremely large binder alongside other documents of different dates, to which newer material was added so that it would not have to be released to the public under the thirty-year rule.

== Contemporary reaction ==
=== In the press ===
The board of inquiry decided not to issue a public statement to the press; Harlech warned that an "unduly alarmist reaction by the lay press" would lead to "questions in Parliament which will drag out the horrid truth bit by bit" and be exploited by anti-British elements in Germany and Greece. Macmillan and Lang agreed with Forsdyke in early December 1938 that no statement would be issued, but that Forsdyke would prepare to answer questions from experts if asked, and work towards the creation of a full record of the sculptures that had been cleaned.

On 9 February 1939, Lang wrote to Forsdyke that elements of the press, which he considered likely to be the Daily Express owned by Lord Beaverbrook, were rumoured to have found out about the Elgin Marbles affair. On 19 March, The Daily Telegraph published a short piece noting the resignations of Pryce and Hinks, and conveying the museum's official statement that there was no connection between these departures and "the reported disagreement ... over the cleaning of the Elgin Marbles". A further Telegraph article on 21 March stated that "those qualified to express an opinion" were commenting that recent cleaning had deprived the sculptures of "the warmth of their patina", and urged Forsdyke to make a statement to forestall Greek arguments that they would be safer if reinstalled on the Parthenon.

The Daily Mail wrote to Forsdyke on the same day; he refused to provide a statement, and likewise rebuffed The Daily Telegraph when they asked him to do so on 25 March, though he had one prepared and Lang had approved of its tone. The Mail published a story on 25 March claiming that "irreparable damage" had been done to the marbles by the removal of patina, leaving "an unnatural whiteness". The Telegraph likewise complained on 1 May that the casts placed on museum display in lieu of the cleaned sculptures represented "ingenious methods" to hide the damage done. The same report communicated "a rather ungrateful whispering campaign" that Duveen was responsible for the cleaning. On 11 May, a letter from David Hunt, an academic at Magdalen College, Oxford, was published in the Telegraph, calling for the museum to make a statement on the marbles, commenting that they were public property and had been purchased with taxpayers' money. The Sunday Times published a similar letter from the writer Robert Byron on 14 May, which alluded to "hints of irregularity" in the press and "more than hints in private conversation". Byron further wrote that "the lustre and the gentleness [of the marbles] have vanished. The lumps of stone remain, robbed of life, dead as casts."

A contemporary newspaper cartoon satirising the reaction to the cleaning, referencing the views of the sculptor Jacob Epstein

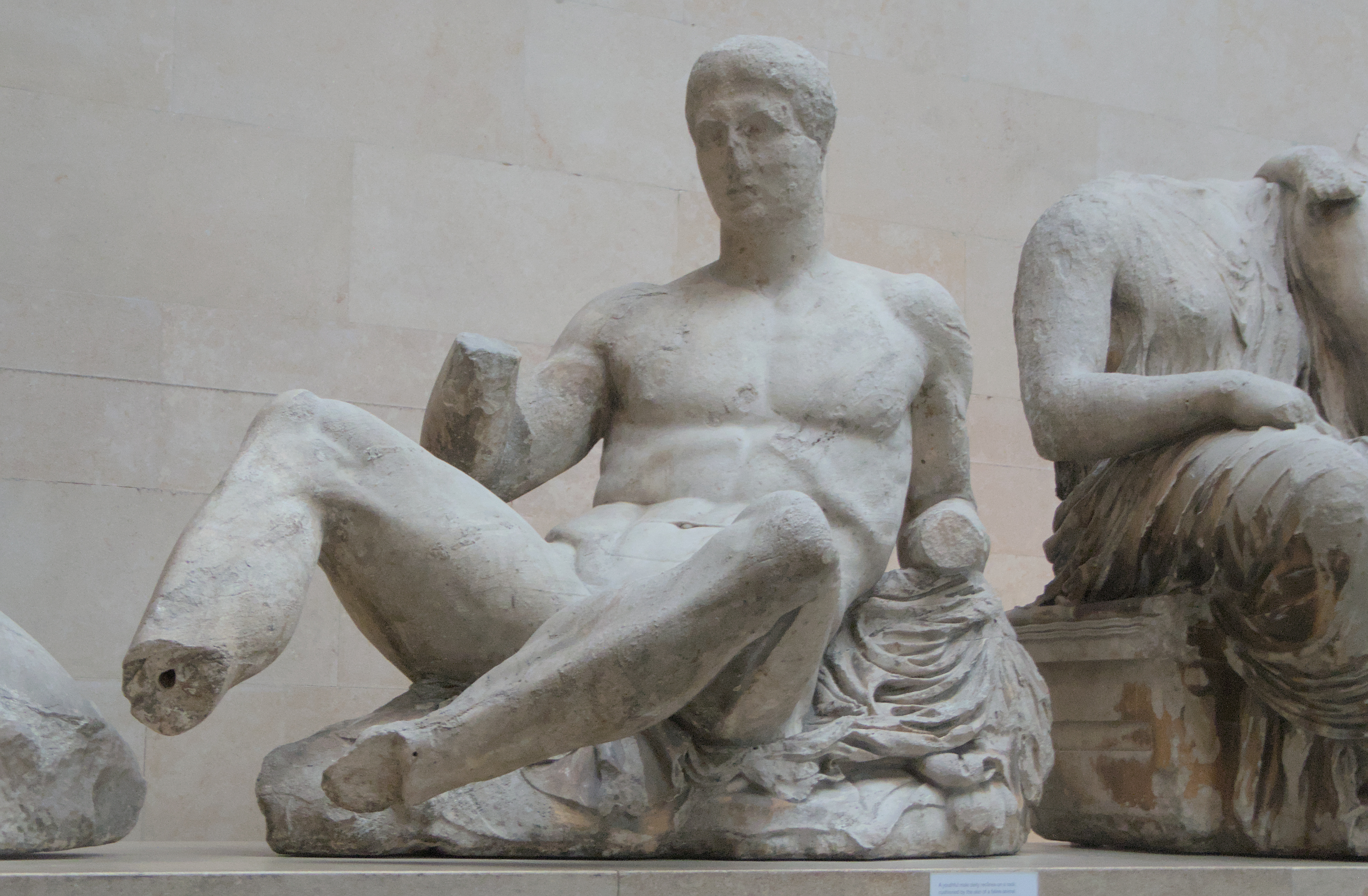
The sculpture depicted in the newspaper cartoon, photographed in 2023. It comes from the Parthenon's east pediment and is generally believed to represent either Dionysus, Heracles or Theseus. It was not cleaned in 1937–1938.

Forsdyke eventually did issue a statement, printed in The Times on 18 May, that "unauthorized methods" had been used to clean the marbles, that the museum officials responsible for cleaning had had no knowledge of them, and that their effect was "imperceptible" to anyone except an expert. Duveen's role was not mentioned. On 19 May, having interviewed Holcombe at his home, the Daily Express published the latter's remarks that he and six labourers under his charge had been ordered to clean the marbles two years previously, that he had used "a blunt copper tool" to do so, and that he had used tools of the same sort on the museum's sculptures since at least the directorship of Edward Maunde Thompson, who had retired in 1909.

After reading the Express article, the sculptor Jacob Epstein gave an interview in The Evening News in which he criticised the museum authorities as "ignorant and opinionated almost beyond belief" and for relying on the advice of archaeologists and chemists instead of sculptors. George Hill, who had been director of the British Museum until 1936, exchanged mutually critical letters with Epstein in The Times, beginning with Hill's on 22 May and continuing with Epstein's on 25 May, with a final response by Hill on 26 May. Hill's final letter discussed claims by the Telegraph's art critic Thomas Wade Earp to have found damage on the cavalcade depicted on the Parthenon's north frieze and on the figures of Cecrops and his daughter from its west pediment. The cavalcade had in truth not been cleaned, and the museum's Cecrops group, as Hill pointed out, were plaster casts of the originals, which had never been removed from the Parthenon. (Note: Jenkins 2001, p. 11. For Earp's full name, see Boulton 2004, p. xxxv. For the non-cleaning of the cavalcade, see Jenkins 2001, p. 28.) A newspaper cartoon drawn in response to Epstein depicted a visitor to the museum looking at a badly weathered sculpture and remarking that Epstein had been right, and that it must have been cleaned with a pickaxe. Jenkins describes the cartoon as "funny because it is deliberately misleading" – the statue in question had not been cleaned in 1937–1938 – but also as characteristic of the press response to the cleaning.

Duveen died on 25 May 1939, and the cleaning largely disappeared from the public discourse: a letter in The Manchester Guardian on 9 June represents, in Jenkins's words, "the last major piece on the subject". That letter stated that "only a microscopic comparison" between the marbles and enlarged photographs of their previous states could reveal the damage, and that the "subtleties of modelling" had been unaffected. (Note: Quoted in Jenkins 2001, pp. 11–12.)

=== In Parliament ===
Harry Crookshank, the Conservative Financial Secretary to the Treasury, was asked by the National Labour MP Frank Markham about the cleaning in the House of Commons on 18 May 1939. Crookshank stated, having obtained Forsdyke's approval to do so, that any damage done was minor. He repeated Forsdyke's words that the results of the cleaning were "imperceptible to anyone but an expert". On 26 May, the Liberal MP Reginald Fletcher asked Crookshank about the duration of the cleaning and the steps taken to alert Forsdyke to it. Crookshank responded that the cleaning had gone on for about 15 months up to September 1938, and that Forsdyke had not been informed because cleaning was the responsibility of the department's keepers. On 6 June, another Liberal MP, Geoffrey Mander, asked Crookshank about the cleaning, while the Labour MP Seymour Cocks suggested that the marbles ought to be returned to Athens. Crookshank offered no reply to Cocks's suggestion, but affirmed to Mander that the museum had taken disciplinary action.

== Legacy ==
=== Estimates of damage ===
==== Nature of the surface prior to cleaning ====
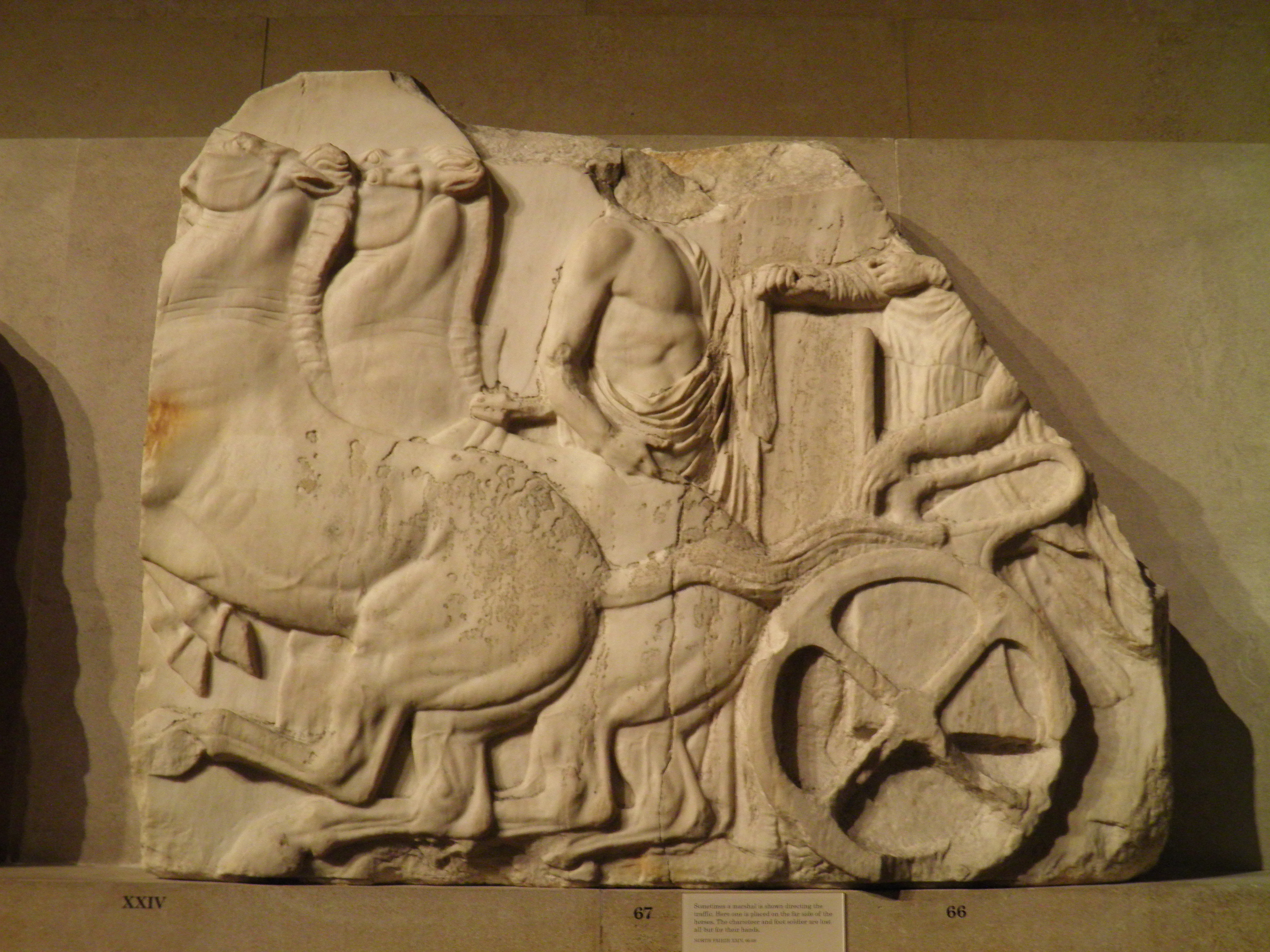
Part of the Parthenon's north frieze, showing charioteers. This part of the frieze was cleaned in 1937–1938; the rump of the leftmost horse was smoothed to address damage of biological origin.

Assessing the nature of the patina in 1988, Jenkins and Andrew Middleton concluded that its origin was uncertain, but that it was unlikely to be entirely natural: they suggested that it was probably the remains of a coating applied to the sculptures in ancient times. St Clair affirmed the likelihood of this hypothesis in 1999, while also noting the alternative and potentially complementary explanations that the colouration was created by oxidation of iron particles within the marble, and perhaps through the actions of factors such as fire, damp, dirt and lichen between antiquity and Elgin's acquisition of the marbles.

Beard considers that the vast majority of the original surface must have been lost by the nineteenth century, and in any case would have been removed early in that century by the combined effects of Elgin's cleaning, transportation from Greece, and the use of the sculptures to make moulds for plaster casts. Jenkins specifically estimates that less than 20% of the original surface coating was left by the time the British Museum acquired the marbles. It is difficult in modern times to establish how much of that surface was covered by patina, since photographs, artistic depictions and descriptions from before the cleaning vary substantially in how much they show. Other contemporary marbles outside the British Museum have themselves been cleaned or damaged by pollution in modern times, making them unusable for comparison.

==== Assessments of the impact of cleaning ====
Jenkins estimates that the cleaning affected about half of the total surface of the marbles: he estimates this as 10% of the east pediment sculptures (those of Helios, the heads of his horses and of that of Selene, and Figure G), 40% of the frieze (consisting of most of the south frieze, two blocks of the west, and the charioteers from the north), and 60% of the metopes, the latter primarily on the backgrounds rather than the figures.

In Plenderleith's initial report, he estimated that the cleaning may have removed up to 0.1 inches (2.5 mm) from parts of the sculptures' surface. Oddy considers this unlikely, given that the copper tools used were relatively soft and unsuited for removing large amounts of hard marble. Boardman states that weathering over centuries creates ridges in the surface of marble sculptures; by comparison with early casts, he suggests that this weathering pattern was removed from parts of the horse of Selene, reducing the surface level by approximately 1 millimetre (0.04 in) but returning it to the smooth state it would originally have had. From comparison with early casts of the head of the horse of Selene, Emma Payne similarly considers Plenderleith's estimate to be an exaggeration. Amerimni Galanos and Yanno Doganis, studying the sculptures in 2003, estimated the depth removed at approximately 150 micrometres (0.15 mm).

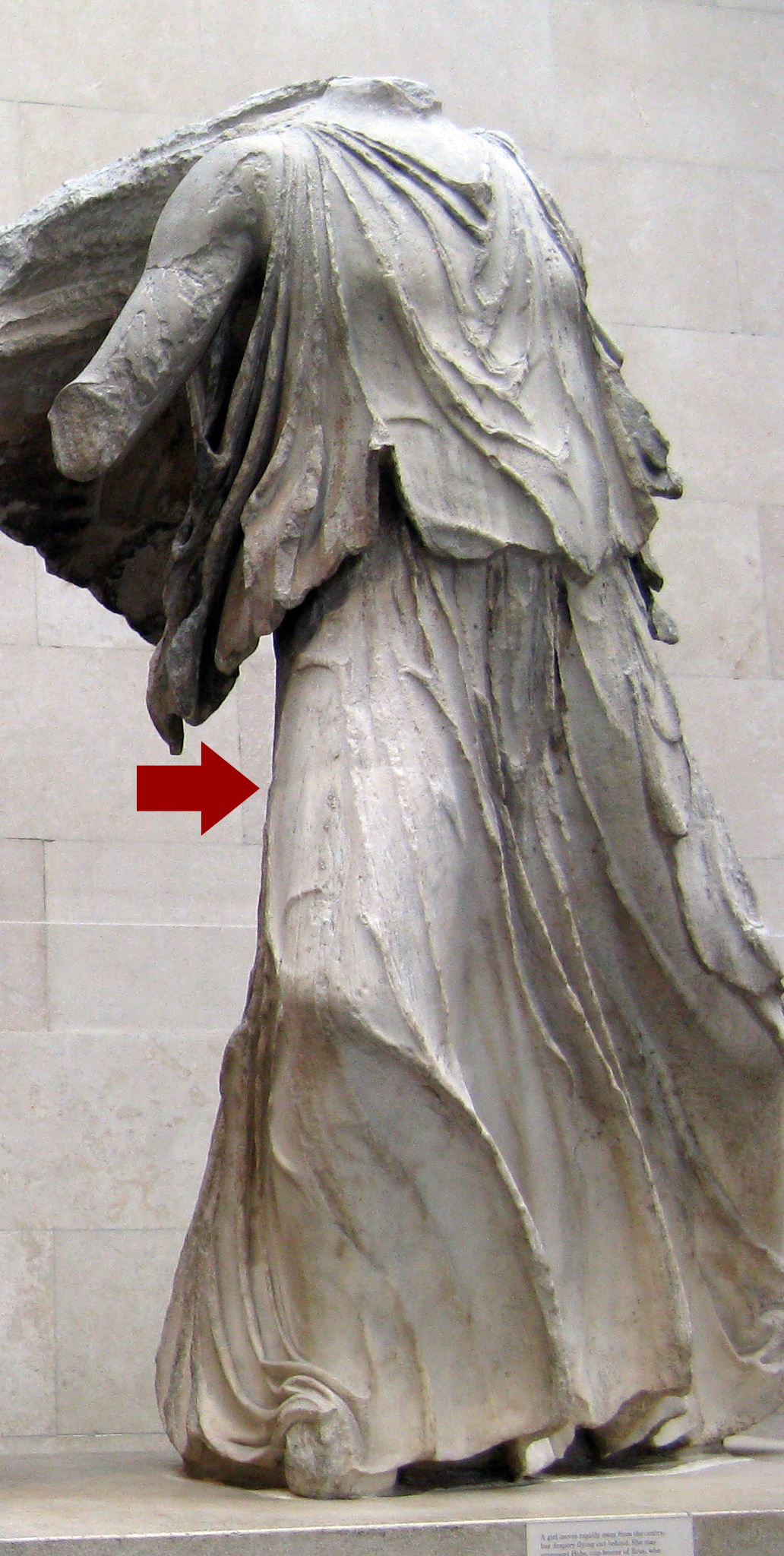
Figure G from the east pediment. Cook considered it to show a clear "line of demarcation" between the lower cleaned parts and the upper untouched areas; this is marked by an arrow.

Lord Crawford, a trustee who had not been involved in the enquiry, wrote that the scandal was "much more serious than [he] had anticipated, much damage having been done by overcleaning in a drastic manner". Boardman writes that the neck of the Helios statue was clearly scraped, but only to a small degree: he observes that ancient toolmarks can still be seen, albeit slightly blurred, on the cleaned surface. In Cook's 1983 report, he stated that "the actual extent of the damage is open to exaggeration", but that "the difference is obvious" to a trained eye between the parts of the frieze that were cleaned and those that were not. He further stated that a "readily visible ... line of demarcation" could be seen on the thighs of Figure G: its lower parts had been cleaned, while the upper parts had not.

Retrospective assessments generally assess the visible damage to be slight. Jenkins wrote in 1999 that, contrary to the findings of the board of inquiry, "the 'damage' was far from obvious and [had] been much exaggerated". A confidential internal memorandum written by the museum in 1962 for its trustees stated that, at the time that the cleaning was discovered, "no-one could tell by ordinary means of inspection which of the marbles had been cleaned by which method", or whether the cleaning had actually removed any colouration. On Figure G, Boardman considers that there is no discernible difference between the surface level of the cleaned and uncleaned parts, suggesting that no measurable amount of the original surface was lost, and that the colouration visible on the uncleaned parts represents modern pollution rather than patina. In general, he states that early casts of the sculptures show no more detail than the sculptures do in modern times, suggesting that any damage was relatively minor. Payne likewise judges that the contemporary media overstated the effect of the cleaning, pointing to the difficulty of securely identifying examples of damage.

John Goldsmith, editing the publication of Hinks's diaries in 1984, called the affair "a monumental fuss about nothing". (Note: Quoted in Wilson 2002, p. 243.) David Wilson, the museum's director between 1977 and 1992, wrote in an official 2002 history of the British Museum that the damage done to the sculptures was minor, and that the reputational damage to the museum largely resulted from its attempts to cover up the affair and from its lack of openness with the press and general public.

=== Scholarly reception ===
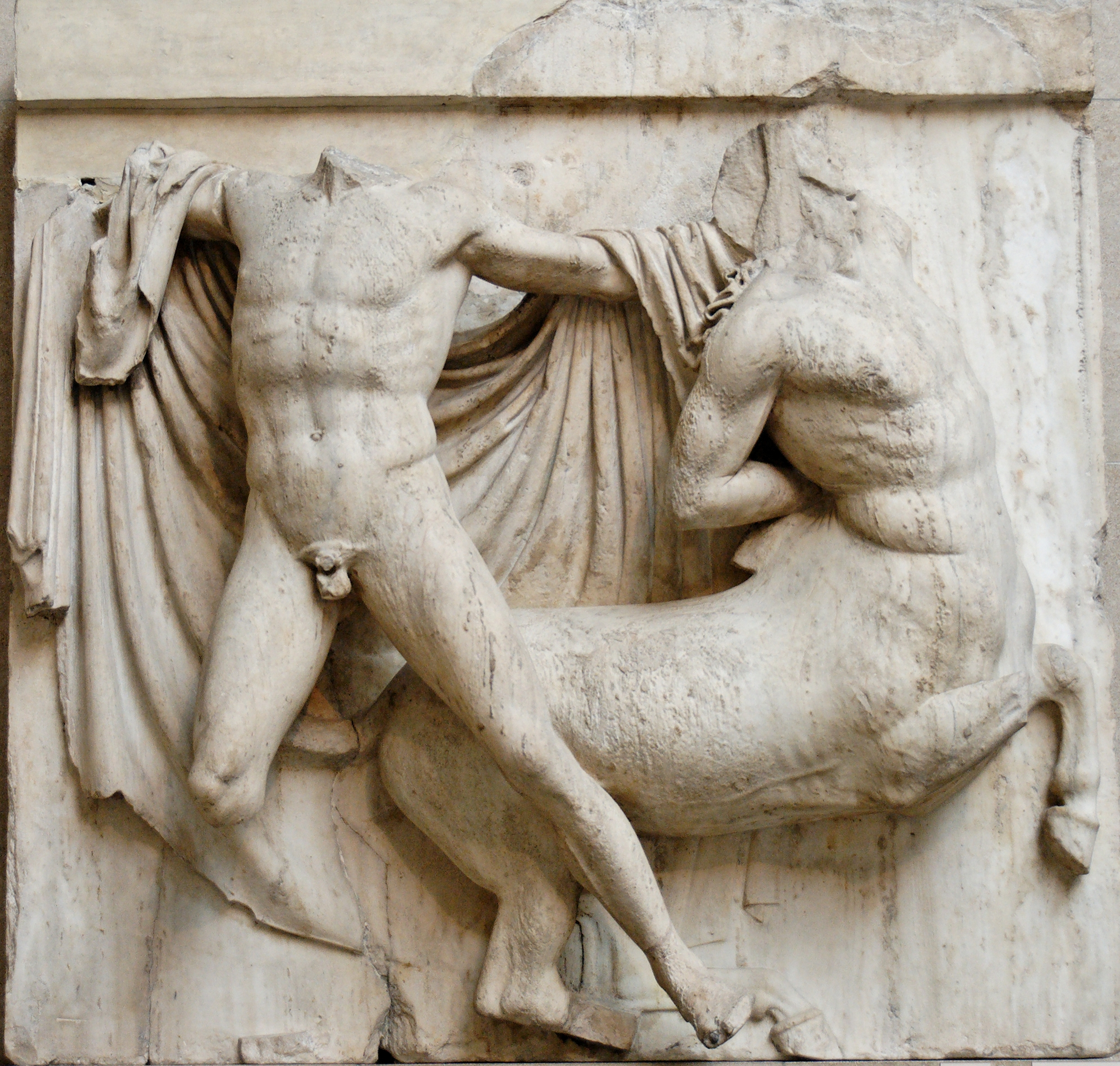
A metope from the Parthenon's south facade in the British Museum, photographed in 2007. Jenkins cites this as an example of a sculpture which received relatively little cleaning.

In 1950, Cesare Brandi, an Italian conservator, wrote in the journal of the Instituto centrale del restauro (of which he was the director) that the pre-war cleaning had constituted "a ferocious skinning", which had removed thin plaster coatings which he believed to have been applied to the sculptures in antiquity. (Note: Brandi 1950, quoted in Jenkins 2001, pp. 12–13.) Brandi considered that none of the pediment figures, apart from Figure G from the east pediment, had been cleaned, but that most of the frieze and all of the metopes had been. Jenkins writes that Brandi's claims about the cleaning work done, particularly that sharp tools were used to rework the surfaces, lack evidence, and that modern scholars generally reject the idea that the marbles were ever coated in plaster. At the time, Brandi's article attracted little response.

In 1956, Plenderleith wrote a textbook on the conservation of ancient objects; he did not mention the 1937–1938 cleaning of the marbles directly, but did write that "the user of copper chisels ... [is] quite unsuitable for museum work where ... patina, an important feature of the specimen, must be preserved at all costs". (Note: Plenderleith 1956, p. 314, quoted in Payne 2021, p. 143.) Plenderleith's overall assessment of the damage was severe, though Jenkins and Payne consider that this was partly a result of his frustration that the masons had failed to follow the more conservative systems of cleaning he had previously instituted.

Since 1970, the British Museum has coated the marbles in a layer of wax; a 2000 article noted that critics of the museum had considered this an effort to hide the damage of the 1930s cleaning, though Jenkins stated on the museum's behalf that, by smoothing the visible surface of the marbles, it would if anything exaggerate its effect. Jenkins wrote in 1999 that the 1930s cleaning "has always been regretted but, like others before it, represents a part of the history of the sculptures". He argued that it is natural for objects in museums to change over time, and that exposure to the open air in Athens had had a more deleterious effect on those sculptures not taken by Elgin than pollution and cleaning had had on those in London. In his 1987 book on the restitution of the Elgin Marbles, Christopher Hitchens cited the episode as a counter-argument to the retentionist claim that the marbles had been safer in London than they would have been in Athens.

Oddy called the cleaning a "lamentable episode" in 2002. In 2021, Payne called it "an infamous episode not just in the history of the Parthenon sculptures but in the history and evolution of conservation". In their 2003 study, Galanos and Doganis blamed the cleaning for destroying evidence of ancient polychromy, finishing and toolmarks, as well as for exposing the underlying surface to deterioration and for altering the aesthetic appearance of the sculptures, particularly regarding the figures' movement and facial expressions. Jenkins called the cleaning "as the vernacular has it, a 'cock-up'" in 2001, but argued that the scandal was the unauthorised nature of the cleaning and the ensuing cover-up rather than any physical damage done by it. In support of this argument, he cites the lack of criticism voiced towards the cleaning, under the American School of Classical Studies at Athens in the 1950s, of the Hephaisteion in the Athenian Agora: the Hephaisteion operation employed harder steel chisels, after Plenderleith suggested the use of copper chisels and carborundum, and yet attracted little criticism.

==== 1999 British Museum conference ====
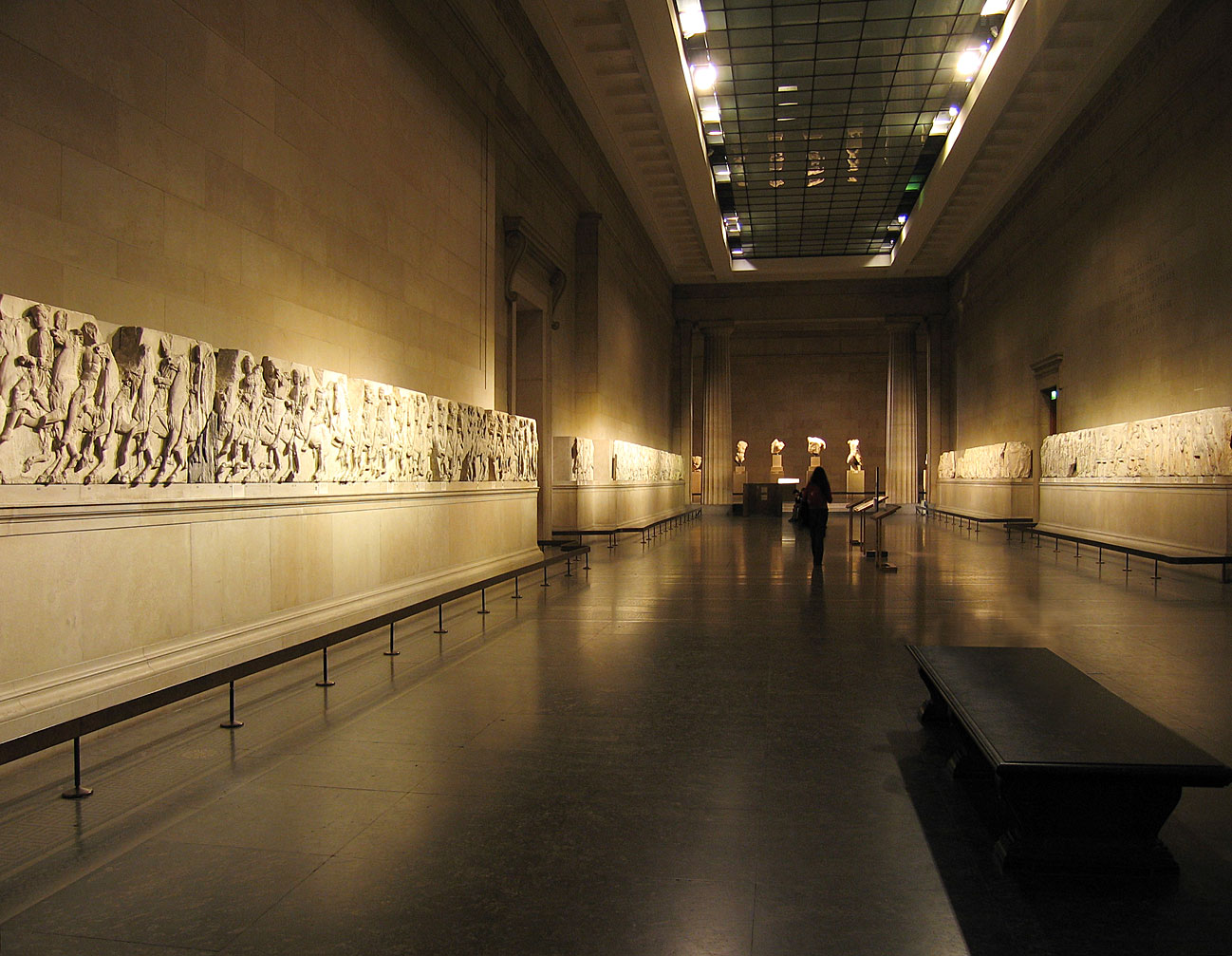
The Duveen Gallery, showing marbles from the Parthenon, in 2005

In Cook's 1983 report, he recommended that the trustees inspect the statues personally before deciding whether to release information about the 1930s cleaning; he also suggested finding the tools used and considering whether to inform the public about them. The episode was not mentioned in the official publications written under the auspices of the British Museum between the 1930s and 1997; it was also not discussed in works written by academics with the museum's co-operation.

The cleaning scandal returned to popular attention via St Clair's re-investigation of it in the late 1990s. In the third (1998) edition of his book on the Parthenon sculptures, Lord Elgin and the Marbles, St Clair published the results of his investigation, based upon his study of the primary documentary evidence in 1996. In response, the museum's director, Robert Anderson, described the cleaning as "a tragedy", as did Dyfri Williams, the keeper of Greek and Roman Antiquities. An article by Peter Stothard, editor of The Times, called the cleaning "a key flaw in [the] case" for the British Museum's possession of the marbles, and urged the museum to admit its mistakes and fully disclose the evidence of what happened.

Chris Smith, the Secretary of State for Culture, Media and Sport, announced on 17 June 1998 that the British Museum would hold an academic conference on the cleaning. It took place on 30 November and 1 December 1999. It was organised by Jenkins and included twenty-four scholars from the Greek Archaeological Service, Britain, Germany and the United States, with the aim of investigating the state of the marbles' patina prior to the 1930s and the effect of Duveen's cleaning upon the sculptures. (Note: Beard 2010, p. 171; "Museum admits 'scandal' of Elgin Marbles". BBC News. 1 December 1999.. For Jenkins's role, see Burnett 2020.) In the course of the conference, Jenkins spoke on the museum's behalf. He described the cleaning as "heavy-handed" and the ensuing coverup as "a scandal". However, he also claimed that the damage was less than alleged by the Greek delegates and government, and that other Parthenon sculptures retained in Athens had suffered more severe damage from cleaning and pollution. The Greek minister of culture, Elisavet Papazoi, called the 1930s affair an act of "barbarous cleaning". Alekkos Matzi, a member of the Greek delegation, described the damage as "a catastrophe", joking that one horse's head had been damaged such that "the distortion is so extreme that it appears Roman". Boardman opined that it was an aesthetic benefit that the orange-brown patina had disappeared, and that it looked "hideous" in photographs taken before the cleaning: his comment was met with gasps from the audience.

Reviewing the conference for The Art Newspaper, Martin Bailey judged that it had remained "almost completely civil", barring the last few minutes, in which the Greek journalist Nikos Papadakis accused the British delegates of deviating from the conference's stated purpose to argue for the retention of the Elgin Marbles in London. It was originally determined that the conference proceedings would be published, but the eventual volume included only a report by Jenkins, alongside transcripts of primary documentation: it did not include the papers delivered by the Greek delegates, which the museum said were mostly submitted too late for publication, or that of St Clair, an earlier form of which had appeared in the International Journal of Cultural Property shortly beforehand. St Clair called the omissions an "institutional cover-up". (Note: Bailey 2002. The volume is Jenkins 2001.)

== Bibliography ==
- Anderson, Robert G. W. (2012). "British Museum, London: Institutionalizing Enlightenment". In Paul, Carole (ed.). The First Modern Museums of Art: The Birth of an Institution in 18th- and Early-19th-century Europe. Los Angeles: J. Paul Getty Museum. pp. 47–72. ISBN 978-1-60606-120-6.
- Bailey, Martin (1 January 2000). "Parthenon Marbles Conference Report: Academic Interchange Remains Almost Completely Civil at the British Museum". The Art Newspaper – via Archive.ph.
- Bailey, Martin (31 March 2002). "British Museum's Findings on the Parthenon Marbles Cleaning Incident Said to Lack Key Details". The Art Newspaper.
- Beard, Mary (2000). The Invention of Jane Harrison. Cambridge, Mass.: Harvard University Press. ISBN 0-674-00212-1.
- Beard, Mary (2010). The Parthenon. London: Profile Books. ISBN 978-1-84668-349-7.
- Behrman, Samuel Nathaniel (27 October 1951). "The Days of Duveen: The Silent Men". The New Yorker.
- Beresford, James M. (2016). "The Caryatids in the New Acropolis Museum: Out of Sight, Out of Light, Out of Mind". Journal of Conservation and Museum Studies. 14 (1): 1–16. doi:10.5334/jcms.130.
- Boardman, John (2000). "The Elgin Marbles: Matters of Fact and Opinion". International Journal of Cultural Property. 9 (2): 233–262. doi:10.1017/S0940739100771074.
- Boulton, James T. (2004). Introduction. The Cambridge Edition of the Works of D. H. Lawrence. By Lawrence, D. H. Boulton, James T. (ed.). Vol. 2: Late Essays and Articles. Cambridge University Press. pp. xix–xxxvii. ISBN 0-521-58431-0.
- Brandi, Cesare (1950). "Nota sui marmi del Partenone" [Notes on the Marbles from the Parthenon]. Bolletino del'Istituto di Restauro (in Italian). 3–4: 3–8.
- Burnett, Andrew (15 December 2020). "Ian Jenkins Obituary". The Guardian.
- Challis, Debbie (2009). "Charles Newton and the British Museum: Articulating a Science of Ancient Art in the Nineteenth Century". In Adlam, Carol; Simpson, Juliet (eds.). Critical Exchange: Art Criticism of the Eighteenth and Nineteenth Centuries in Russia and Western Europe. Cultural Interactions: Studies in the Relationship Between the Arts. Vol. 12. Bern: Peter Lang. pp. 153–166. ISBN 978-3-03911-556-3.
- Cohen, Beth (2015). "Displaying Greek and Roman Art in Modern Museums". In Marconi, Clemente (ed.). The Oxford Handbook of Greek and Roman Art and Architecture. Oxford University Press. pp. 473–498. ISBN 978-0-19-978330-4.
- Colla, Elliott (2007). Conflicted Antiquities: Egyptology, Egyptomania, Egyptian Modernity. Durham and London: Duke University Press. ISBN 978-0-8223-3975-5.
- Dodwell, Edward (1819). A Classical and Topographical Tour Through Greece, During the Years 1801, 1805, and 1806. Vol. 1. London: Rodwell and Martin. OCLC 987771142.
- Elam, Caroline (February 2000). "Editorial: Scratching the Surface". The Burlington Magazine. 142 (1163): 75. JSTOR 888664.
- Galanos, Amerimni; Doganis, Yanna (2003). "The Remnants of the Epidermis on the Parthenon: A Valuable Analytical Tools for Assessing Condition". Studies in Conservation. 48 (1): 3–16. JSTOR 1506819.
- Hitchins, Christopher (1998) [1987]. The Elgin Marbles: Should They Be Returned to Greece?. London and New York: Verso. ISBN 1-85984-220-8 – via Archive.org.
- Holloway, R. Ross (1978). Art and Coinage in Magna Graecia. Bellinzona: Edizioni Arte e Moneta. ISBN 0-8390-0206-8.
- Hood, Rachel (1998). Faces of Archaeology in Greece: Caricatures by Piet de Jong. Oxford: Leopard's Head. ISBN 0-904920-38-0.
- Isler-Kerényi, Cornelia (2015). Dionysos in Classical Athens: An Understanding Through Images. Religions in the Graeco-Roman World. Vol. 181. Translated by Beerens, Anna. Leiden: Brill. ISBN 978-90-04-27011-4. JSTOR 10.1163/j.ctv2gjwzj9.
- Jenkins, Ian (30 June 1998). "Historian William St Clair's Account of Parthenon Marbles Malpractice at British Museum Revives Lobby Calling for Their Return". The Art Newspaper – via Archive.today.
- Jenkins, Ian (1999). "'Sir, They Are Scrubbing the Elgin Marbles!' – Some Controversial Cleanings of the Parthenon Sculptures". Minerva. 10 (6): 43–45.
- Jenkins, Ian (2001). Cleaning and Controversy: The Parthenon Sculptures 1811–1939. British Museum Research Publications. Vol. 146. London: British Museum. ISBN 0-86159-146-1. ISSN 0142-4815.
- Jenkins, Ian; Middleton, Andrew P. (1988). "Paint on the Parthenon Sculptures: Part Two – Scientific Aspects". Annual of the British School at Athens. 83: 183–207. doi:10.1017/S0068245400020712. JSTOR 30103116.
- Jenkins, Tiffany (2016). Keeping their Marbles: How the Treasures of the Past Ended Up in Museums, and Why They Should Stay There. Oxford University Press. ISBN 978-0-19-965759-9.
- Kennedy, Maev (1 December 1999). "Mutual Attacks Mar Elgin Marbles Debate". The Guardian.
- Lowenthal, David (2006). "Archives, Heritage, and History". In Blouin, Francis X.; Rosenberg, William G. (eds.). Archives, Documentation, and Institutions of Social Memory: Essays from the Sawyer Seminar. Ann Arbor: University of Michigan Press. pp. 193–206. ISBN 978-0-472-03270-9. JSTOR 10.3998/mpub.93171.23.
- Neer, Richard (2012). "Sacrificing Stones: On Some Sculpture, Mostly Athenian". In Faraone, Christopher A.; Naiden, F. S. (eds.). Greek and Roman Animal Sacrifice: Ancient Victims, Modern Observers. Cambridge University Press. pp. 99–119. doi:10.1017/CBO9780511894602.010. ISBN 978-1-107-01112-0.
- Oddy, W. Andrew (2002). "The Conservation of Marble Sculptures in the British Museum before 1975". Studies in Conservation. 47 (3): 145–154. JSTOR 1506868.
- Oddy, W. Andrew (8 September 2023). "Restoring the Reputation of British Museum Curators". The Guardian.
- Palagia, Olga (2022). The Pediments of the Parthenon. Leiden: Brill. ISBN 978-90-04-52741-6.
- Payne, Emma M. (2021). Casting the Parthenon Sculptures: From the Eighteenth Century to the Digital Age. London and New York: Bloomsbury Academic. ISBN 978-1-350-12034-1.
- Plenderleith, Harold (1934). The Preservation of Antiquities. London: Museums Association. OCLC 5519431.
- Plenderleith, Harold (1956). The Conservation of Antiquities and Works of Art: Treatment, Repair and Restoration. Oxford University Press. OCLC 5084392 – via Internet Archive.
- Ruiz, Christina (1 January 2000). "How the British Museum's Maintenance Procedures for the Parthenon Marbles Have Changed". The Art Newspaper – via Archive.ph.
- Savoy, Bénédicte (2022). Africa's Struggle for Its Art: History of a Postcolonial Defeat. Princeton University Press. ISBN 978-0-691-23591-2.
- Shapland, Andrew (2025). The Emergence of Aegean Prehistory. Elements in The Aegean Bronze Age. Cambridge University Press. doi:10.1017/9781009342889. ISBN 978-1-009-34288-9.
- Smith, A. H. (1916). "Lord Elgin and His Collection". The Journal of Hellenic Studies. 36: 163–372. JSTOR 10.2307/625773.
- Snodgrass, Anthony (2005). "The Parthenon Marbles as an Architectural Issue". Medelhavsmuseet: Focus on the Mediterranean. 2: 151–156.
- Sparkes, Brian A. (2006). "Charles Martin Robertson 1911–2004" (PDF). Proceedings of the British Academy. 138: 321–335.
- Stahn, Carsten (2023). Confronting Colonial Objects: Histories, Legalities, and Access to Culture. Oxford University Press. ISBN 978-0-19-286812-1.
- St Clair, William (1998). Lord Elgin and the Marbles: The Controversial History of the Parthenon Sculptures (3rd ed.). Oxford University Press. ISBN 0-19-288053-5.
- St Clair, William (1999). "The Elgin Marbles: Questions of Stewardship and Accountability". International Journal of Cultural Property. 8 (2): 391–521. doi:10.1017/S0940739199770803.
- Stothard, Peter (5 November 1999). "A Chance for Peace in the Chisellers' War". The Times. p. 27.
- Subotić, Jelena (2025). "The 19th-Century 'Antiquities Rush' and the International Competition for Cultural Status". Review of International Studies. 51 (6): 938–953. doi:10.1017/S0260210525100892.
- Verri, Giovanni; Granger-Taylor, Hero; Jenkins, Ian; Sweek, Tracey; Weglowska, Katarzyna; Wootton, William Thomas (2023). "The Goddess' New Clothes: The Carving and Polychromy of the Parthenon Sculptures". Antiquity. 97 (395): 1173–1192. doi:10.15184/aqy.2023.130.
- Wilson, David M. (2002). The British Museum: A History. London: British Museum Press. ISBN 0-7141-2764-7.
- Zaccarini, Matteo (2018). "The Athens of the North? Scotland's National Struggle for the Parthenon, Its Marbles, and Identity". Aevum. 92 (1): 179–196. JSTOR 26497064.
