= Charles Radcliff =

Charles Radcliff (or Radcliffe or Radclyffe) may refer to:

- Charles Radclyffe (or Radcliff, 1693–1746), English nobleman and Jacobite, titular 5th Earl of Derwentwater
- Charles Walter Radclyffe (1817–1903), English artist
- Charles Bland Radcliffe (1822–1889), English medic
- Charles Radcliff, Sheriff of Pickaway County, Ohio, USA 1931–1961 (father of Dwight Radcliff)
- Charles Radcliffe (born 1941), English cultural critic and political activist

== See also ==
- Charles Redcliffe, South African politician
