= William Radclyffe =

English painter

- Born: 20 October 1783; Birmingham
- Died: 29 December 1855; Birmingham
- Occupation: Engraver
- Children: Charles Radclyffe, Edward Radclyffe, William Radclyffe
- Relatives: Thomas Radclyffe

William Radclyffe (20 October 1783 – 29 December 1855) was an English engraver and painter.

Born in Birmingham and self-educated, he was apprenticed to a letter engraver and studied drawing under Joseph Barber with his cousin John Pye. Both planned to move to London when their apprenticeships were complete in 1801, but Radclyffe remained in Birmingham for financial reasons and set up as an engraver and copperplate printer.

In 1817 he took in his younger brother Thomas Radclyffe, who also was or became an engraver, and they eventually set up business as W & T Radclyffe.

Radclyffe became well known as an engraver of landscapes, making prints after David Cox, J. M. W. Turner and Peter De Wint and illustrating numerous works of travel literature. He taught James Tibbits Willmore.

Radclyffe's son was the painter Charles Walter Radclyffe.
