= Henry Revell =

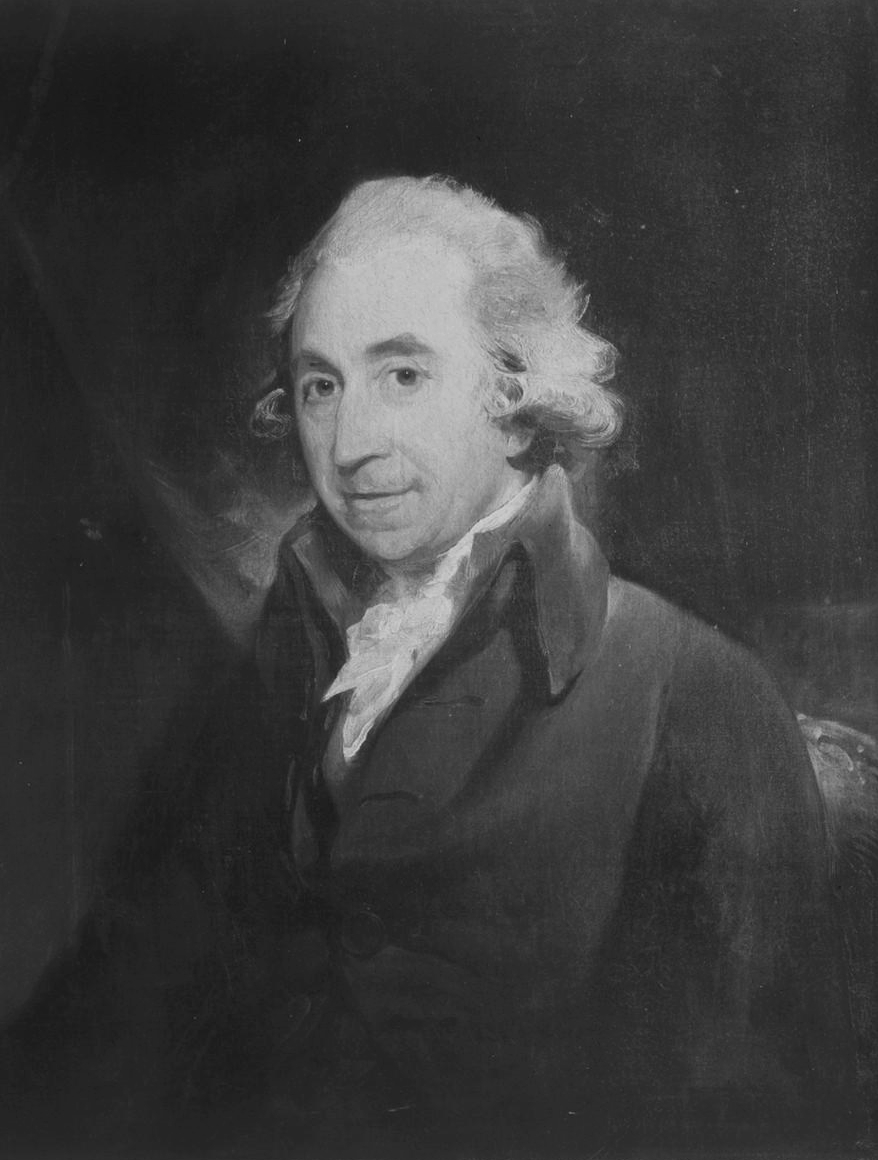
Portrait of Henry Revell

Henry Revell (1767–1847) was a London radical of the Reform Bill period, a leading figure in the National Political Union.

== Early life ==
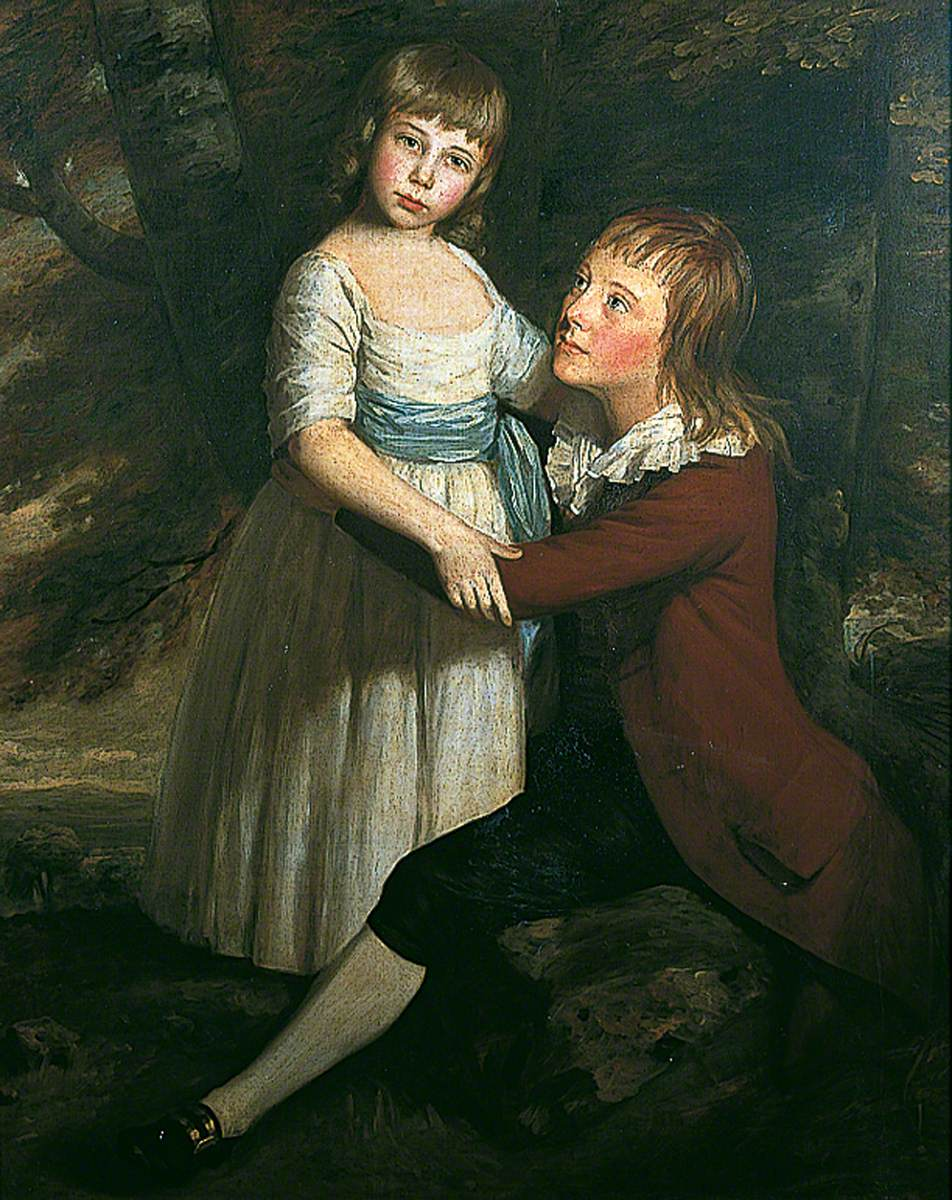
Double portrait by John Opie, Henry Read as a boy with his sister Frances

He was the eldest son of John Read of Walthamstow, known in early life as Henry Read. He changed his surname to Revell in 1809. It was his mother Elizabeth's maiden name, and the change was to comply with the will of her sister Frances. His father, who also spelled his surname Reade, was son of the Bristol merchant James Read, and died in 1823 at age 90.

When the parish of St Pancras adopted the changes offered by the Vestries Act 1831, Revell and Thomas Murphy were two of the new vestrymen elected to the administrative vestry, the effective body of local government for the parish. At a poor rate payers' meeting on 1 October, attended by 2,000 people according to Cobbett's Register, he was voted into the chair, declaring that poor rates should be withheld until those paying them controlled how they were spent.

At the height of the reform agitation of 1832, Revell was drawn into the orbit of the radical organiser Francis Place. With Charles Buller and Edward Wakefield, he was a powerful orator in Place's camp, and the group impressed James Mill, so bridging the gap between Philosophical Radicals and those from the working class. When the National Political Union was set up, Murphy and Revell, and some of their supporters, came higher in the initial poll than Place.

Place had contacts, he said, with 13 "military officers" of rank at least major, who would act in favour of the reform legislation then stalled in parliament, if the King made them ministers. Revell is identified as one of those officers ("apparently") by Place's biographer Graham Wallas. In what was civil disobedience, Revell went to an NPU branch meeting at Bethnal Green to take the chair, as the reformers made efforts to gain parish-level support in London.

In autumn 1832, Murphy made a strong attack on Henry Brougham and the Grey administration's Irish policy, at a meeting chaired by Revell. John Stuart Mill was less impressed than his father James had been: he wrote to his friend John Taylor that he hoped the French republican visitors Jules Bastide and Hippolyte Dussard who had been there could meet NPU members more representative of their "men of action" than the "Revells and Murphys". William Lockey Harle, a solicitor and radical, saw Revell speak at the Crown and Anchor, Strand at an 1833 meeting for Daniel O'Connell, who was late. Harle called Revell "an honest and intelligent reformer", but "certainly not a magnificent orator".

The address of Major Henry Revell was given as 28 Burton Crescent in 1842. He died on 2 October 1847 in Notting Hill, aged 79, the Gentleman's Magazine naming him as Henry Read Revell.

Revell associated with the classical scholars Edmund Henry Barker and Richard Porson.

== Family ==
Revell's wife Louisa died in 1817. Of his daughters:

- Louisa, the eldest daughter, married in 1820 George West of the Royal Engineers. He died in the wreck of HMS Firefly off Belize, in February 1835. It followed a court case of January that year, Peters v Grote, concerning the financing of asylum care for Louisa with William Wastell, while West held a position in Jamaica. Peters, Revell's brother-in-law (see below) with his family were on one side, George and Louisa, Revell's son Thomas (see below) and George Grote on the other. It became a leading case on desertion by a husband.
- Frances (Fanny), the second daughter, married in 1828 Pascual de Gayangos y Arce; they had met in Paris. Their daughter Emilia de Gayangos, a noted beauty, married Juan Facundo Riaño. Her full name is given as Francisca Whitney Revell.
- Anne Matilda, the third daughter, married in 1830 Redmond Hervey Morres. He was known also as Redmond Hervey De Montmorency.
- Emily, the fourth daughter, married in 1830 John Handcock Low, and was mother of Charles Rathbone Low.
- Maria married in 1838 Edward Radclyffe (1809–1863)

His eldest son the Rev. Henry Revell died in 1832, at age 32. Thomas Backhouse Revell (b. 1802/3) matriculated at Trinity College, Cambridge in 1825. Other sons were Joseph Leverton Revell and John Raithby Revell.

Revell's sister Frances married John Godfrey Peters, a cavalry officer. He was of German extraction, originally with the Hanoverian Army. He came to prominence as a riding instructor, and was on good terms with both the Prince Regent and Frederick, Duke of York and Albany. He joined the 9th Light Dragoons, made a reputation with a military exercise called the "Pimlico Exercise", and became Superintendent of the British Cavalry Riding School. Revell's son-in-law Redmond Hervey De Montmorency, also of the 9th Light Dragoons, quarrelled seriously with Peters over lance drill, and published a book in 1820 setting out his own views.
