= John Forsdyke =

British museum director (1883–1979)

Sir Edgar John Forsdyke KCB (12 September 1883 – 3 December 1979) was Director and Principal Librarian of the British Museum from 1936 to 1950. Under his tenure, an attempt was made to clean the Elgin Marbles in 1937, which lasted until 1938 and resulted in damage to the collection due to the "misguided efforts" of the restoration team to whitewash certain marbles under the belief they were originally white in colour.

== Early life ==
Forsdyke was born in Bermondsey, London on 12 September 1883 to and Mary Eliza (nee Sainsbury) and Frederick Palmer Forsdyke. His father was a commercial traveller. He won a place at Watford Grammar and then a scholarship to Christ's Hospital in Hereford and then another scholarship which allowed him to attend Keble College, Oxford where he studied the classics.

== Career ==
He joined the British Museum as an Assistant Keeper in 1907. Forsdyke contributed to Arthur Evans' work Palace of Minos at Knossos. He became editor of the Journal of Hellenic Studies in 1912 and held the post until 1923. He served in the Royal Field Artillery in the British military as a captain between 1914 and 1919 in France, Macedonia, and Spain.

Following his military service, he returned to the British Museum. At Evan’s suggestion he finished excavating the cemetery near Knossos in Crete in 1927.

After serving as Keeper of Greek and Roman Antiquities at the British Museum from 1932 to 1936, he was appointed Director and Principal Librarian in 1936. At the time of his appointment he was only the second person who was not a librarian to hold the post of Principal Librarian in the history of the museum.

As tensions with Nazi Germany developed and it appeared that war may be imminent Forsdyke came to the view that with the likelihood of far worse air-raids than that experienced in World War I that the museum had to make preparations to remove its most valuable items to secure locations. Following the Munich crisis Forsdyke ordered 3,300 No-Nail Boxes and stored them in the basement of Duveen Gallery. At the same time he began identifying and securing suitable locations. As a result the museum was able to quickly begin relocating selected items on 24 August 1939, (a mere day after the Home Secretary advised them to do so), to secure basements, country houses, Aldwych Underground station, the National Library of Wales and Westwood Quarry in Wiltshire.

Following the end of the war, Forsdyke invested resources in microfilming the museum’s collection, both to make it available to a wider scholarly community and as a preservation tool.

He retired from his leadership of the British Museum in 1950.

He died on 3 December 1979 at home of bronchitis exacerbated by heart disease.

== Honours ==
He was appointed a Knight Commander of the Order of the Bath (KCB) in 1937, and was an Honorary Fellow of Keble College.

== Personal life ==
In 1910 at the age of 26 he married 42 year old widow Frances Beatrice Mumford Gifford. She died in 1938. The couple had no children.

He married concert violinist Anna Amadea Leonie Dea Gombrich (1905-1994), the sister of art historian Ernst Gombrich in 1942. The couple had two daughters when Forsdyke was in his sixties.
