= Ian Jenkins (curator) =

British curator (1953–2020)

Ian Jenkins OBE FSA
- Photographed at the British School at Athens
- Born: 18 February 1953; Chippenham, Wiltshire, England
- Died: 28 November 2020 (aged 67)
- Occupation: Curator
- Employer: British Museum

Academic background
- Education: University of Bristol; University of London (PhD)

Ian Dennis Jenkins OBE FSA (18 February 1953 – 28 November 2020) was a Senior Curator at the British Museum who was an expert on ancient Greece and specialised in ancient Greek sculpture. Jenkins published a number of books and more than a hundred articles. He led the British Museum's excavations at Cnidus and was involved in the debate over the ownership of the Elgin Marbles.

== Career ==
Ian Jenkins was born in Chippenham in Wiltshire, to the civil servant Ivor Jenkins and his wife Lena (née Swatton). He was educated at The Chippenham School and the University of Bristol, where he read Ancient Greek with Archaeology and Ancient History. After serving an apprenticeship as a stonemason in Bath, he joined the British Museum in 1978. He received his PhD from the University of London in 1990.

Jenkins had responsibility for the ancient Greek collections at the British Museum. At the Museum, he wrote his doctorate on the collection history and reception of the British Museum's Egyptian, Assyrian and Classical sculptures. His thesis was published by the British Museum in 1992 as Archaeologists and Aesthetes in the Sculpture Galleries of the British Museum 1800–1939.

Jenkins divided his research interests between Greek architecture and sculpture and the history of the reception of Classical art and architecture in the modern era. His work on the history of collecting included studies on the Paper Museum of Cassiano dal Pozzo and the archive of documents and drawings compiled by the 18th-century antiquary and collector, Charles Townley, which came into the museum's possession in the 1990s.

Jenkins curated many of the permanent galleries at the British Museum including Greek and Roman Life (Room 69), Hellenistic World (Room 22), the Parthenon galleries (Room 18), and the display of the Bassae sculptures in the British Museum. He was a major participant in the team responsible for the Enlightenment Gallery (Room 1). He co-curated the special exhibition Vases and Volcanoes in 1996, on the life and collection of Sir William Hamilton and his circle.

In 1998, Jenkins worked on finding ways to make the Parthenon Frieze accessible to visually impaired people. He lectured about this and the new archaeological insights that the project had brought about when he was the Samuel Henry Kress lecturer in ancient art for the Archaeological Institute of America in the same year. He was simultaneously a visiting professor at Cornell University.

In 2008, Jenkins co-curated an exhibition about the ancient Olympic games for the 2008 Summer Olympics in Beijing. The exhibition visited Shanghai and Hong Kong. This exhibition was to form the basis of the British Museum's current international touring exhibition, The Body Beautiful in Ancient Greece.

Jenkins led the British Museum's excavations at Cnidus (Knidos) in Turkey, a site visited by various scholars in the 19th century. Published reports have appeared in Anatolian Archaeology, most recently in 2006.

Jenkins was appointed an Officer of the Order of the British Empire (OBE) in the 2010 Birthday Honours. He was a Fellow of the Society of Antiquaries of London (elected 5 May 1988) and a corresponding member of the German Archaeological Institute and Archaeological Institute of America.

He died on 28 November 2020 at the age of 67.

== Elgin Marbles debate ==
In 1999, Jenkins was asked to comment over a debate concerning the "damage" done to the Elgin Marbles. He was quoted as saying: "The British Museum is not infallible, it is not the Pope. Its history has been a series of good intentions marred by the occasional cock-up, and the 1930s cleaning was such a cock-up." Jenkins conceded that cleaning conducted in the 1930s by the Museum was a mistake, but also claimed that the damage was being exaggerated for political reasons.

== Bibliography ==
- Jenkins, Ian (1992), Archaeologists & aesthetes : in the sculpture galleries of the British Museum 1800-1939, Published for the Trustees of the British Museum by the British Museum Press, ISBN 978-0-7141-1299-2, OCLC 27204051
- Jenkins, Ian (1994), The Parthenon frieze, University of Texas Press, ISBN 978-0-292-74038-9, OCLC 31638838
- Jenkins, Ian; Sloan, Kim (1996), Vases & volcanoes : Sir William Hamilton and his collection, Published for the Trustees of the British Museum by the British Museum Press, ISBN 978-0-7141-1766-9, OCLC 34962506
- Bird, Susan; Jenkins, Ian; Levi, Fabio (1998), Second sight of the Parthenon frieze, British Museum Press in association with Silvio Zamorani editore, ISBN 978-0-7141-2217-5, OCLC 41011470
- Jenkins, Ian; Museum, British (2001), Cleaning and controversy : the Parthenon sculptures, 1811-1939, Occasional paper (British Museum), no. 146., British Museum, ISBN 978-0-86159-146-6, OCLC 50397999 pdf 3 MB
- Jenkins, Ian (2006), Greek architecture and its sculpture, Harvard University Press, ISBN 978-0-674-02388-8
- Jenkins, Ian; Kerslake, Ivor; Hubbard, Dudley (2007), The Parthenon sculptures in the British Museum, British Museum, ISBN 978-0-7141-2261-8, OCLC 144596317
- The Lion of Knidos, British Museum, 2008
- Jenkins, Ian; Hubbard, Dudley; Dodd, Stephen; Turner, Victoria (2009), The Greek Body, J. Paul Getty Museum, ISBN 978-1-60606-002-5, OCLC 456174077
