= Pascual de Gayangos y Arce =

Spanish scholar and orientalist (1809–1897)

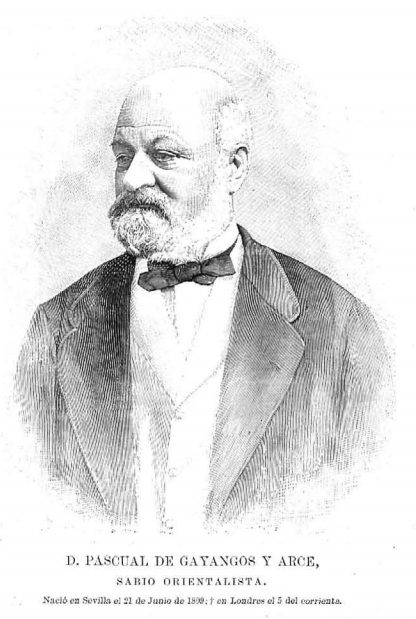

Pascual de Gayangos y Arce (June 21, 1809 – October 4, 1897) was a Spanish scholar and orientalist.

== Life ==
Born in Seville, Gayangos was the son of Brigadier José de Gayangos, intendente of Zacatecas, in New Spain (Mexico). After completing his primary education in Madrid, at the age of thirteen, he was sent to school at Pont-le-Voy near Blois. There, he began the study of Arabic in the École spéciale des Langues orientales of Paris under Silvestre de Sacy.

Gayangos visited Britain, where he married Frances, daughter of Henry Revell, in 1828. He then obtained a post in the Spanish treasury, and was transferred to the foreign office as translator in 1833.

In 1837, Gayangos returned to Britain, wrote extensively in British periodicals, like The Athenaeum, and in publications of the SDUK, like The Penny Cyclopaedia for the Diffusion of Useful Knowledge and The Biographical Dictionary. In these years he completed his magnum opus as an arabist: the translation, for the Royal Asiatic Society, of the first part of Al Makkari's biography of Ibn al-Khatib. The edition was entitled the History of the Mohammedan Dynasties in Spain and appeared in two volumes in 1840 and 1843 . While in England, he entered in the Holland House circle, where he made the acquaintance of George Ticknor, to whom he was very helpful. In 1843, he returned to Spain as professor of Arabic at the University of Madrid, a post he held until 1871. In 1861, the American Philosophical Society elected him an international Member. He entered in politics in 1881, when he was made director of public instruction. He resigned on being elected senator for the district of Huelva.

His latter years were spent in cataloguing the Spanish manuscripts in the British Museum; he had previously continued Gustav Adolf Bergenroth's catalogue of the manuscripts relating to the negotiations between England and Spain in the Simancas archives. His best-known original work is his lengthy introduction on Spanish romances of chivalry in volume 40 (Libros de caballerías, vol. 1, 1857) of Adolfo Rivadeneyra's Biblioteca de autores españoles. This was the first survey of Spanish chivalric romances.

Gayangos died in London.
