= Charles Walter Radclyffe =

English painter

Charles Walter Radclyffe (17 January 1817 – 2 February 1903) was a British watercolourist, printmaker and lithographer. The son of artist William Radclyffe (1783–1855), he was elected into the Birmingham Society of Artists in 1846.

Radclyffe was a key part of Birmingham Art Societies, exhibiting 454 works between 1846 and 1902. His work was mostly typographical landscapes and urban scenes, including his works for Perry Hall and Blenheim Palace in the mid-1800s.

== Personal life ==
Radclyffe married twice: first to Ann Benbow on 13 June 1840 at St Mary, Warwick, with whom he had a son and a daughter; and then to Ann Walton Ellis on 19 February 1852 at St John, Upper Holloway, who was mother to their two daughters and four sons.

Charles Walter Radclyffe died at 66 Hagley Road, Edgbaston on 2 June 1903, and was buried in the family grave at Old Edgbaston Churchyard on 5 February.
