= Edward Radclyffe (1809–1863) =

British engraver

Edward Radclyffe (1809–1863) was a British engraver, known from his illustrations of Thomas Roscoe's The London & Birmingham railway from 1839 in cooperation with George Dodgson Callow.

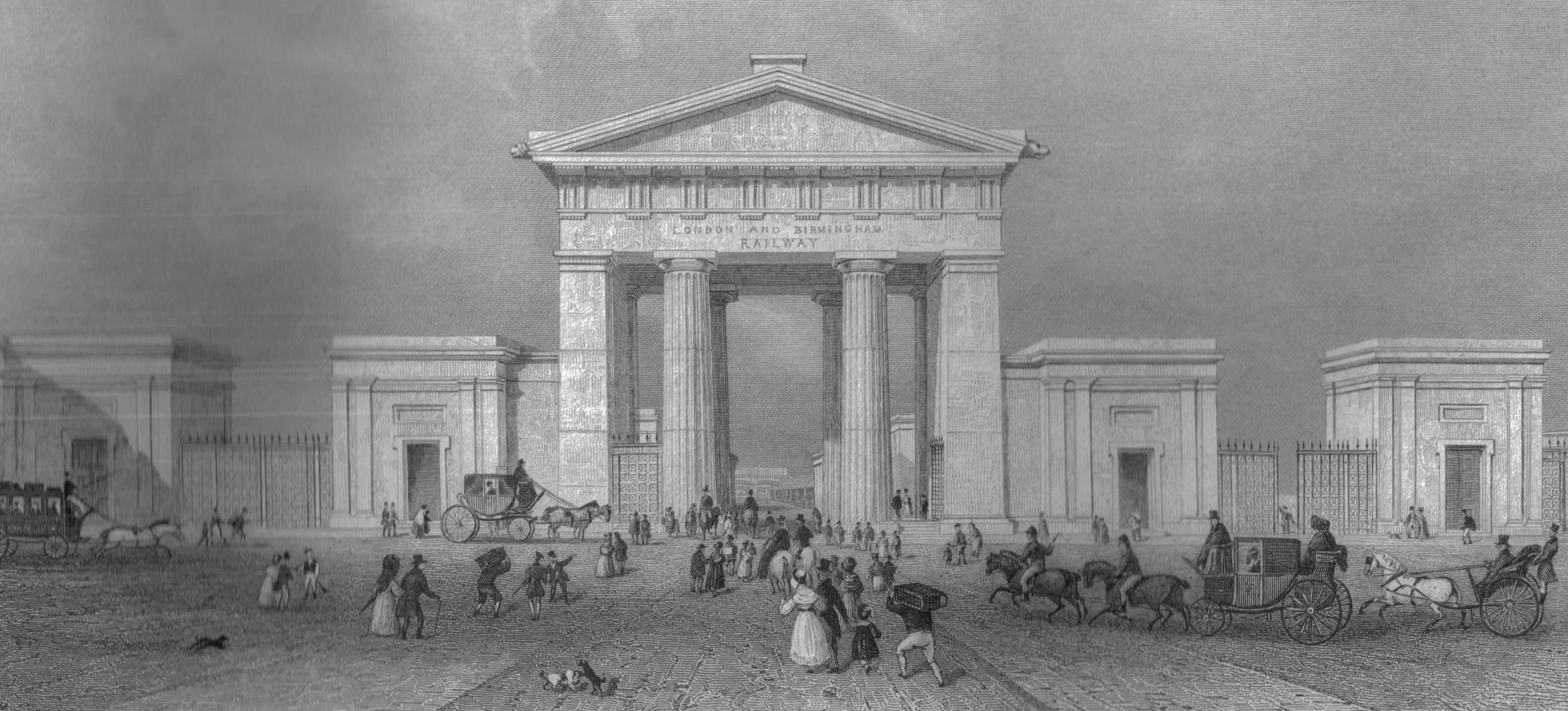
Entrance to Euston Station by Radclyffe, 1838

== Biography ==
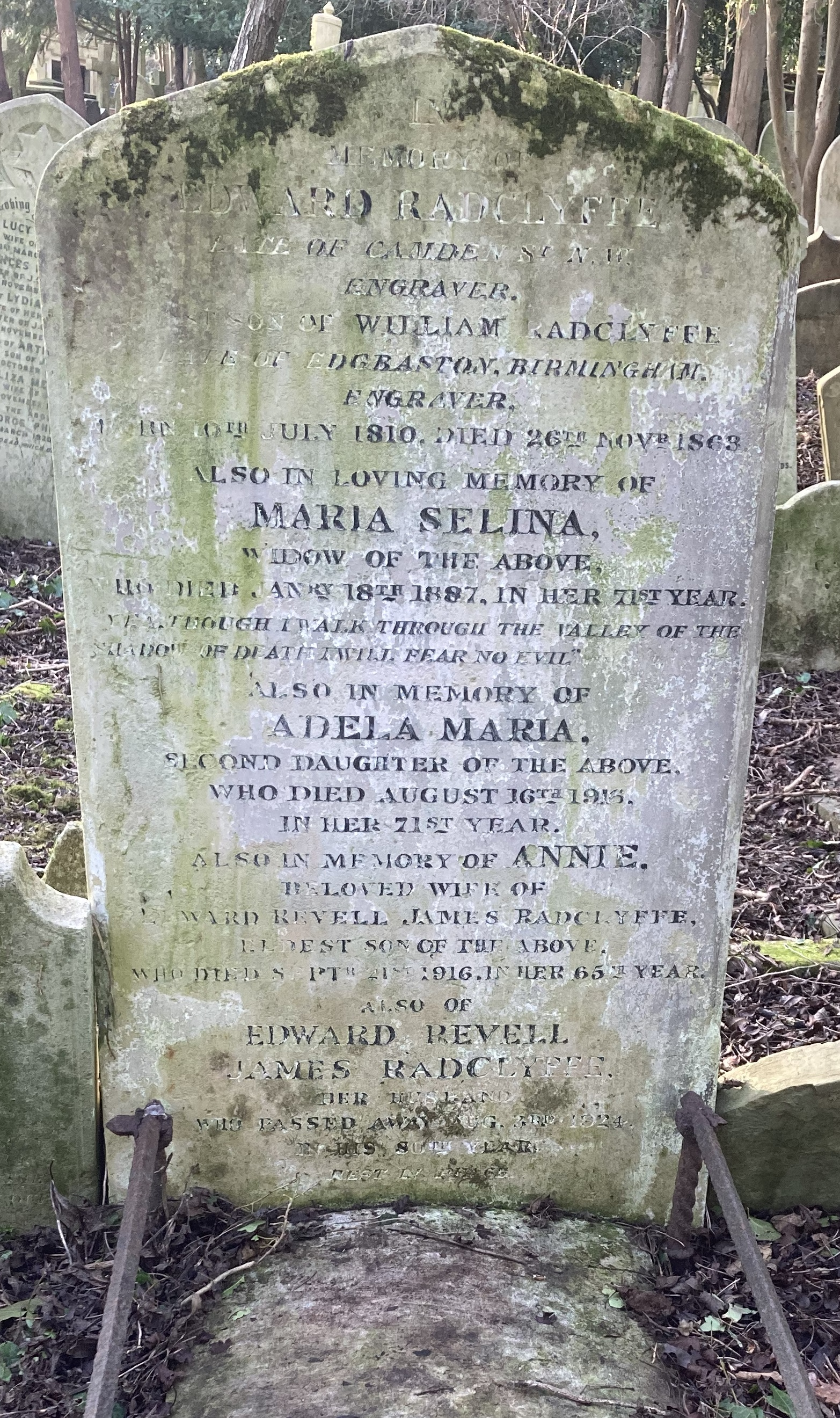
Grave of Edward Radclyffe in Highgate Cemetery

Born in 1809 in Birmingham, where he was educated under his father William Radclyffe and Vincent Barber, and followed his father's profession as an engraver.

He received medals for engraving at the ages of fifteen and seventeen from the Society of Arts in London, and in his twenty-first year removed to the metropolis. He was largely employed in engraving for the ‘annuals,’ then so popular, and for The Art Journal and other works. He also was employed for many years by the admiralty in engraving charts.

Like his father, Radclyffe was a close friend of David Cox, and published several etchings and engravings from his works. He planned a "liber studiorum" in imitation of J. M. W. Turner's ‘Liber Studiorum’, but had executed only three etchings for this at the time of his death in November 1863. At the end of his life he was living in Clifton Villas, Camden, London (now Cliff Villas) and was a close neighbour of Orlando Jewitt.

He was buried on the western side of Highgate Cemetery, and his wife, son, daughter and daughter-in-law were later buried with him. He had married, in 1838, Maria, daughter of Major Henry Revell of Round Oak, Englefield Green, Surrey.

== Gallery ==
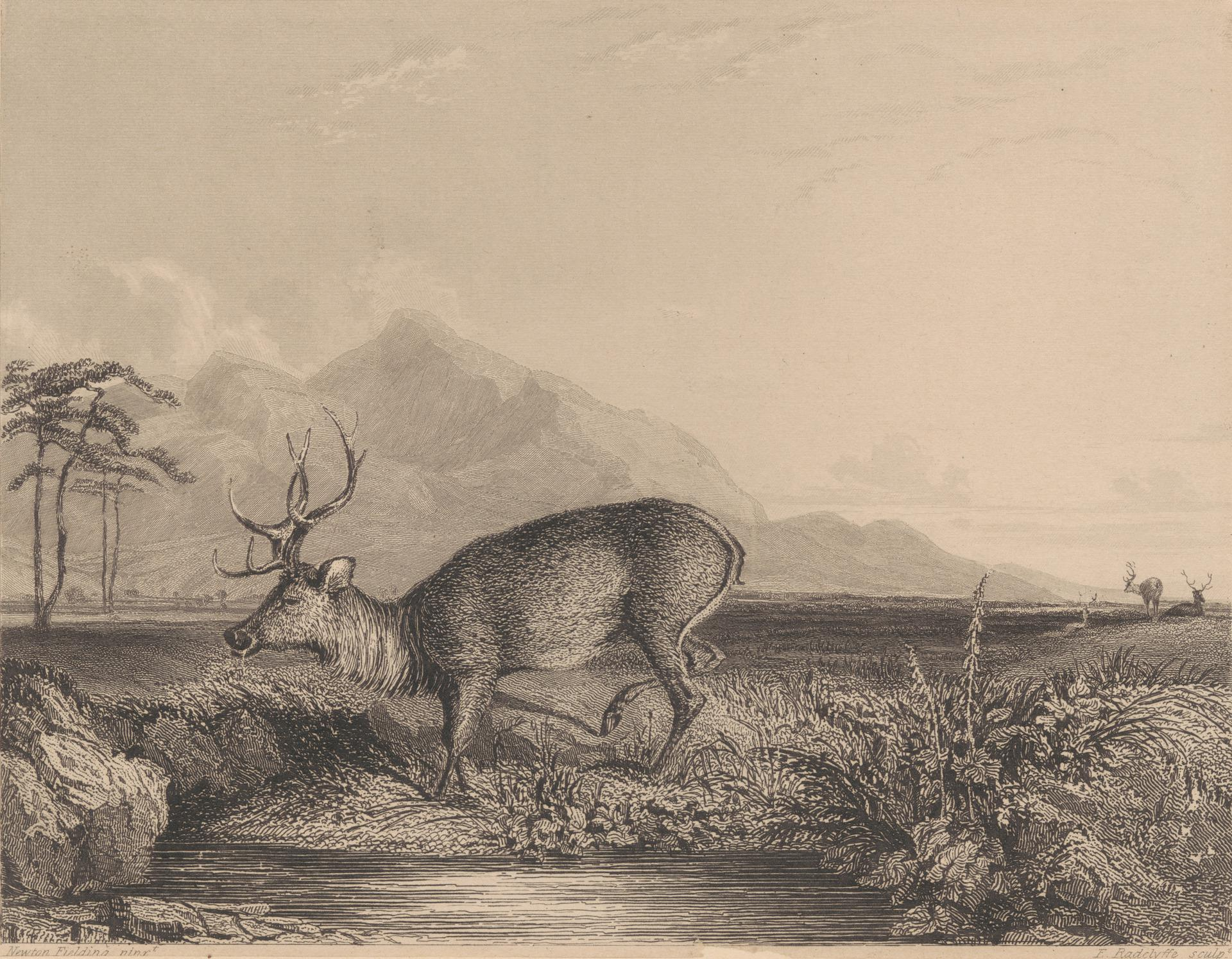
Edward Radclyffe, Stag at the Edge of a Pond, Yale Center for British Art

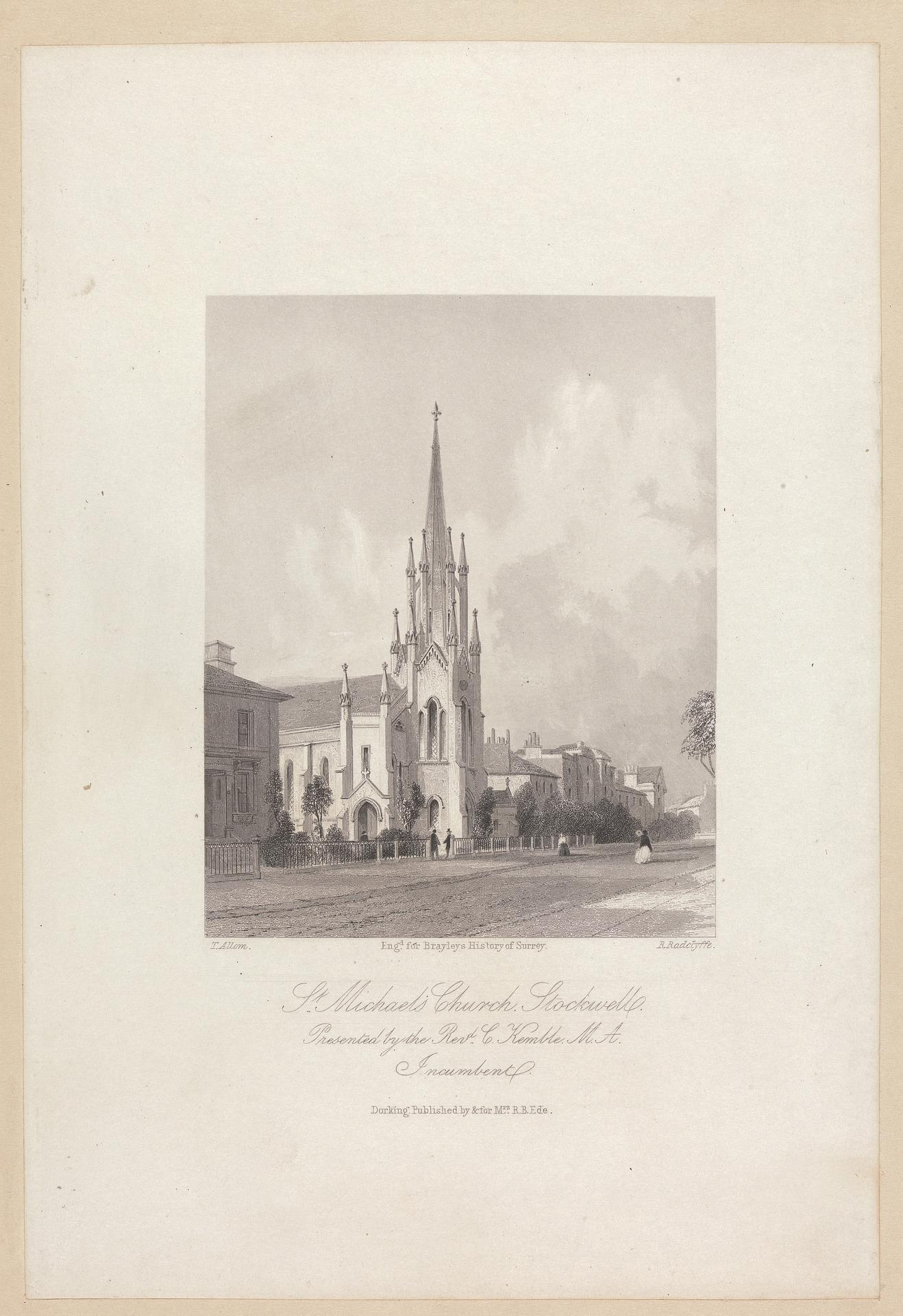
Edward Radclyffe, St Michael's Church, Stockwell, Yale Center for British Art

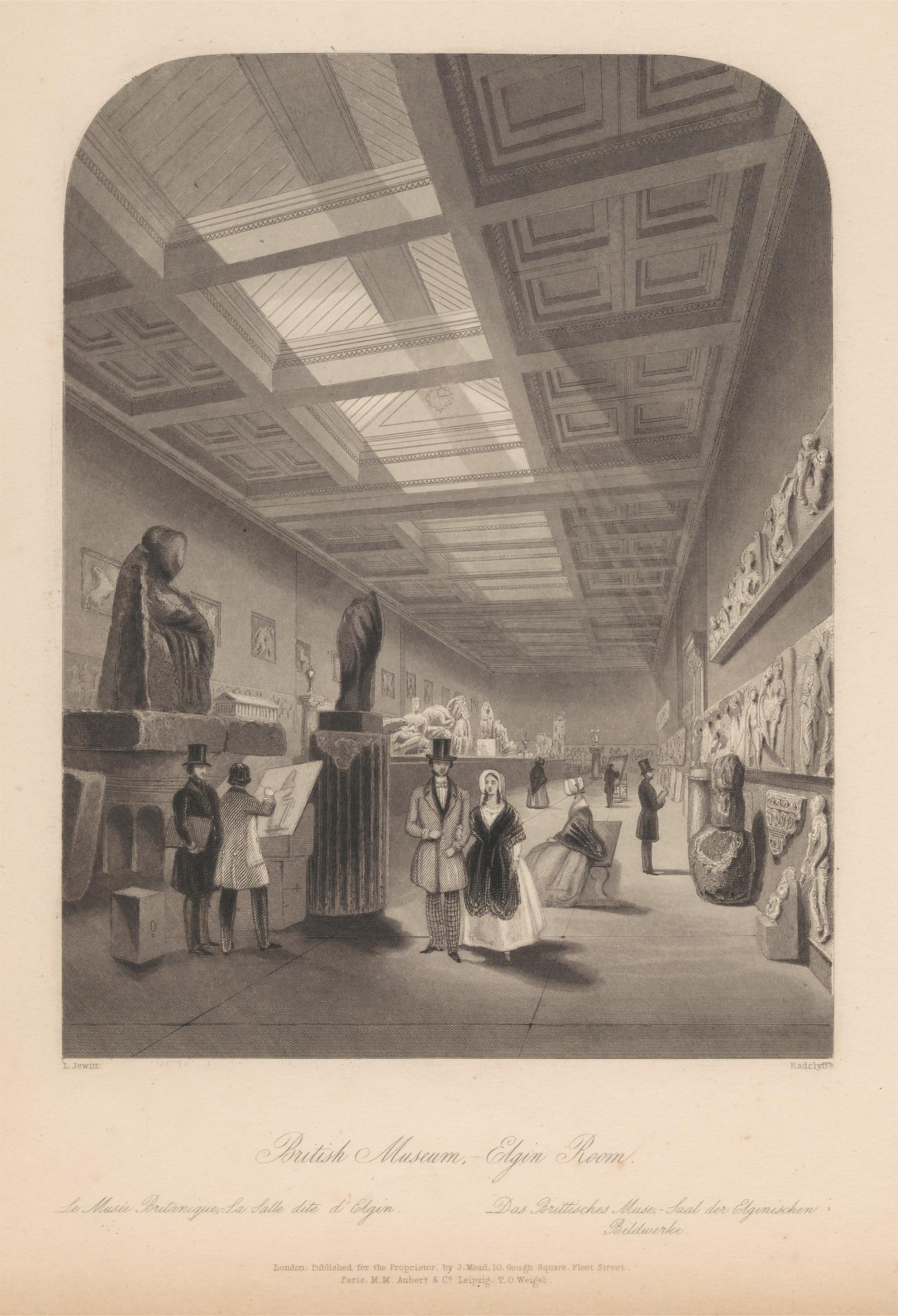
Edward Radclyffe, British Museum, Elgin Room, Yale Center for British Art

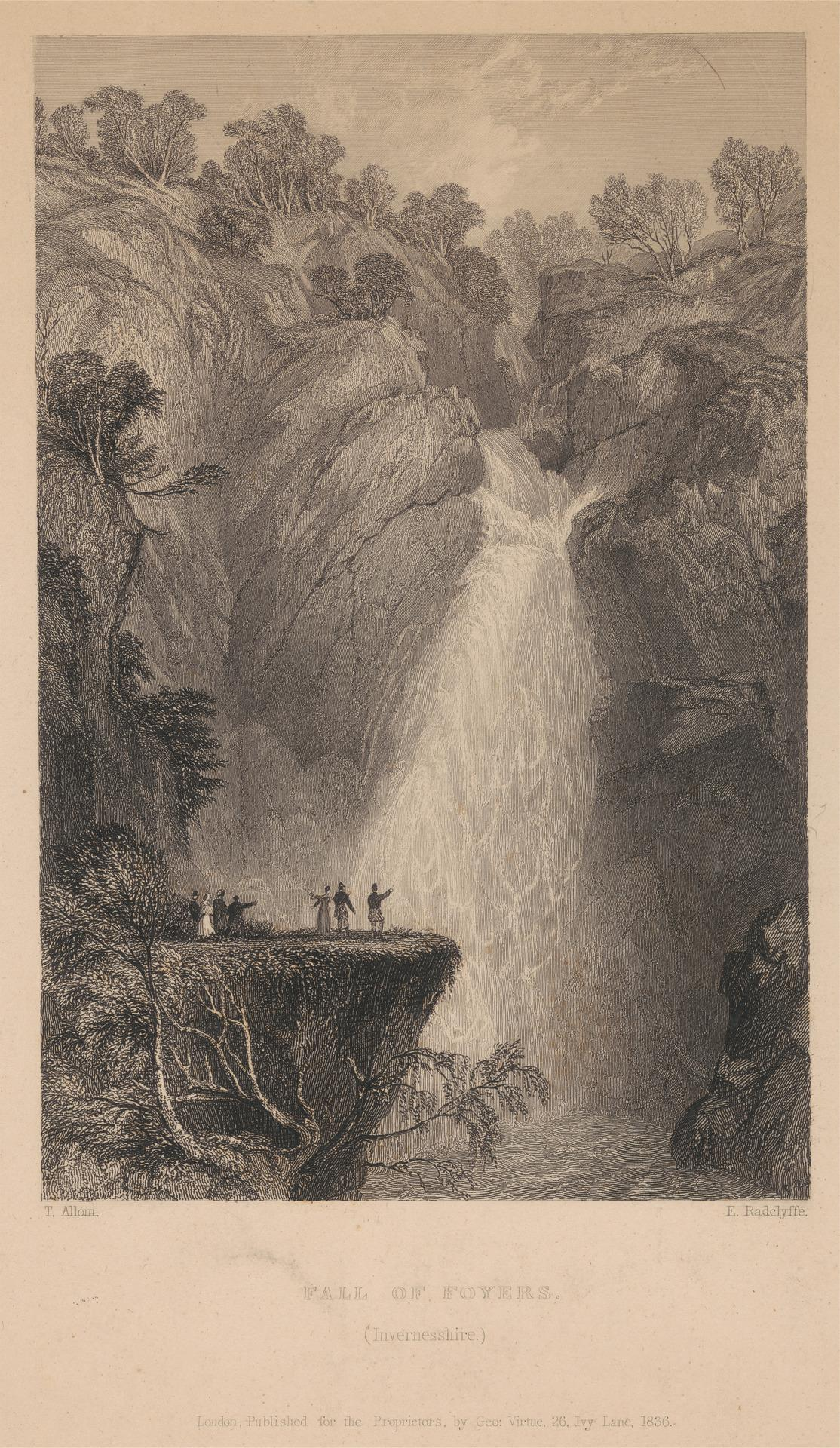
Edward Radclyffe, Fall of Foyers, Invernesshire, Yale Center for British Art

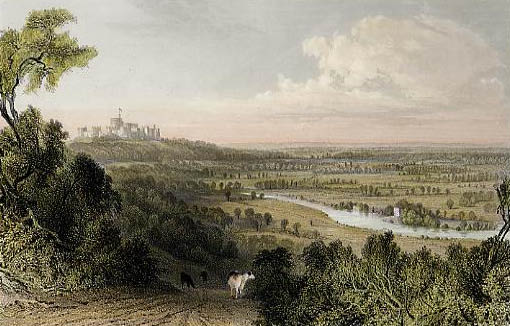
View from Coopers Hill, with Runnemede and Windsor Castle engraved by E.Radclyffe after a picture by Thomas Allom published in 1842

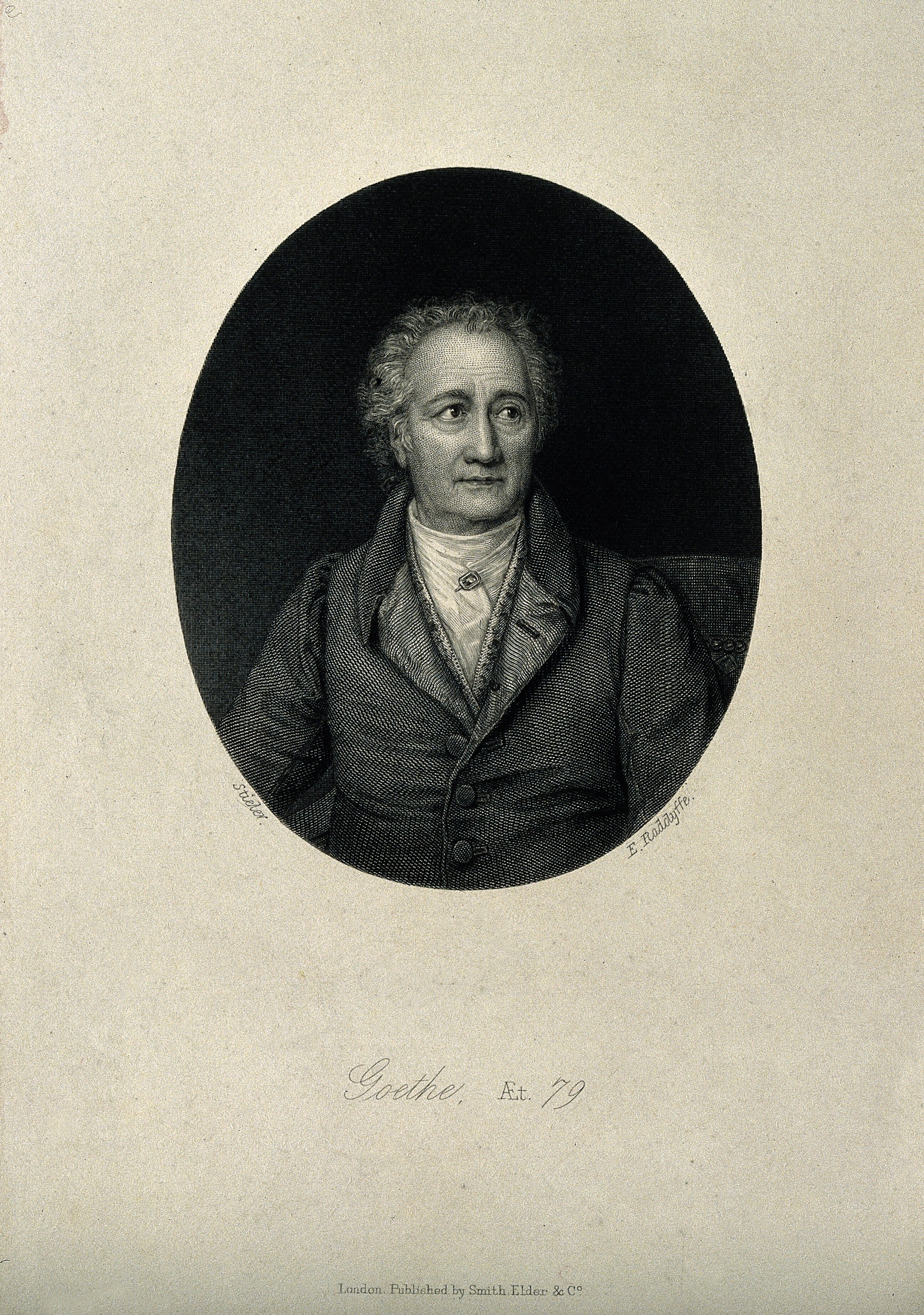
Johann Wolfgang von Goethe, a line engraving by Edward Radclyffe, Wellcome

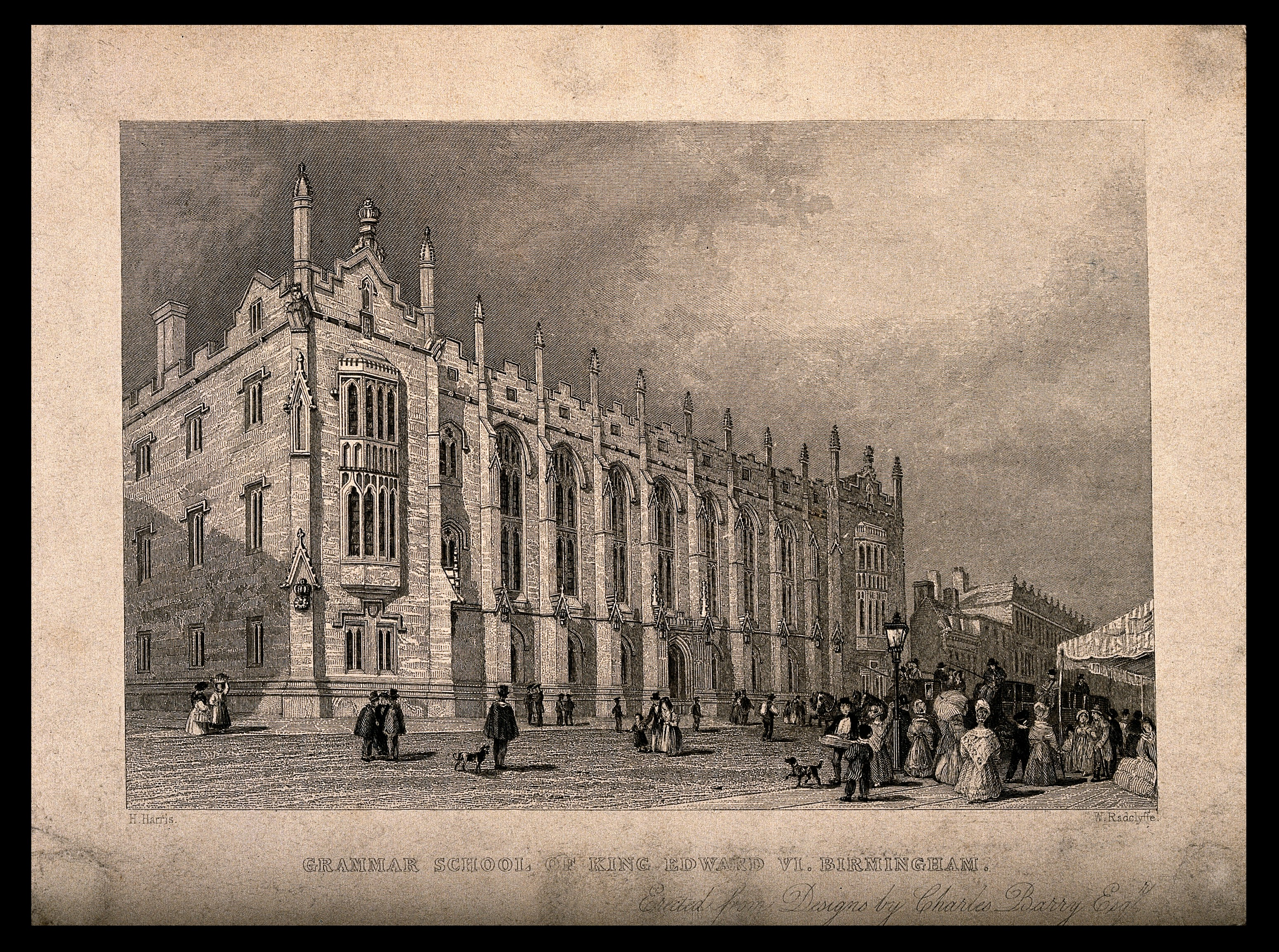
King Edward VI's grammar school, Birmingham, stipple engraving by Edward Radclyffe after H. Harris after Sir C. Barry
