= Frank Barlow Osborn =

English architect

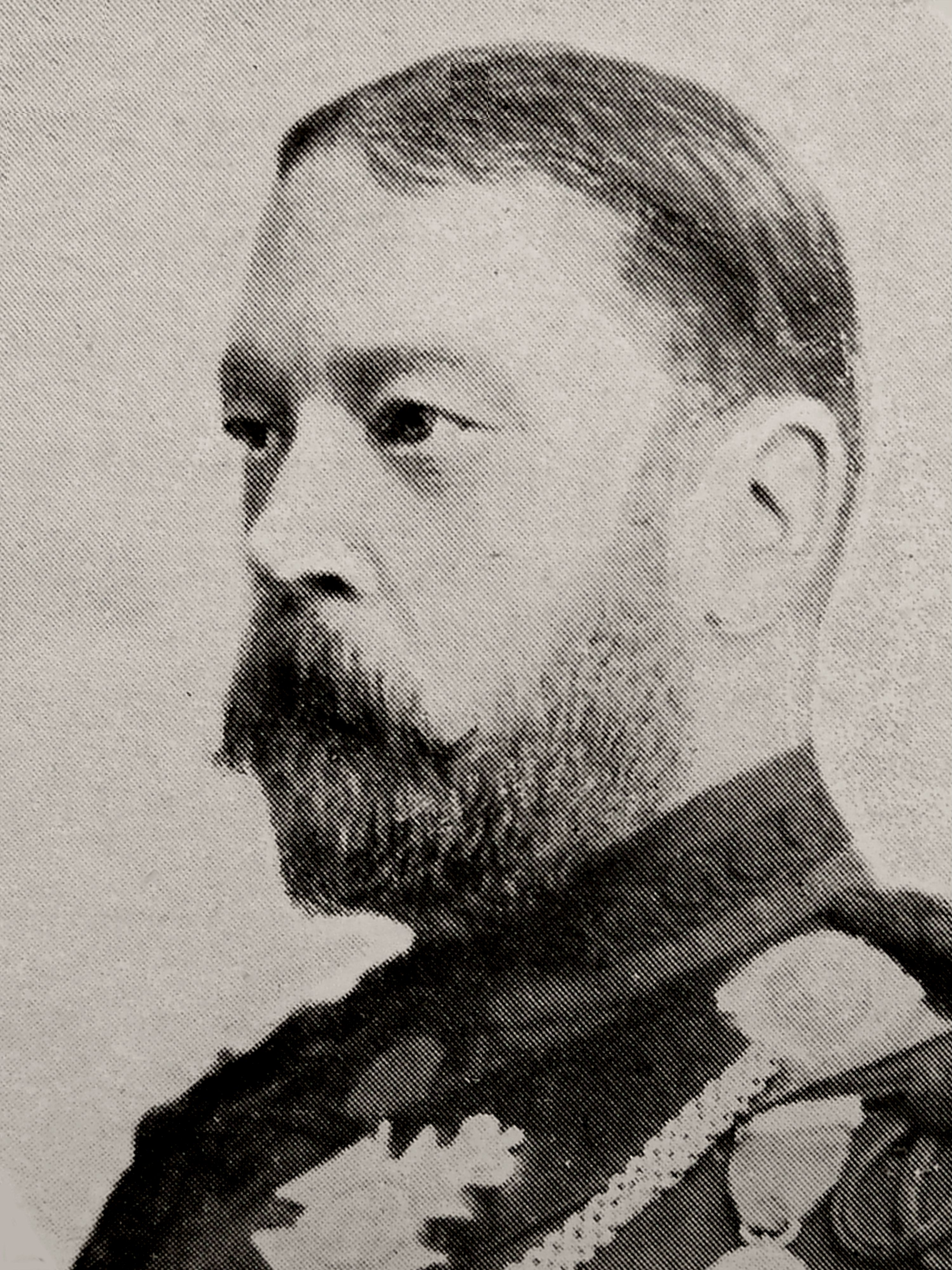
Osborn, in 1900

Frank Barlow Osborn FRIBA (June 1840 - 6 April 1907) was an English architect practising in Birmingham.

== Personal life ==
Osborn's father was Councillor Thomas Osborn. Frank Barlow was born in his father's home town of Edgbaston, Birmingham, Warwickshire, and attended the Old Proprietary School at Five Ways. On 15 May 1867 he married Mary Ann "Marian" Whitehead, youngest daughter of Edward Bickerton Whitehead of Bristnall, Warwickshire. They had three children, and lived at 205 or 222 Hagley Road, Birmingham. Marian died at home on 13 April 1874, aged 33 years. On 2 September 1880 at the Holy Trinity Church, Lickey, near Bromsgrove, Osborn married his second wife, Marion Georgina, the youngest daughter of solicitor Nathaniel Taynton of Lincoln's Inn.

Osborn died suddenly at the Union Club, Birmingham, on 6 April 1907. He left £21,911 (equivalent to £2,278,938.09 in 2025). His funeral and burial service were held at St Peter's Church, Harborne, on 9 April 1907. A "very large gathering" of friends, military colleagues, and hospital board members assembled in the church and at the graveside, the service being taken by the archdeacons of Birmingham and Aston. The choir sang the Nunc Dimittis as the coffin was carried from the church to the graveside. There were wreaths on the coffin, whose nameplate said, "Frank Barlow Osborn, F.R.I.B.A., died 6th April 1907, aged 66". Osborn was buried in his family's vault on the churchyard's east side.

== Career ==
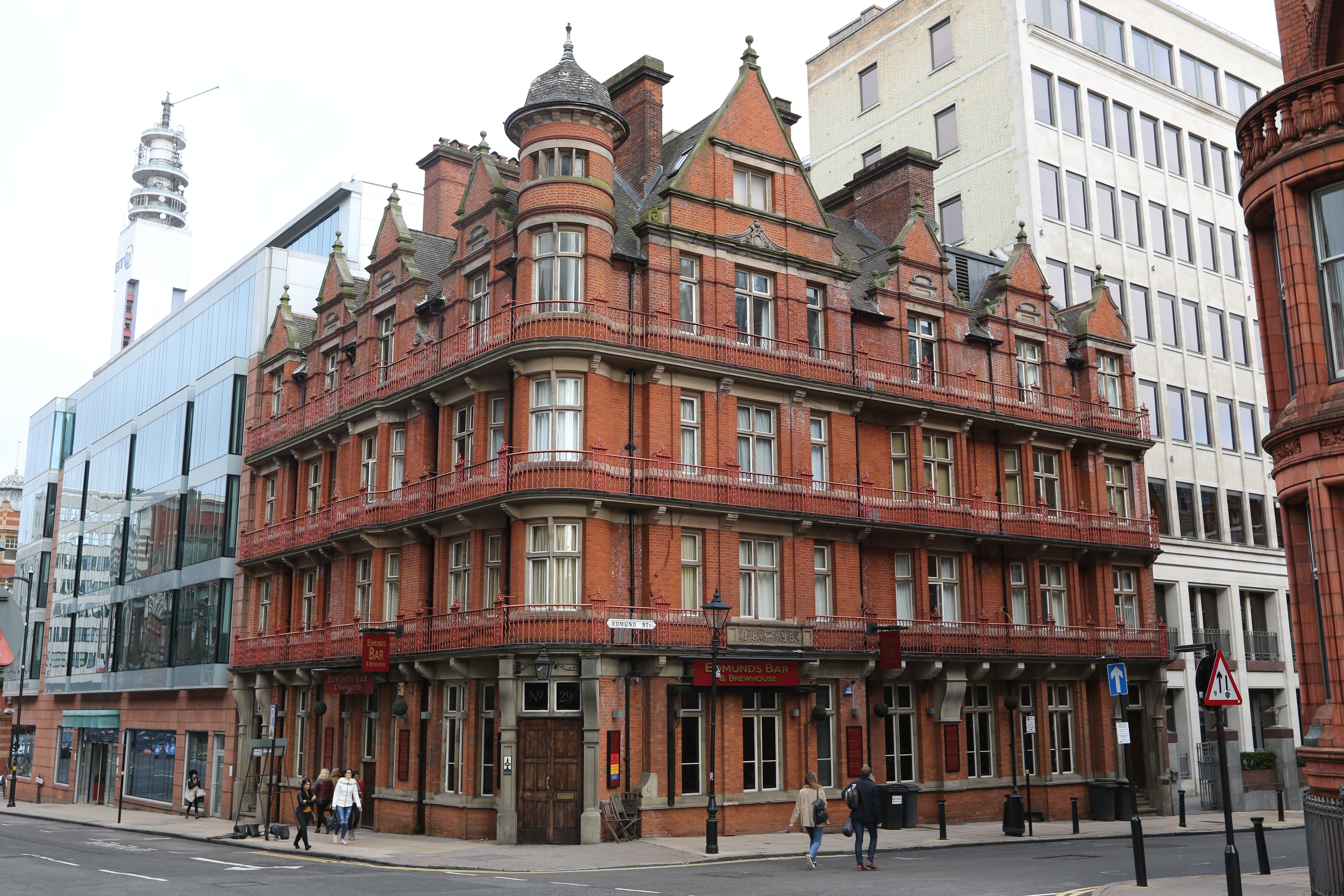
106-110 Edmund Street, Birmingham of 1895 for W.M. Smythe Solicitors' offices

After leaving school, Osborn was articled to Charles Edge before transferring to Samuel Sanders Teulon in London. He left London and established his own practice in 1864 or 1865, and formed a partnership with Alfred Reading in 1876. This partnership ended in 1891. At that time, his practice was located at 13 Bennett's Hill, Birmingham.

One of Osborn's pupils was Thomas Walter Francis Newton, who later entered practice with Alfred Edward Cheatle and designed numerous Arts and Crafts-style buildings in Birmingham.

== Institution and awards ==
Osborn was appointed a Fellow of the Royal Institute of British Architects in 1872. He was a member of the Union Club, Birmingham, for some years. Having designed the volunteer headquarters for the Royal Warwickshire and South Staffordshire regiments, he joined the 1st VB Royal Warwickshire Regiment in 1859. By 1872 he was a lieutenant, and at his retirement in 1893 he was gazetted Hon. Lieutenant-Colonel and awarded an Army Long Service and Good Conduct Medal and Volunteer Officers' Decoration (VD), conferred by Queen Victoria. He served as president of the Birmingham Institute of Architects. He was involved with the archaeological section of the Midland Institute, being one of its first secretaries. Osborn was a long-serving member of the management board at Birmingham General Hospital, and when he died, its members attended his funeral.

== Works ==
- Palm House, Birmingham Botanical Gardens 1871
- Bandstand, Birmingham Botanical Gardens 1873
- St Margaret’s Church, Ladywood 1875
- St Cyprian's Church, Hay Mills 1878
- St Catherine's Church, Nechells 1878
- 8-10 Tenby Street, Birmingham 1879
- Black Lion Pub, Essex Street, Birmingham 1879 - 1880
- The Clock House (also Fockbury House), Fockbury, Worcestershire 1880 (expansion)
- Thorp Street drill hall, Birmingham 1881
- Theatre Royal, Regent Grove, Leamington Spa 1882
- Buildings for the Smithfield Market, Jamaica Row to Moat Lane 1883
- Rectory for St Philip’s Church, Temple Row, Birmingham 1886
- Conservative Club, Temple Row, Birmingham 1886
- Edgbaston Vestry Hall and Rate Office, Islington Row, Birmingham 1886
- Methodist Central Hall, Corporation Street, Birmingham 1887 (replaced in 1900)
- St James' Parish Church, Norton Canes 1887-88 (rebuilding after a fire)
- All Saints' Church, Kirkby Mallory 1888 (restoration)
- Office building, Sheepcote Street, Birmingham 1890
- Christ Church, Quinton, Birmingham 1890 restoration
- St Thomas Mission Hall, Ellis Street 1891
- St. Thomas' Church, Birmingham 1893 restoration
- London and Midland Bank, High Street/Little Park Street, Coventry 1894, "in the Elizabethan style of architecture".
- W.M. Smythe Solicitors' offices, 29 Newhall Street/106-110 Edmund Street, Birmingham 1895
- Extension to the Royal Institution for Deaf and Dumb Children, Church Road, Edgbaston 1899
- Extension to the Birmingham Smithfield Vegetable Market 1903
- St Peter's Church, Spring Hill 1902
- St Peter's Church, Dudley Road (undated).
- Scottish Provident Buildings, Birmingham (undated).
- Private hospital, Newhall Street, Birmingham (undated).
