= S. P. B. Mais =

British writer and broadcaster (1885–1975)

- Born: Stuart Petre Brodie Mais; July 4, 1885; Ladywood, Birmingham, Warwickshire, United Kingdom of Great Britain and Ireland
- Died: April 21, 1975 (aged 89); Lindfield, West Sussex, United Kingdom
- Education: Denstone College
- Alma mater: Christ Church
- Spouse: Doris Snow
- Partner: Winifred Doughty
- Children: 4
- Writing career
- Language: English

Stuart Petre Brodie Mais (4 July 1885 – 21 April 1975), known publicly as S. P. B. Mais, was a British author, journalist and broadcaster. He was an author of travel books and guides, and had an informal style that made him popular with the general public.

== Biography ==
Petre Mais, as he was known in his personal life, was the son of Rev. John Brodie Stuart Mais, curate of St Margaret's, Ladywood, Birmingham and his wife Hannah Horden (née Tamlin). He was born at Ladywood, but raised in Tansley, Derbyshire, where his family relocated on his father's appointment as rector there in 1890.

He was educated at Denstone College, Staffordshire, then read English Literature at Christ Church, Oxford (BA 1909, MA 1913) After teaching at Rossall, Sherborne and Tonbridge, and Royal Air Force College Cranwell, he later worked for the Daily Express, the Daily Graphic and The Daily Telegraph. A prolific author of over 200 books, he also broadcast for numerous wireless programmes for the BBC between the 1920s and 1940s. Mais was an ardent campaigner for the English countryside and traditions, leading walks for people who came for a day trip by train from big cities, often from London.

Mais worked as a journalist for The Oxford Times newspaper, and also for the BBC as a radio broadcaster, most famously on the Kitchen Front radio programme that aired after the morning news during the Second World War. He also presented a series on This Unknown Island.

One grandson is Evening Standard writer Sebastian Shakespeare, who wrote of his grandfather:

My grandfather, S. P. B. Mais, wrote more than 200 books and was a household name in his day. Prolific production alas was no guarantee of riches. He wrote to keep the bailiffs at bay. I'll never forget when my mother told me how she once had to hand over the contents of her piggy bank to his creditors.

== Personal life ==
In 1913, Mais married Doris Snow; they had two daughters: Priscilla (1916–1982) and Vivien (born 1920). After their separation (they never divorced), he had a relationship with Winifred Doughty (1905–1993), who changed her name by deed poll to Gillian ("Jill") Mais; they also had two daughters. After becoming dissatisfied with living standards in the tiny retirement home at Lindfield, Sussex that had been offered to the penniless Mais by the Samaritan Housing Association, along with Mais's refusal to marry her, Jill left Mais for a mutual friend, Dudley Carew, whom she married, and lived with him across the road from Mais, taking him meals.

== Death ==
Mais died on 21 April 1975 at his retirement accommodation in Lindfield, Sussex.

== Bibliography ==
=== Critical works ===
- Delight in Books (1931)
- A Chronicle of English Literature (1936)

=== Novels ===
- The Education of a Philanderer (1919)
- Prunello (1924)
- Eclipse (1925)
- Perissa (1925)
- Orange Street (1926)
- Light over Lundy (1938)

=== Travel books ===
These include:

- See England First (1927)
- Do you know North Cornwall? My finest holiday (1927 for the Southern Railway)
- The Cornish Riviera (1928 for the Great Western Railway)
- Glorious Devon (1928 for the Great Western Railway)
- North Wales (1928 for the London Midland and Scottish Railway)
- Sussex 1929
- It isn't far from London (1930)
- Southern rambles for Londoners (1931 for the Southern Railway)
- The Highlands of Britain (1932)
- This unknown island (1932)
- Week-ends in England (1933)
- Isles of the island (1934)
- England's pleasance (1935)
- Lovely Britain edited (1935)
- Round about England (1935)
- Southern schools (1935 for the Southern Railway)
- Pictorial Britain and Ireland (ca1936 for the Anglo-American Oil Co – Esso)
- England's Character (1936)
- A.C.E: the Atlantic Coast Express (1937 for the Southern Railway)
- Britain calling (1938)
- Let's get out here (1938 for the Southern Railway)
- Walking in Somerset (1938)
- Listen to the Country (1939)
- Highways and Byways in the Welsh Marches (1939)
- Hills of the South (1939)
- I Return to Scotland (1947)
- I Return to Switzerland (1948)
- I Return to Ireland (1948)
- I Return to Wales (1949)
- Little England Beyond Wales (1949)
- The Land of The Cinque Ports (illus. by Rowland Hilder) (1949)
- The Riviera – New Look and Old (1950)
- We Wander in the West (1950)
- Arden and Avon (1951)
- Norwegian Odyssey (1951)
- The Channel Islands (1953)
- Our Village Today (1956)
- Majorcan Holiday (with Gillian Mais) (1956)
