= Birmingham Botanical Gardens, England =

Botanical garden in Birmingham

Birmingham Botanical Gardens (England)
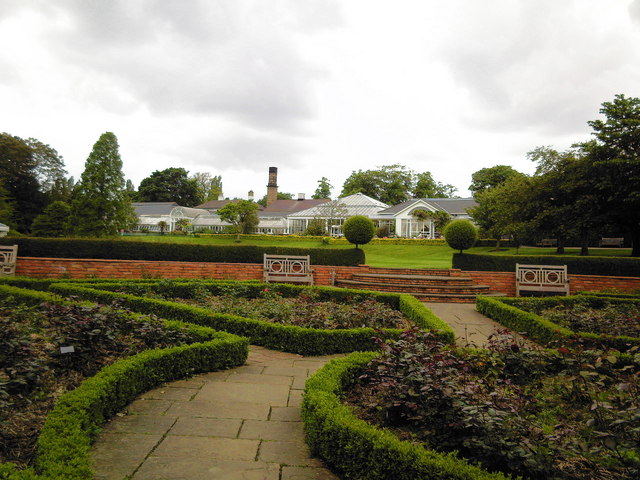
- The rose garden

- Location within West Midlands county
- Location: Westbourne Road, Edgbaston, Birmingham, England
- Coordinates: 52°27′59″N 1°55′45″W
- Area: 15 acres (6.1 ha)
- Created: 1832
- Website: birminghambotanicalgardens.org.uk

National Register of Historic Parks and Gardens
- Official name: Birmingham Botanical Gardens
- Designated: 1 July 1986
- Reference no.: 1001200

The Birmingham Botanical Gardens are a 15-acre (6-hectare) botanical garden situated in Edgbaston, Birmingham, England. The gardens are located 1 1/2 miles (2.4 km) south-west of Birmingham city centre at grid reference SP049854. Designed in 1829, the gardens are Grade II* listed in Historic Englands's Register of Parks and Gardens, and retain many original features and layout, which was designed by the landscape gardener and horticulturalist John Claudius Loudon. The site is notable for its range of glasshouses and gardens, which display a wide variety of plants and previously, birds. Birmingham Botanical Gardens is managed by Birmingham Botanical and Horticultural Society, a registered charity. The gardens are open daily to the public with paid admission.

== History ==
On 23 September 1829 a committee of local men under the presidency of the William Legge, 4th Earl of Dartmouth formed the Birmingham Botanical and Horticultural Society to establish a botanical garden. The patrons were Richard Curzon-Howe, 1st Earl Howe, George Annesley, 2nd Earl of Mountnorris, William Lyttelton, 3rd Baron Lyttelton, George Gough-Calthorpe, 3rd Baron Calthorpe , Sir E.D. Scott, Bart, W. Withering Esq LL.D. and Chandos Leigh Esq.

To raise funds, local residents become shareholders, and over 600 shares at £5 each (equivalent to £475 in 2025) were purchased. An experienced local gardener, Mr Lunn, selected an 18 acres (7.3 ha) farm called Holly Bank on the Edgbaston estate of George Gough-Calthorpe, 3rd Baron Calthorpe as a suitable site.

The gardens were designed by John Claudius Loudon, a leading garden planner, horticultural journalist and publisher. The aim was to combine a scientific and ornamental garden and arboretum that would include a nursery and market garden for selling plants, fruits and vegetables to help with the gardens' maintenance costs. Loudon's design for the main conservatory was rejected as too expensive, so it was eventually designed by a local manufacturer. It took three years to plan and construct the site, before it was opened to members of the society on 11 June 1832. Further development and planting continued throughout the decade. Due to rising expenditure, the southern part of the gardens was given up in 1844 and would eventually be used as Westbourne Road Leisure Gardens. The layout of the Botanical Gardens has changed very little since Loudon first designed it.

In 1852, the Tropical House was built, to house the tropical water lily, Victoria amazonica. This was followed by the construction of the Subtropical House in 1871. In 1884, the present-day Terrace glasshouses replaced the original conservatory and lean-to houses.

Birmingham Botanical Gardens has played a significant role in the dissemination of Loudon's ideas in terms of planting and garden layout within the Birmingham area. Between 1833 and 1927, the gardens hosted annual exhibitions of exotic plants, fruits and flowers, which raised local horticultural expertise. In 1910 a zoological collection was introduced with the aim of increasing society membership and this included bears, monkeys, seals and alligators. Although the zoological collection was later abandoned, the gardens' collection of birds remained a feature until March 2024.

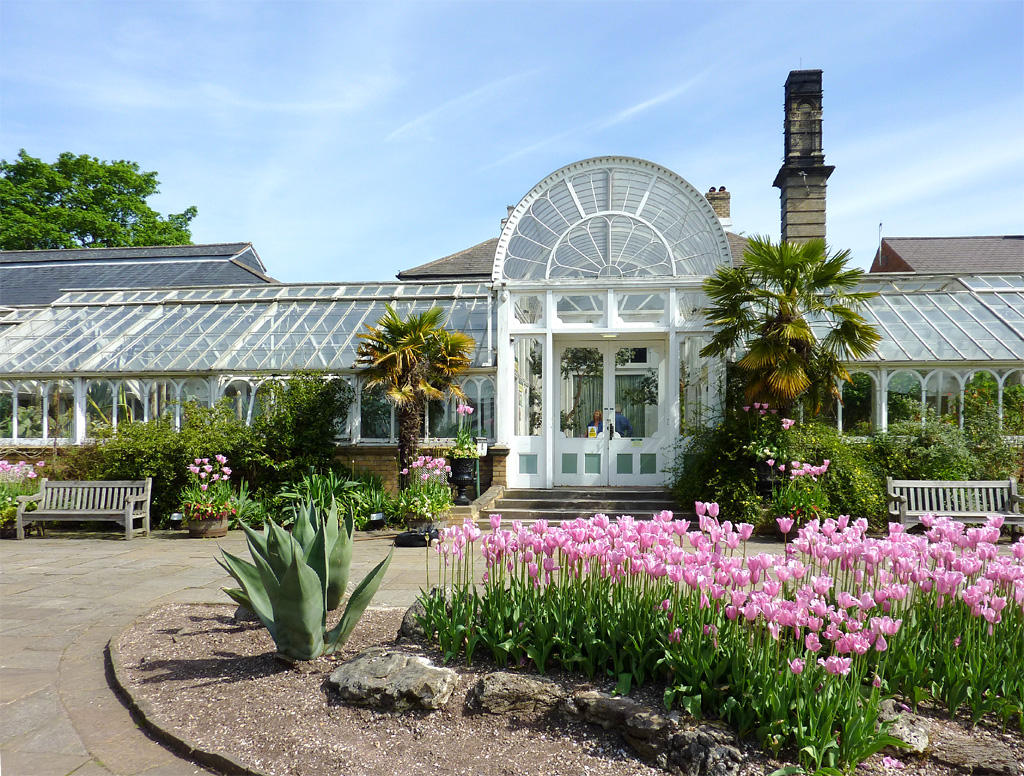
The glasshouses

Throughout the 1980s and 1990s a £1.8 million refurbishment of the gardens took place, which involved the introduction of several new buildings and the restoration of the glasshouses. An aviary was constructed in 1995, and housed a variety of birds in four different flights. In 2019, the Taking a Stand! campaign was announced to restore the octagonal iron bandstand, so it could be used as an all-weather outdoor space for schools and be a platform for music and other events, such as weddings. In April 2021, the bandstand, brought to its 1874 glory, was dedicated as the Peter Sowerby Bandstand, following a donation from the Peter Sowerby Foundation, the bandstand had been redecorated up 18 times in its history. On 10 July 2023, a £13m revamp was announced to restore its four glasshouses under the Growing Our Green Heritage after it was awarded almost £600,000 from the National Lottery Heritage Fund to develop the first phase of the project to due commence in mid-2025 (but delayed to a date to be determined) and be completed in 2028, with a further £4.4m available as the programme progresses. In September 2024, proposals were submitted for the restoration of the botanical gardens' historic glasshouses. In January 2025, the city council of Birmingham, England approved plans to restore the historic glasshouse estate. On 10 July 2025, two years after the £13m revamp under the Growing Our Green Heritage was announced, the botanical gardens secured £9m awarded from the National Lottery Fund, meaning the project became 90% toward its goal of £19.4m, the project will restore the Grade II* listed glasshouses, carrying out urgently needed repairs and restorations for four and a half years, to permit its 30,000 plants of unique scientific and heritage significance being conserved without the glasshouse.

== Features ==
Overall, the character of Birmingham Botanical Gardens is that of a Victorian public park set in 15 acres (6.1 ha) of landscaped greenery.

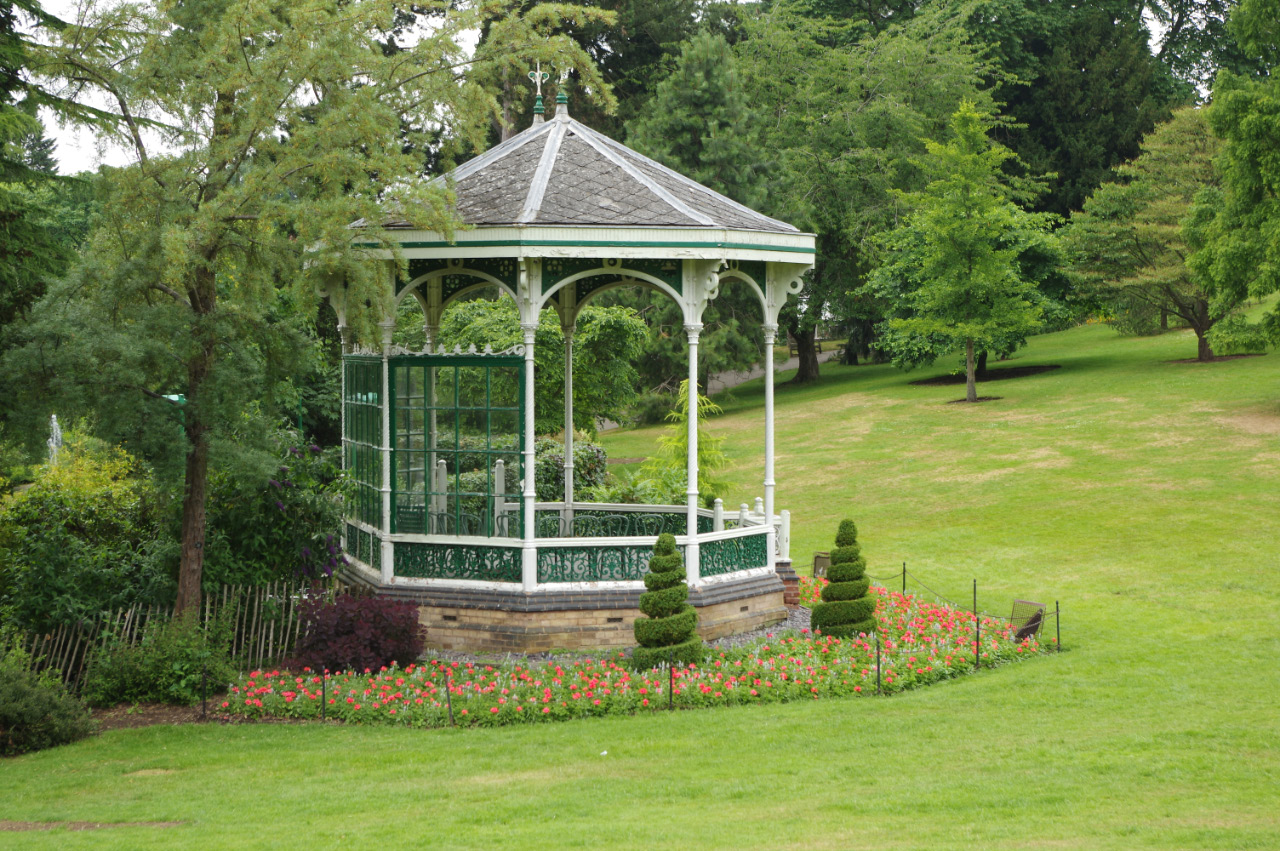
The bandstand by Frank Barlow Osborn

The gardens feature four glasshouses, which are tropical, subtropical, Mediterranean and arid glasshouses. In the Alan King alpine garden, there is a glasshouse with a pot display of alpine plants hosted in a sand plunge, and a tufa house. Running along the south range of glasshouses is the terrace, also known as the Loudon Terrace, which provides views of the Main Lawn, with its range of beds and shrubberies around the perimeter. The Aviary, which was located on the south-east side of the lawn torn down in November 2024, comprised four domed iron flight cages. A sunken Rose Garden can be located on the north side of the now-gone Aviary. A 19th Century Grade II listed, octagonal iron bandstand, designed by Frank Barlow Osborn, is situated on the west side of the lawn. At the north-west corner of the lawn stands an octagonal, pierced-work, cast-iron gazebo, which dates to c. 1850 and was moved to the gardens in the mid 1990s. A Coade stone fountain lies west of the bandstand, which was presented in 1850 and was designed by the Birmingham architect, Charles Edge.

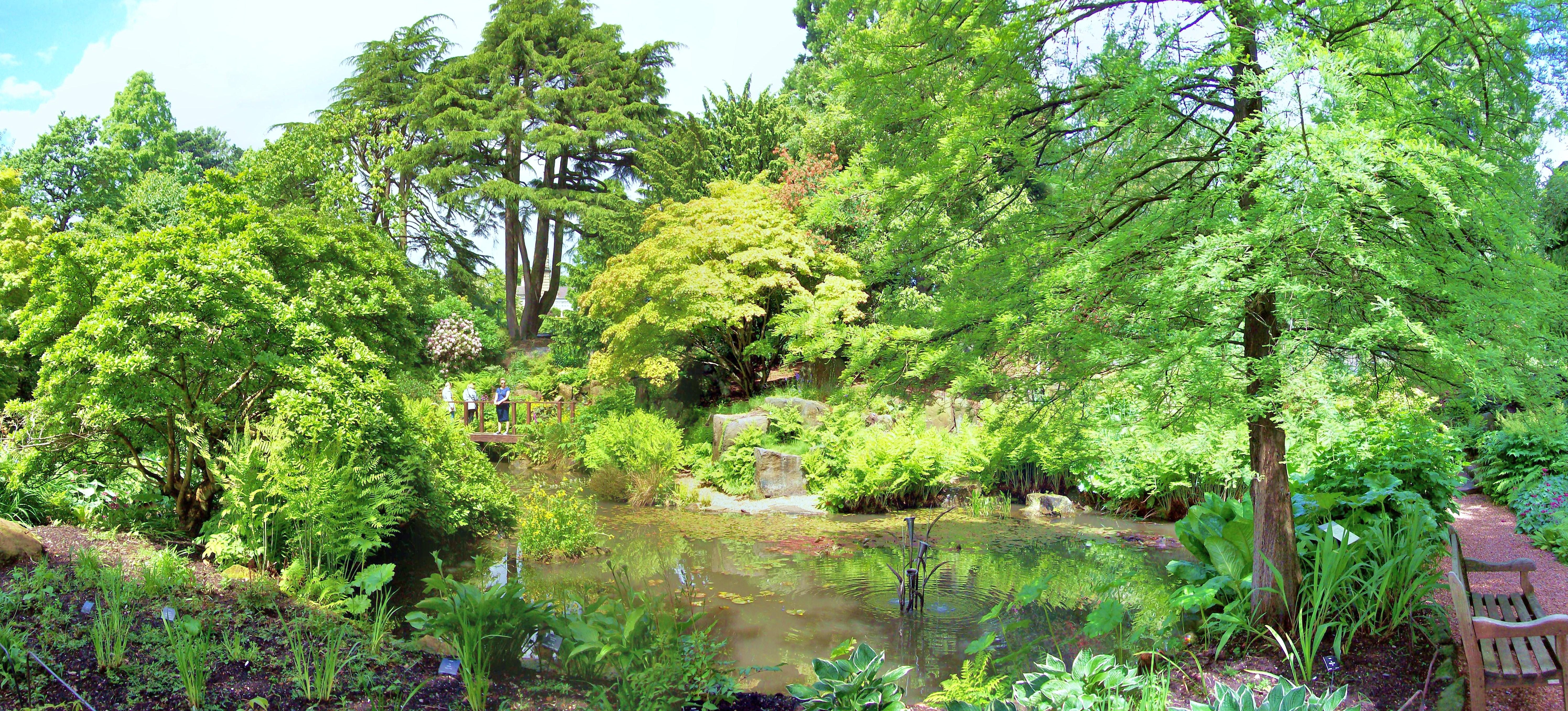
The Rock Garden and Pool

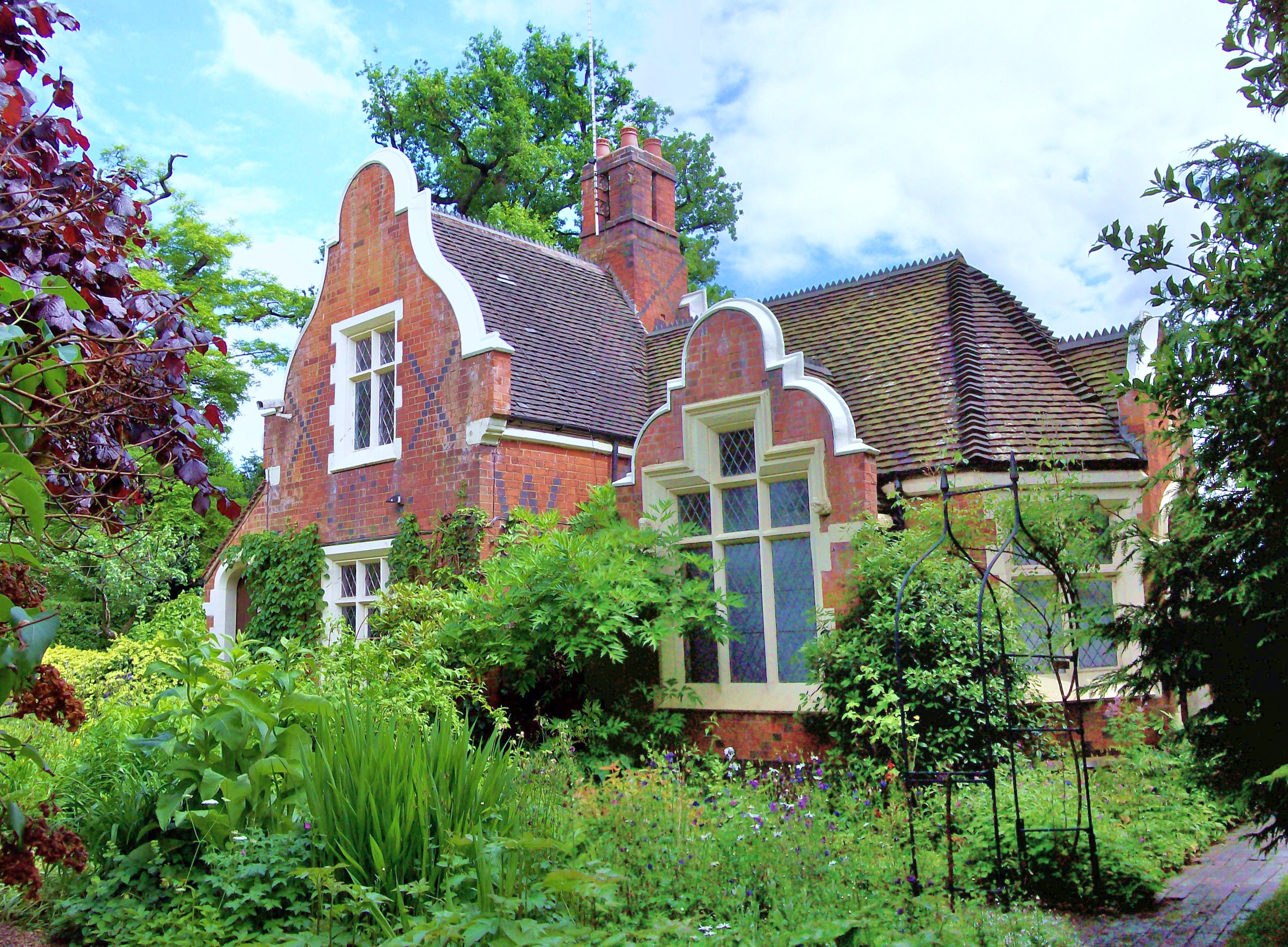
The Teulon cottage

From the west side of the Main Lawn, a network of paths wind north and south, giving access to the other main features around the gardens. To the north east lie the Pinetum, Winter Gardens, the West Lawn and the Herbaceous Border. To the south-east is a rock garden and pool, dating to 1895, Rhododendron Walk and the Ernest 'China' Wilson Border. At the southernmost section of the gardens are the Azalea Walk, Fern Walk and Woodland Glade laid out 1862. On the west side of the path looping around the Rhododendron Walk is a Conservation Garden created in 1991. South of this, in the southern corner of the gardens, is the Nursery. At the north-west corner of the gardens, is the Curator's Lodge, built in the 1960s. In 1999, this was extended to become a study centre. South of this, against the east boundary of the gardens, is a series of three period gardens (Roman, Medieval and Tudor), which were created in 1994. Next to the Roman Garden to the south is (what used to be) a waterfowl pool and further south lies a children's playground. A museum is housed in the red-brick, Grade II listed Teulon Cottage, which was designed by Samuel Sanders Teulon. Near the west boundary is a rock garden, which was constructed in 1895 in memory of Sir Hugh Nettlefold, an important benefactor.

== Plants ==
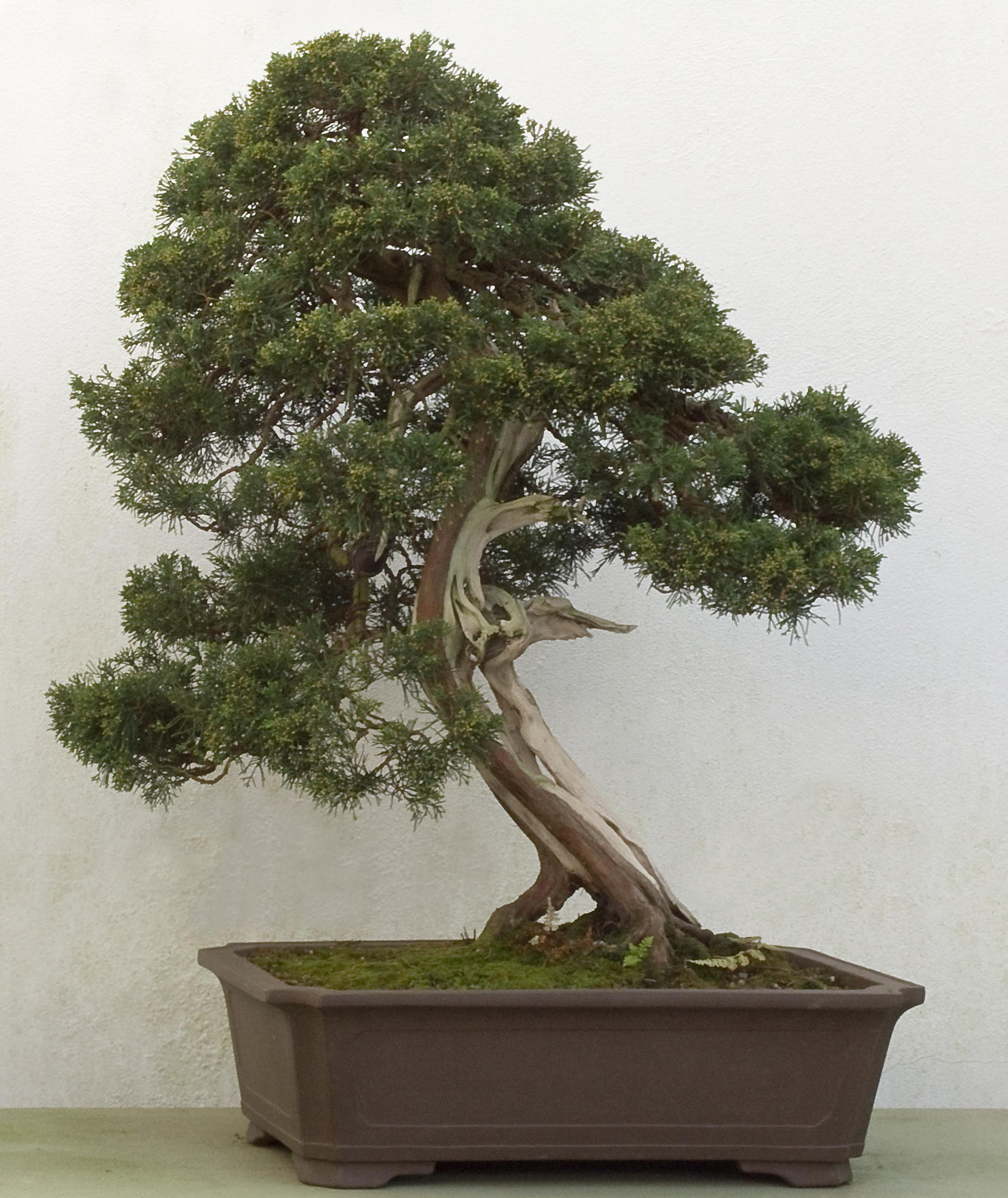
The "Omiya tree"

Birmingham Botanical Gardens contain over 7,000 different plants from around the world.

The gardens are home to The British National Bonsai Collection, which opened in 1993 and aims to provide both casual visitors and enthusiasts with a comprehensive display of the variations of species and styles of bonsai. One of the oldest specimens is the "Omiya tree", a 250-year-old Juniperus chinensis in the informal upright style, presented to the collection in 1995 by the then city of Omiya, Japan.

Each of the four glasshouses features a different variety of plants. The tropical glasshouse consists of essential crops, such as rice, cocoa, sugar cane and cotton, as well as ornamental and aquatic plants. The subtropical glasshouse features orchids, ferns and carnivorous plants, such as Venus flytraps. The Mediterranean glasshouse provides visitors with a display of citrus trees and shrubs. The arid glasshouse consists of survivalist plants, such as cacti and aloe vera.

There are many unusual and notable plants in the gardens including two fine Himalayan cedars close to the fountain. These were raised from seeds given to the gardens in the 1840s by James Watt Junior, the son of James Watt whose improvements to the Newcomen steam engine were fundamental to the changes brought by the Industrial Revolution. A plant found nowhere else is the fern Dicksonia ×lathamii which is a hybrid between Dicksonia antarctica and Dicksonia arborescens, raised by ex-Curator W. B. Latham more than one hundred years ago.

== Birds ==
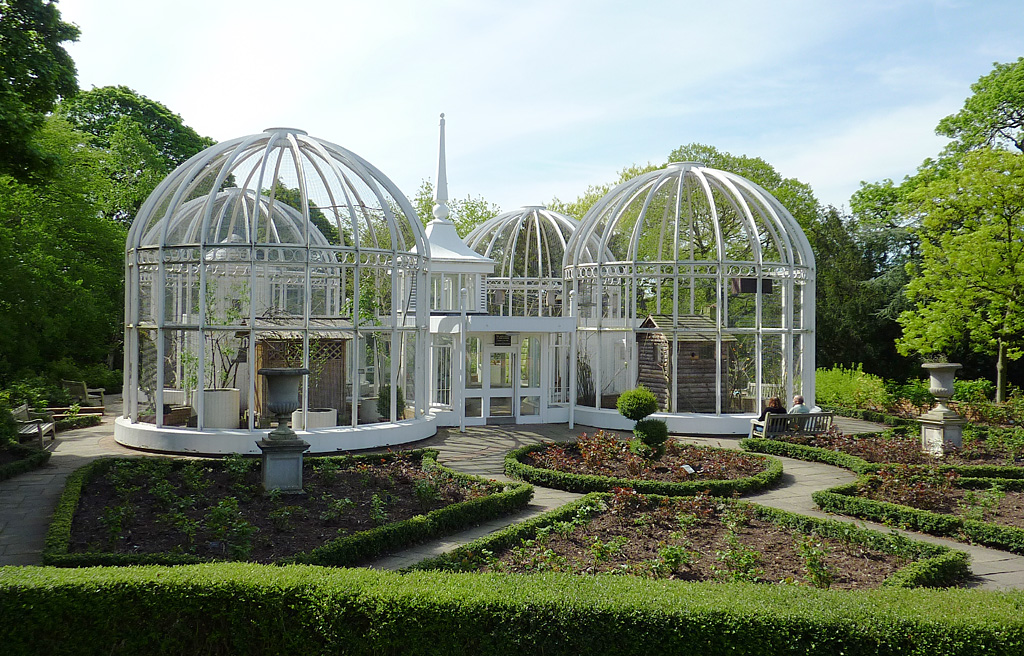
The Aviary (now demolished)

The gardens were home to a small collection of exotic birds from around the world including white-cheeked turaco, Himalayan monals, azure-winged magpies and Quaker parakeets. The majority of the gardens' birds were located in the white-domed aviary building that provided a focal point on the main lawn. The aviary consisted of four distinct sections, three of which represented Asia, Africa and the Americas. The Asian section housed colourful tragopans, the African section was home to different varieties of lovebirds, and the American section housed Quaker parakeets. The fourth section consisted of soft-billed birds, such as starlings and Mynah birds. The gardens also feature a wetlands enclosure that contains a variety of ornamental waterfowl. The terrace was the location for the gardens’ parrots, including a sulphur-crested cockatoo named Jenny that entertained visitors with her chatter, and Lionel, a blue macaw. In March 2024, the birds were moved to different bird sanctuaries and the lawn aviary was demolished in November 2024.

== Facilities ==
Birmingham Botanical Gardens features a gift shop, plant sales centre, tea room, meeting and conference facilities, and five event suites, including the Loudon, Garden and Terrace Suites.

There are two playground areas for children, a traditional playground with swings and slide and a children's discovery garden where children can learn about plants through interactive play.

== Education ==
The gardens serve schools, colleges, nurseries and youth groups in the West Midlands and beyond with outdoor educational visits. The education programme includes cross-curricular teaching sessions. Schools are able to use the purpose-built education building called the Study Centre. The Centre also hosts a variety of leisure courses for adults, including photography, nature and heritage courses.

== Events ==
There is an all-year events programme at the gardens that includes activity sessions for youngsters, garden tours, family activities, photography and art classes, theatre, music and falconry.

== Notable people ==
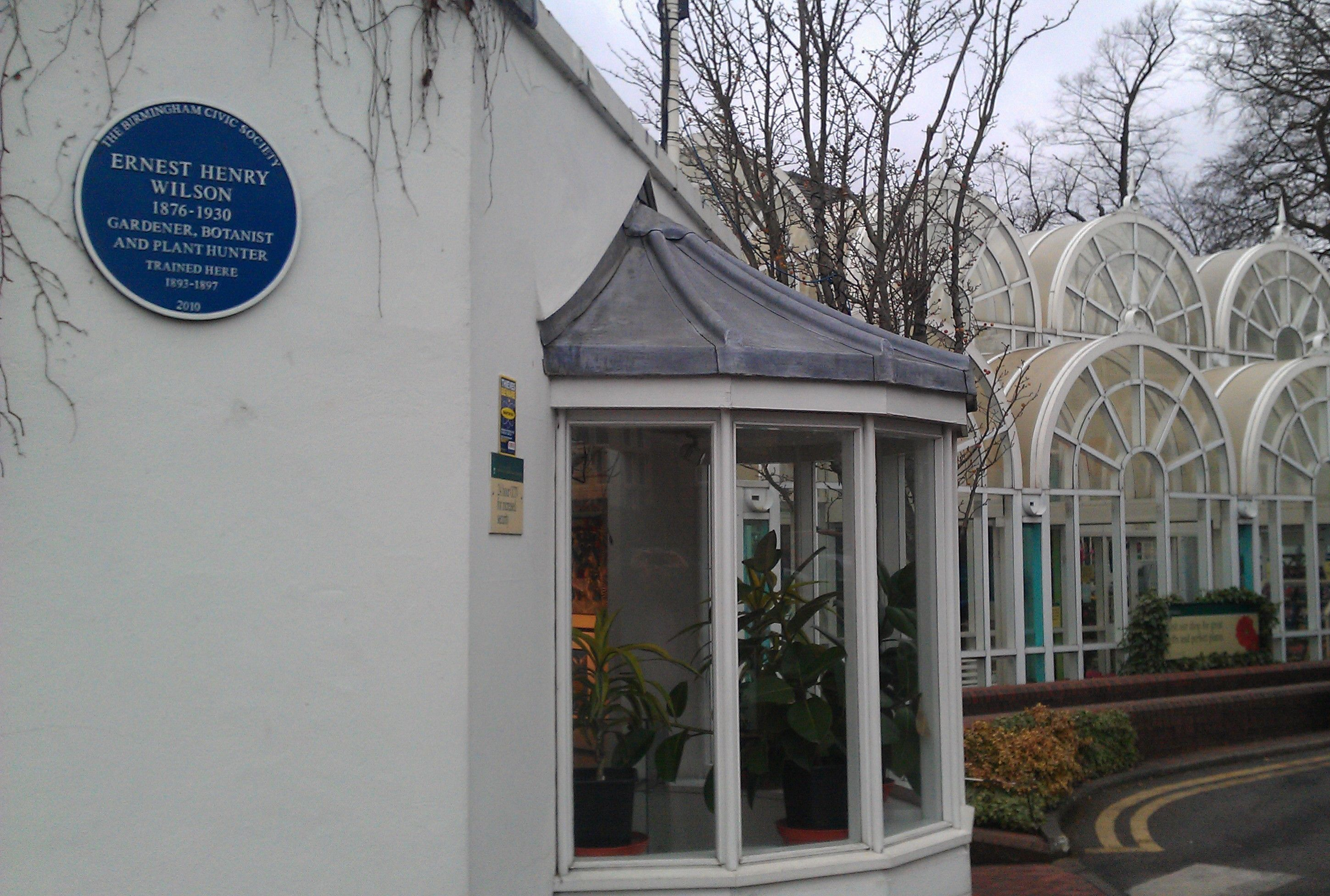
Wilson's blue plaque, with the gardens' main entrance in the background, which will be moved elsewhere during the Growing Our Green project

- John Claudius Loudon was the gardens' designer. He was a Scottish botanist, garden designer and horticulturalist.
- Ernest Henry Wilson (1893-1897) was a trainee botanist at the gardens. He went on to become a notable plant collector. In May 2010, a blue plaque was erected at the gardens, by the Birmingham Civic Society, marking his time there.
- Joseph Chamberlain and Neville Chamberlain were generous supporters of the gardens. In particular, Joseph donated many rare plants.

== Curators ==
- David Cameron 1831-1847 (formerly head gardener for the Barclays banking family) the gardens' first curator. He was recruited by Loudon and was responsible for implementing Loudon's vision.
- Charles Henry Catling 1847 - 1868
- William Bradbury Latham 1868 - 1903 a distinguished curator of the gardens. He was an orchid and fern specialist and is remembered in the fern garden and Subtropical House where his unique hybrid tree fern Dicksonia x lathamii still grows more than 140 years after it was bred in 1872.
- Thomas Humphries VMH 1903 - 1932 (From 1887 arboretum propagator at the Royal Gardens, Kew, from 1897 Assistant Superintendent of the Royal Horticultural Society gardens at Chiswick)
- Donald Harvey 1947 - 1959
- Geoffrey Elvin Collins 1959 - 1964 (previously head gardener at Tresco Abbey gardens)
- John Warrington 1964 - 1969 (formerly head gardener of the Essex County Horticultural Institute)
- Philip R. Butler 1969 - 1987 (formerly Curator at Cambridge University Botanic Garden)
- Professor A. Donald Skelding ca. 1987 - ca. 1996
- James Wheeler from 2003 (formerly head gardener of Hever Castle)

== See also ==
- List of botanical gardens in the United Kingdom
- John Claudius Loudon
- Ernest Henry Wilson
