= Radford, Coventry =

Area of Coventry, England

Coordinates: 52.41659°N 1.51429°W

Radford
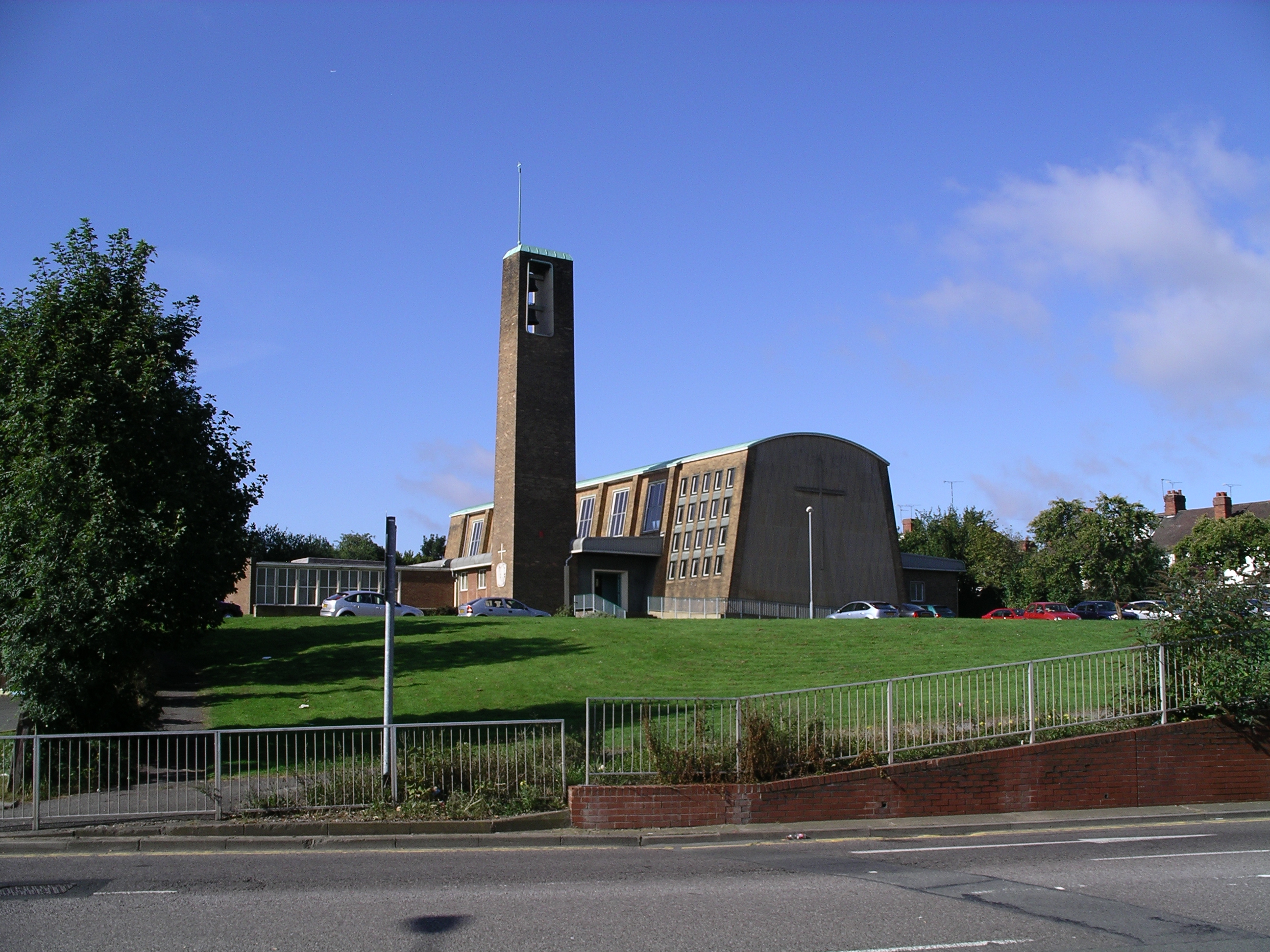
- The Now Demolished St. Nicholas Church, Radford

- Location within the West Midlands
- Population: 18,879 (2011.Ward)
  - Density: 64.7 per ha
- Metropolitan borough: Coventry
- Metropolitan county: West Midlands
- Region: West Midlands
- Country: England
- Sovereign state: United Kingdom
- Post town: COVENTRY
- Postcode district: CV6
- Dialling code: 024 or 025
- Police: West Midlands
- Fire: West Midlands
- Ambulance: West Midlands
- UK Parliament: Coventry North West

Radford is a suburb and electoral ward of Coventry, located approximately 1.5 miles north of Coventry city centre. It is covered by the Coventry North West constituency.

== Geography ==
Radford ward is bounded by Holbrooks, Foleshill, St Michael's, Sherbourne, and Bablake wards. It is covered by the North East Neighbourhood Management area. It covers an area of 303.9 hectares.

Radford consists of four neighbourhoods; Radford Diamond, East Radford, West Radford, and Canal Basin. Radford Diamond is located approximately one mile to the northwest of Coventry city centre and is bounded by Barkers Butts Lane, Lawrence Saunders Road and the Radford Road with the Coventry-Nuneaton railway forming the southern boundary. East Radford is a small neighbourhood consisting of six streets of densely populated housing: Newfield Road, Dorset Road, Somerset Road, Widdrington Road, Kingfield Road and Aldbourne Road. The Coventry-Nuneaton railway bounds the area on one side whilst the Coventry Canal bounds the other. West Radford is a large neighbourhood with a population of approximately 3,800, located approximately two miles north of the city centre. The Jubilee Crescent area, the area around St. Augustine's School and the Beake Avenue/Radford Road area are the three distinct parts to the neighbourhood. The Canal Basin neighbourhood comprises Leicester Row, St Nicholas Street, St Columba's Close and the Draper's Field development.

== History ==
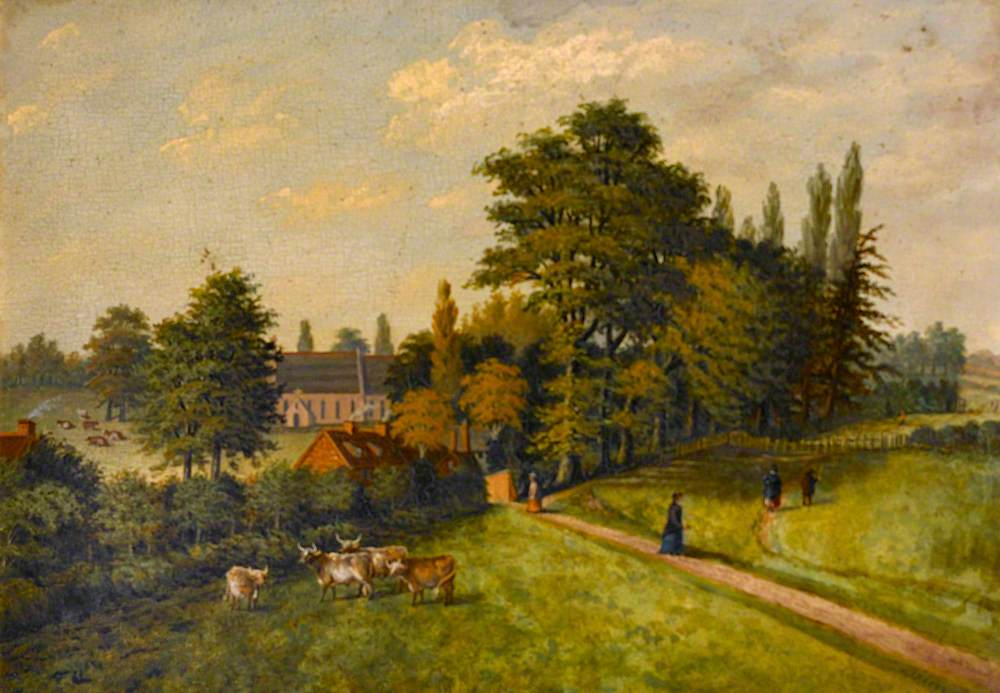
St Nicholas's Church, Radford, Coventry, oil on panel, by William Earp Reeve (1878) held in the collection of the Herbert Art Gallery and Museum

At the end of the 19th century, Radford was turning from a largely undeveloped rural area into one of Coventry's major manufacturing areas. The southern area of Radford benefited from the presence of the Coventry Canal and also the railway, and was served by Daimler Halt railway station, located on Sandy Lane. This was also the site of the Sandy Lane power station, which has now been turned into a mixed use residential and business development - Electric Wharf.

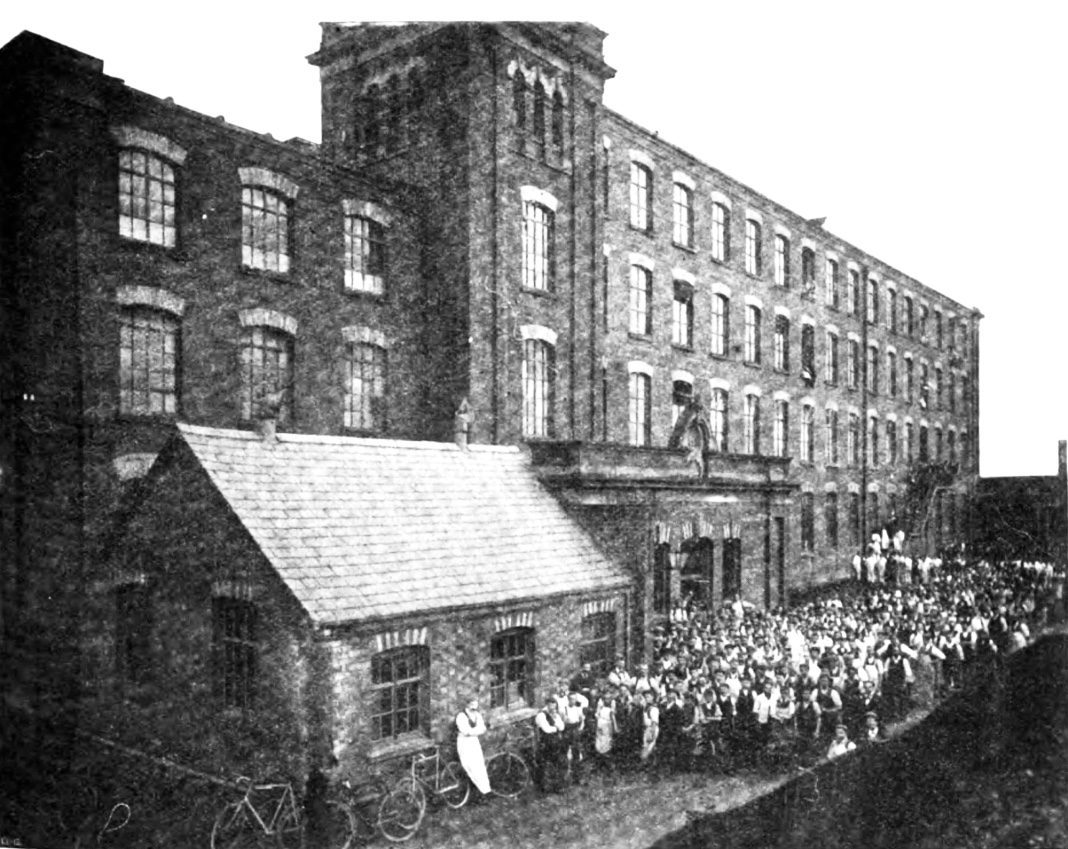
Motor Mills (1896)

Possibly Radford's greatest historical claim to fame comes from its centrality in the birth of the British motor car industry. The Great Horseless Carriage Company was established in 1896 in converted cotton mill works, and renamed Motor Mills, between St. Nicholas Street, Sandy Lane, and the Coventry Canal. It included a red-brick office block with stone banding on Sandy Lane built 1907–08, and an electricity power house which was added in 1907. Soon after, the company changed its name to Daimler and shortly before the First World War, they moved to a new factory at the Lydgate Road/Sandy Lane Junction. The factory was greatly extended during and after the First World War to incorporate entrances on both Sandy Lane and Middlemarch Road. After a merger in 1960, the factory also became home to Jaguar, who remained there till production ceased in the mid-1990s.

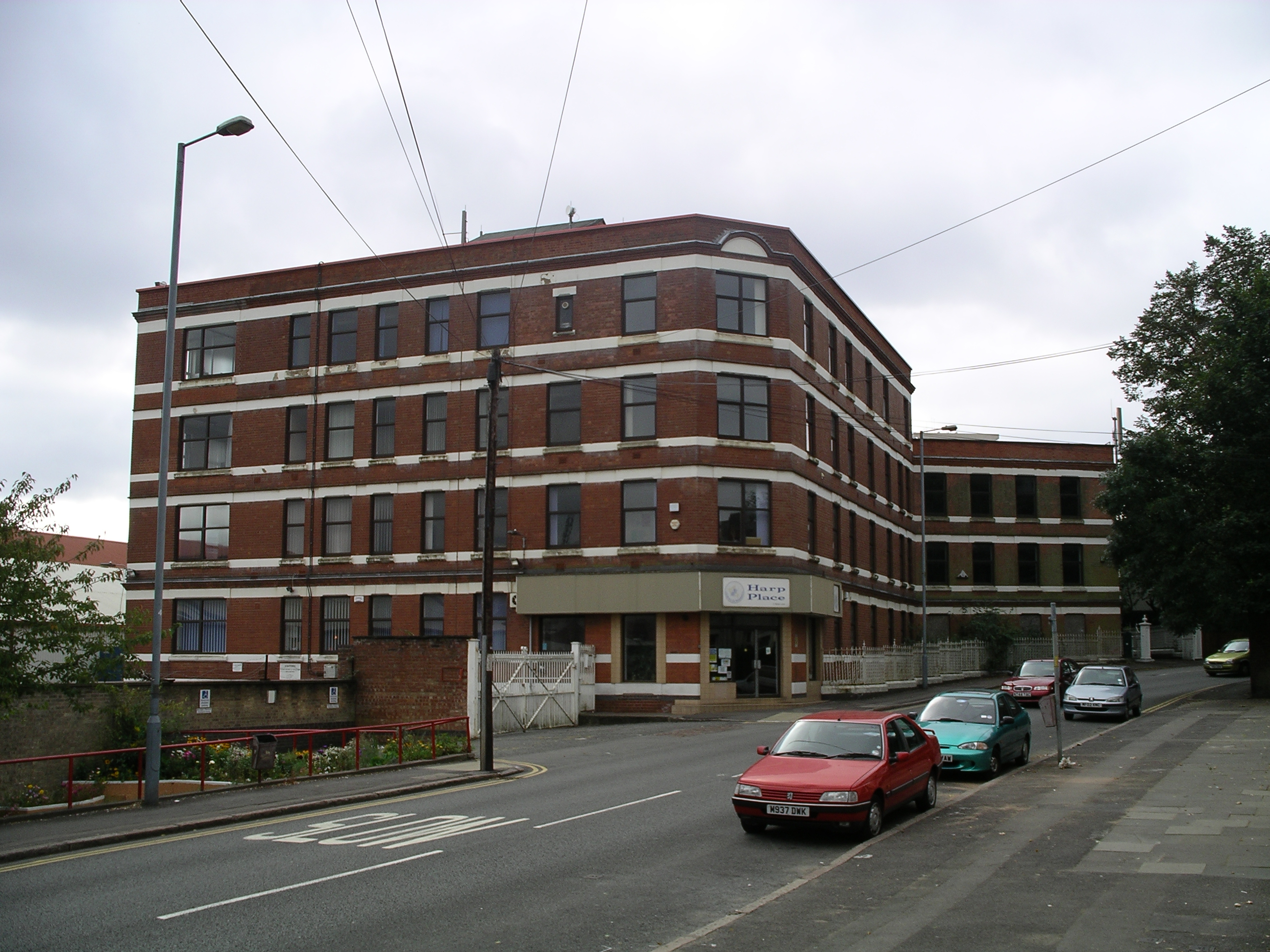
The red-brick building on Sandy Lane, Radford, now called Harp Place, was formerly the office block of Motor Mills. (photo 2007)

Between the world wars, and for a short time only, Radford was home to an aerodrome situated close to the Daimler factory, the site of which is now taken by Joseph Cash Primary School and the Coventrians RFC.

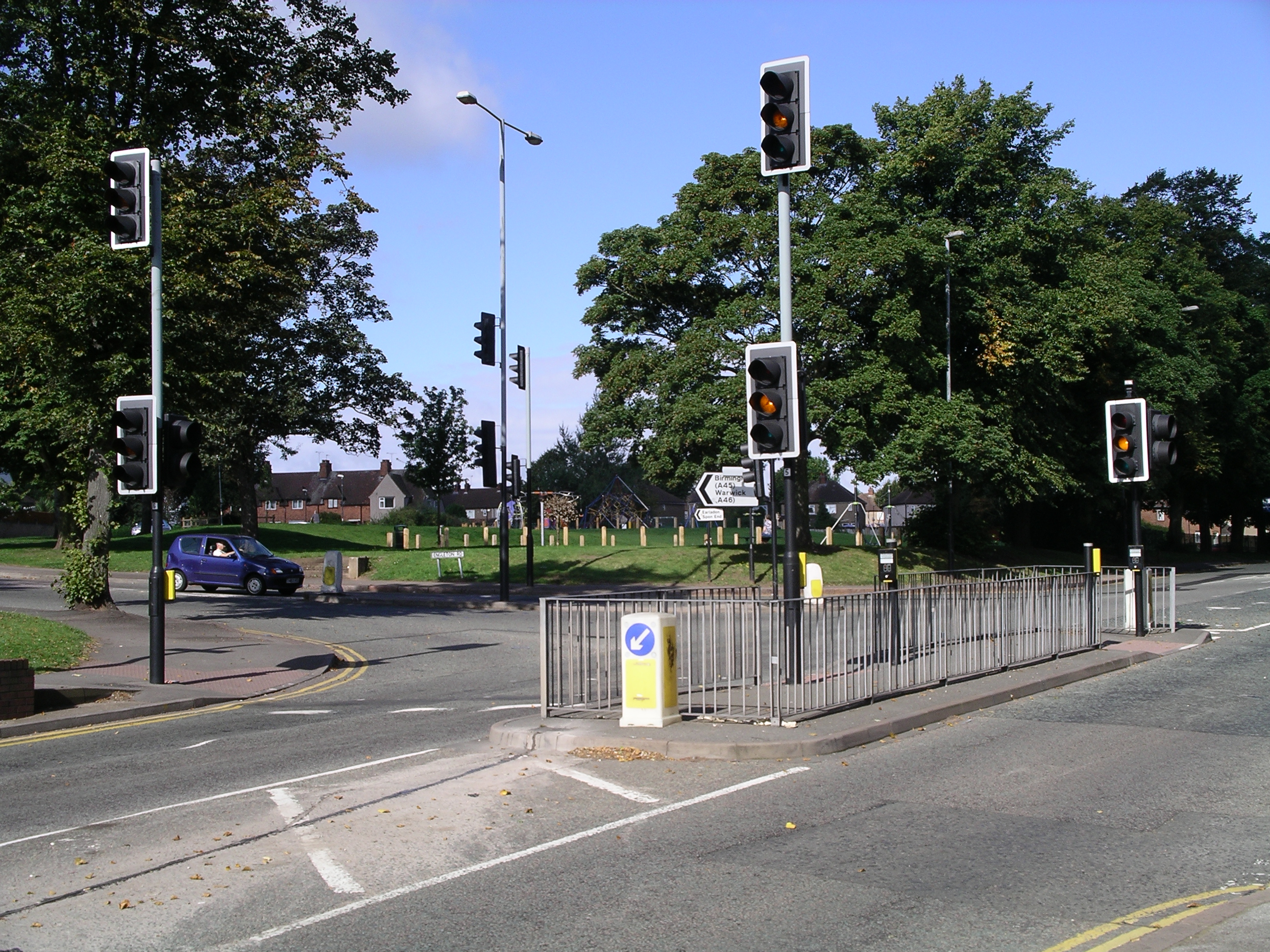
Radford Common

During the "Coventry Blitz" in the Second World War, Radford became a major target for the Luftwaffe due to the presence of the Daimler and the nearby Alvis factories, who were both producing, munitions and essential vehicles for the British war effort. With the exception of the office block on Sandy Lane and the electricity power house, Motor Mills was destroyed in the blitz. On 19 November 1940, a landmine suspended by parachute was dropped by the Luftwaffe and exploded above ground, destroying St Nicholas' Church, leaving only one course of stones standing. Some of the people seeking shelter in the church crypt were killed or injured.

== Demographics ==
At the time of the 2001 UK Census, Radford ward had a population of 16,901, with a population density of 55.6 persons per hectare. Of the 16,901 people living in Radford, 1,373 were students and 5,308 owned a car. 11,960 people were of a working age whilst 565 people were unemployed. In 2005, the average household income in Radford was £25,015. In 2004, the average house price was £101,583.94.

== Places of interest ==
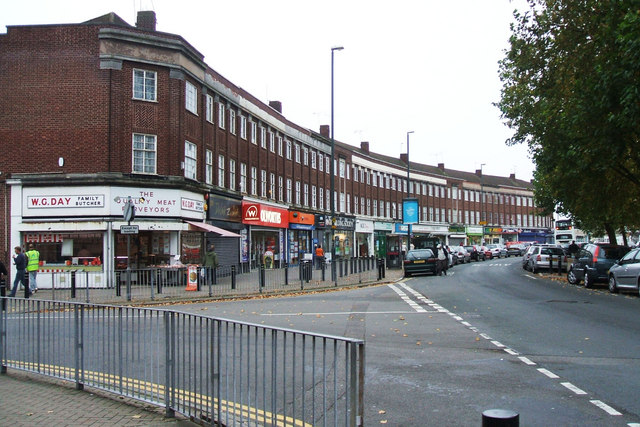
Jubilee Crescent

Radford is bordered on its western side by Radford Road, a main thoroughfare into Coventry city centre which extends out of Coventry to the areas of Keresley and the village of Fillongley. Radford Road is home to several small shops. Radford's other main shopping area is Jubilee Crescent in the northern part of Radford, which also hosts a library, community centre and doctors' surgery as well as many local businesses and branches of national retail chains like Tesco and Asda. Jubilee Crescent was named to commemorate the then forthcoming silver jubilee of King George V in 1935.

Most of the northern area of Radford is residential, following development during the 20th century. Properties range from blocks of flats to semi-detached and terraced housing, and includes both privately owner-occupied properties and council housing. The right to buy scheme decreased the prevalence of local authority housing in the area from the 1980s onwards, and remaining properties were transferred (along with the rest of Coventry City Council's housing stock) to Whitefriars Housing Group in 2000.

Although Radford has endured the closure of many of its key employers in recent years, regeneration efforts are easily visible. The site of Radford railway station has been developed into a block of flats; Sandy Lane Power Station, which became offices for the East Midlands Electricity Board, has been redeveloped into Electric Wharf, a mixed-use site incorporating residential buildings and public art; and the former Daimler works are now a residential area known as Daimler Green.

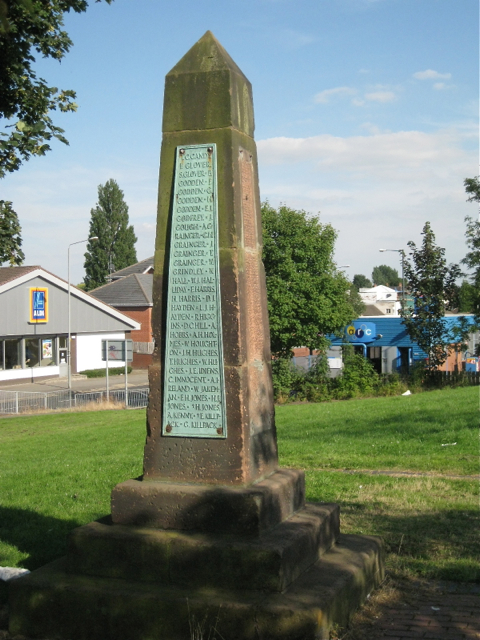
Radford War Memorial on Engleton Road in 2012

Radford also benefits from a generous number of parks including Nauls' Mill Park that runs behind the Radford "Council" Estate (including Hewitt Avenue) and from Bridgeman Road through to Middleborough Road towards the back of Radford Fire Station bordering the City Centre. Other parks include Daimler Park (Between Daimler Road and Cash's Lane) and "Radford Rec" running alongside Lydgate Hill Road. The pink-brown Runcorn sandstone war memorial was unveiled in 1919. This obelisk depicts the names of the 152 from the area who fought in the Great War, a cross by the name of 17 men indicating that they died. Below ground, the busy Radford Brook runs in a culvert and one branch once filled the Nauls' Mill Park pool, before joining the River Sherbourne beneath the Belgrade Theatre.

== Education ==
Barr's Hill School is the coeducational comprehensive secondary school in the area. It was an all-girls grammar school until 1975. Primary schools in the area include Radford Primary Academy, Hill Farm School, St Augustine's RC Primary School, and Joseph Cash Primary School.

== Military ==
Westfield House Army Reserve Centre, on Radford Road, currently houses Army Reserve detachments of the Royal Electrical & Mechanical Engineers, Royal Signals and the Royal Army Medical Corps. There is also a platoon of the Army Cadet Force and an Air Training Corps squadron in residence.

== Famous residents ==
Philip Larkin (1922–1985), widely regarded as one of the greatest English poets of the latter half of the twentieth century, was born in Radford at 2, Poultney Road.

Another former resident of Radford was the British boxer Errol Christie who went on to be European champion in the 1980s.
