= Richard Twentyman =

British painter

- Born: 1903; Bilbrook, Staffordshire, England
- Died: 13 December 1979 (aged 75–76)
- Other name: Alfred
- Education: Cambridge University
- Occupation: Architect

(Alfred) Richard Twentyman (1903–1979) was an English architect based in Wolverhampton; chiefly known for modernist buildings around the English midlands.

== Life ==
Twentyman was born in 1903 in Bilbrook, Staffordshire. He was educated at Cambridge University where he studied engineering and then architecture at the Architectural Association in London. In 1933 he joined H. E. Lavender in Wolverhampton and formed Lavender and Twentyman.

He served with the Royal Engineers during World War II.

Twentyman was awarded the RIBA bronze medal in 1953 and received a Civic Trust Award in 1970.

He was an accomplished watercolourist and painter in oils, holding an exhibition of his works at a London gallery in 1978. An oil painting by him, Pigeon Loft, Sedgley, is held by Wolverhampton Art Gallery. The gallery held an exhibition of his paintings and drawings after his death.

Twentyman died on 13 December 1979 aged 76.

Nikolaus Pevsner praised his work at Rubery and Redditch. St Chad's Church, Rubery is described as being a fine Modernist example, and his crematorium at Redditch as a model example for that class of building.

== Works ==
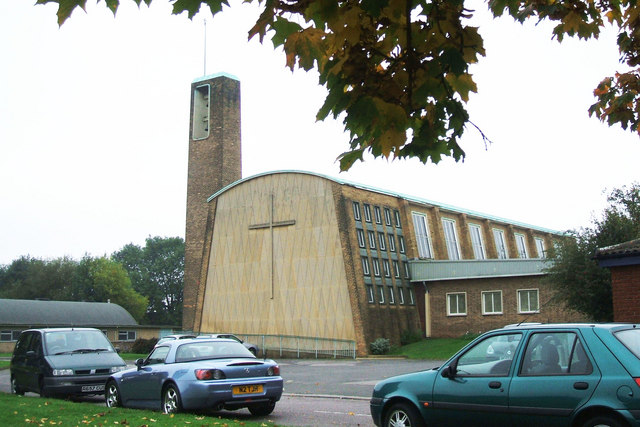
St Nicholas’ Church, Radford, Coventry 1957

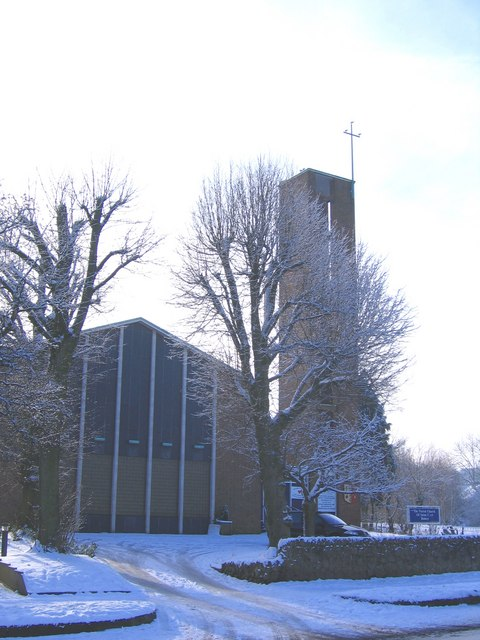
St Chad's Church, Rubery 1960

- The Mitre, Bradmore 1935
- Golden Lion, Cannock Road, Wolverhampton 1935
- Oxley Moor Hotel, Wolverhampton 1937
- The Pilot, Wolverhampton 1937
- The Spring Hill, Penn 1937
- The Red Lion, Wednesfield 1938
- The Spring Hill, Wolverhampton 1939
- The Victoria, Moseley 1939
- St Martin's Church, Parkfields, Wolverhampton 1939
- St Gabriel's Church, Walsall 1939
- All Saints' Church, Darlaston 1952
- Bushbury Crematorium, Wolverhampton 1954
- GKN Research Laboratories, Birmingham New Road, Wolverhampton 1954
- The Good Shepherd Church, Castlecroft, Wolverhampton 1955
- Emmanuel Church, Bentley, Walsall 1956
- St Nicholas' Church, Radford, Coventry 1957 (demolished 2024)
- St Chad's Church, Rubery 1960
- St Andrew's Church, Runcorn 1964
- St Andrew's Church, Wolverhampton 1965 - 1967
- Redditch Crematorium 1973
