= St Chad's Church, Rubery =

St Chad’s Church, Rubery
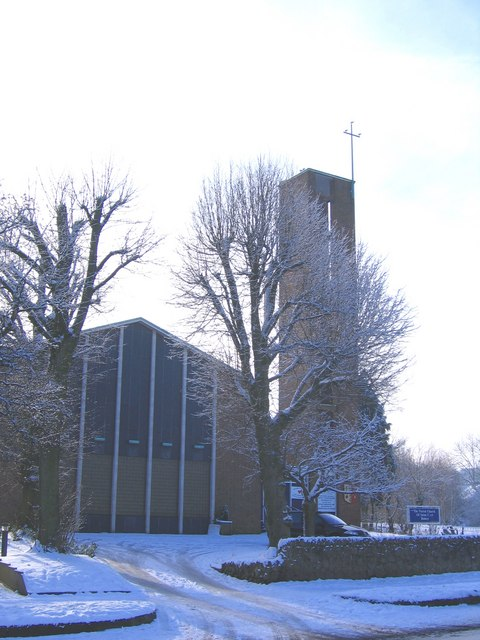
- St Chad’s Church, Rubery
- St Chad’s Church, Rubery
- 52°23′35.45″N 2°1′9.14″W
- Location: Rubery
- Country: England
- Denomination: Church of England

History
- Dedication: St Chad

Architecture
- Heritage designation: Grade II listed
- Designated: 7 November 2025
- Architect: Richard Twentyman
- Style: Modernist
- Groundbreaking: 1959
- Completed: 1960
- Construction cost: £40,000

Administration
- Diocese: Anglican Diocese of Birmingham
- Archdeaconry: Birmingham
- Deanery: Kings Norton
- Parish: St Chad, Rubery

St Chad’s Church, Rubery is a Church of England parish church in Rubery, Worcestershire.

== History ==
The church evolved in 1895 as a mission church from Holy Trinity Church, Lickey. The first building was a small wooden church. The wooden church comprised a nave only, with campanile tower at the west end, tiled with shingles, the roof with red and blue tiles. It accommodated 300 persons and cost £530. The architects were W. Jeffery Hopkins and A.B. Pinckney.

A parish was assigned out of Holy Trinity Church, Lickey in 1933.

The Second World War prevented progress on building a new church, but this was started in 1957 to designs by the architect Richard Twentyman and completed in 1959. The work cost £40,000 and was funded partly by the parish and partly by the Diocesan Golden Jubilee Appeal. Nikolaus Pevsner describes the building as a fine Modernist example. It was listed at Grade II by Historic England on 7 November 2025.

== Organ ==
An organ from St Margaret’s Church, Ladywood was transferred here when St Margaret’s Church closed. A specification of the organ can be found on the National Pipe Organ Register.
