= St Nicholas' Church, Radford, Coventry =

St Nicholas' Church, Radford
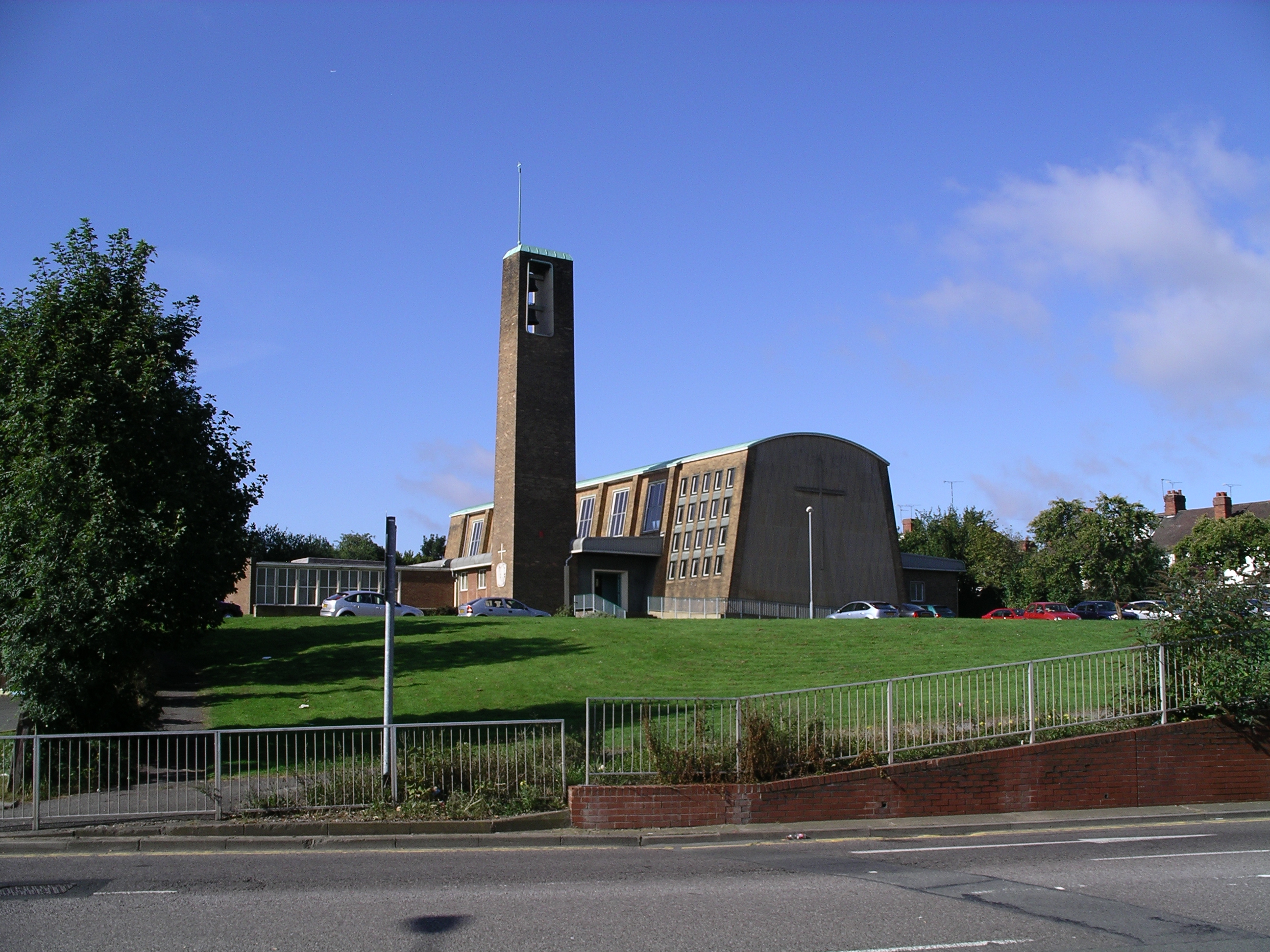
- St Nicholas' Church in 2007 (demolished in 2024)
- St Nicholas' Church, Radford
- 52°25′22.35″N 1°31′22.52″W
- OS grid reference: SP 32539 80648
- Location: Radford, Coventry
- Country: England
- Denomination: Church of England

History
- Dedication: St Nicholas
- Consecrated: 1955

Architecture
- Architect: Richard Twentyman
- Groundbreaking: 1953
- Completed: 1955
- Demolished: 2024

Administration
- Province: Canterbury
- Diocese: Coventry
- Archdeaconry: Coventry
- Deanery: Coventry North
- Parish: St Nicholas Radford

St Nicholas' Church is a parish church in the Church of England in Radford, Coventry. The original church of 1874 was destroyed in the Coventry Blitz in November 1940 and a replacement church was built between 1954 and 1955. Due to its poor condition, the church was vacated in 2009 and demolished in 2024. The congregation now worship in what was originally the church hall.

The parish is in the Anglo-Catholic tradition of the Church of England and receives alternative episcopal oversight from the Bishop of Oswestry.

== History ==
The previous church was built to the designs of George Taylor of Coventry, as a chapel of ease to Holy Trinity Church, Coventry and consecrated on 29 September 1874 by Henry Philpott, the Bishop of Worcester. It comprised a chancel with vestry on the north side, and a nave with the entrance porch at the west end of the south side. The nave was 68 feet (21 m) by 30 feet (9.1 m), the chancel 21 feet (6.4 m) by 20 feet (6.1 m). There was accommodation for 300 worshippers. The stone font was made by Mr Seager of Coventry. It was destroyed on 14 November 1940 during the Coventry Blitz and four of the fire watchers were killed. The destruction left only one course of stones standing. Some of the people seeking shelter in the church crypt were killed or injured. Following the church's destruction, the parishioners resorted to using a wooden hall for worship and social activities.

The £40,000 replacement church was designed by Richard Twentyman of Lavender, Twentyman and Percy of Wolverhampton and was built by E. Fletcher Ltd. of Kingswinford. On 26 September 1953, the foundation stone was laid by the Bishop of Singapore, the Right Rev. Henry Baines, who was the vicar of the old St Nicholas' from 1938 to 1941. The new church was consecrated by the Bishop of Coventry, the Right Rev. Neville Gorton, on 11 September 1955. He called it a church of "startling nobility".

The new church was built of reinforced concrete faced with yellow brick. The side walls sloped inwards at an angle of 10 degrees. Below the copper-covered concrete roof was a nave ceiling made from beechwood. The nave and chancel were undivided and the north aisle included a Lady Chapel and baptistery. The stone font was rescued from the old church of 1874. The church had seated accommodation for around 430 people, with the nave designed to allow all parts to have an uninterrupted view of the altar. The 70-foot high campanile was built of brick and contained a recess for two bells. At its base was a low relief carving of St. Nicholas in Portland stone. An extension was added to the south-east side of the church in about 1964, to provide a new choir vestry, committee room, cloakroom, lobby and lavatory accommodation.

The original church hall was the same wooden hall used by parishioners after the 1940 bombing of the old church and was considered temporary until funds allowed for its replacement. The hall was destroyed by fire on the night of 30 May 1966, causing between £15,000 and £20,000 worth of damage. In 1967, a £15,500 prefabricated concrete building was erected as its replacement. It was sited closer to the church and was able to seat up to 290 people.

In 1992, the church was designated by the City of Coventry as a locally listed building.

Due to its deteriorating condition and weathering, the church was vacated in 2009, when services were moved into the church hall. In 2024, Coventry City Council approved plans for the demolition of the church and the redevelopment of the site with a 38-bed care home. It was considered economically unviable to repair the former church. Demolition work was carried out in October and November 2024. The church's bells, plaque and cross were retained and returned to the diocese for future use. The font was relocated to the church hall.

== Organ ==
The church was equipped with a pipe organ by Nicholson & Co Ltd dating from 1955. A specification of the organ can be found on the National Pipe Organ Register.
