= Thomas Walter Francis Newton =

English architect (1862–1903)

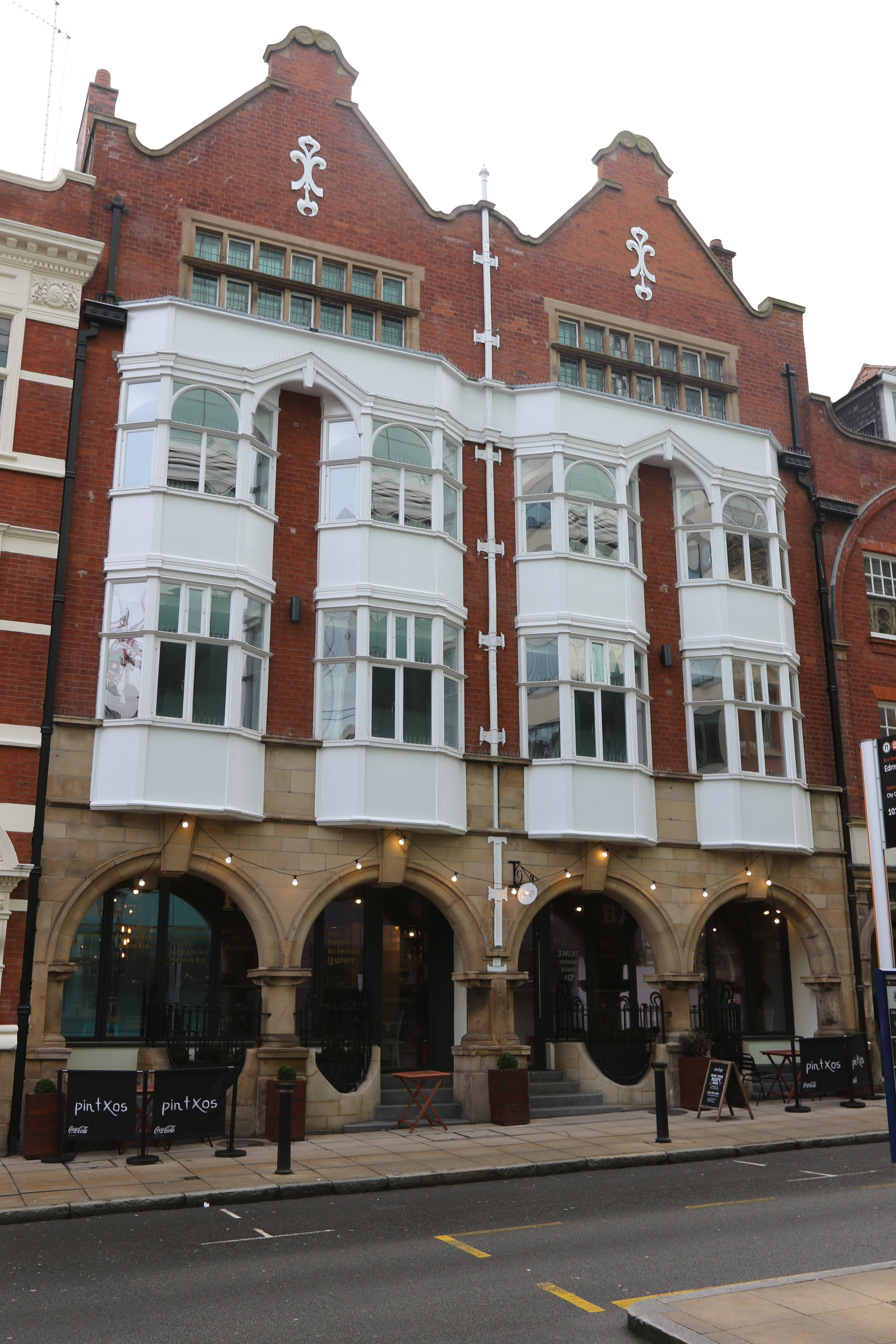
Offices of Newton and Cheatle at 125-131 Edmund Street, Birmingham 1898-1900

Thomas Walter Francis Newton (1862 – 22 January 1903) was an architect based in Birmingham.

== Career ==
Newton was born in Wiveliscombe, Somerset, United Kingdom in 1862 and educated at Taunton Independent College. He was articled to Frank Barlow Osborn and Alfred Reading in Birmingham,.

He set up in business by himself and entered into partnership with Alfred Edward Cheatle around 1891.

He married Fanny Jane Wakeman in 1890. He died of pneumonia on 22 January 1903 at Quarry Farm, Northfield, Birmingham.

== List of works ==
- 134 Edmund Street, Birmingham 1895
- 37 and 39 Church Street, Birmingham 1898
- City Arcade, Union Street, Birmingham 1898-1901
- 121-123 Edmund Street, Birmingham 1899
- 125-131 St Edward's Chambers, Birmingham 1899
- 56-60 Newhall Street, Birmingham 1900
- 41 and 43 Church Street, Birmingham 1900
- 95 Cornwall Street, Birmingham 1901
- 93 Cornwall Street, Birmingham 1902
- Fighting Cocks public house, Moseley, Birmingham 1903
