= Fighting Cocks, Moseley =

Fighting Cocks
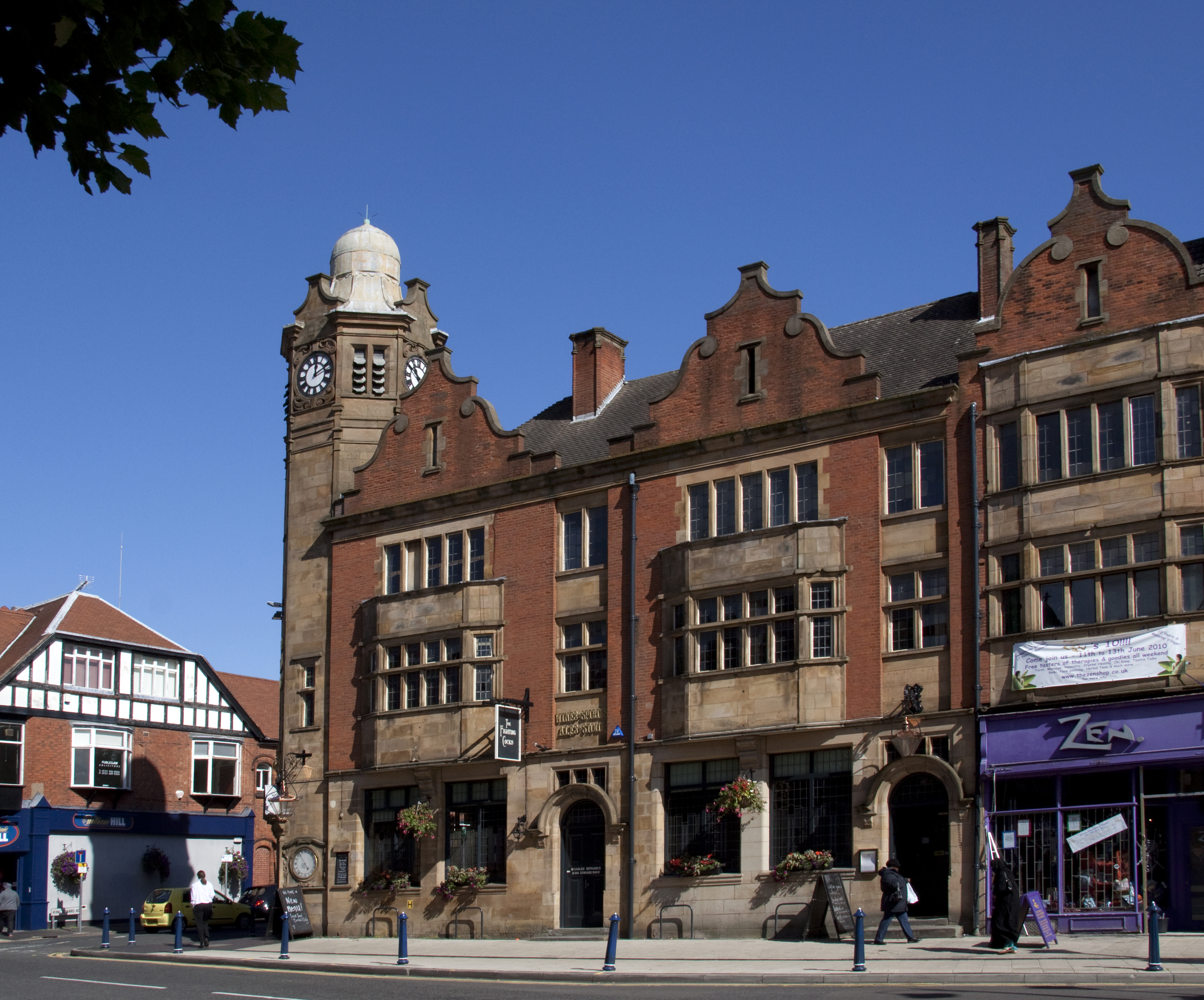
- Fighting Cocks
- Interactive map of the Fighting Cocks area

General information
- Type: Public house
- Architectural style: Arts and Crafts
- Location: Moseley, Birmingham, England
- Coordinates: 52°26′48″N 1°53′16″W
- Construction started: 1903
- Completed: 1903
- Client: Holt Brewery Company

Design and construction
- Architects: Newton & Cheatle
- Awards and prizes: Grade II listed

The Fighting Cocks is a Grade II listed public house in Moseley, Birmingham, England.

== History ==
The public house by this name in Moseley was first recorded in 1759, when on Boxing Day, a cock-fighting event took place between gentlemen from Warwickshire and Worcestershire.

The earlier public house was demolished when King Edward Road was formed off Alcester Road. This building was erected in 1903 to the designs of the architects Thomas Walter Francis Newton and Alfred Edward Cheatle. It was built in the Arts and Crafts style.
