= Lickey Grange =

Coordinates: 52.368178°N 2.02584°W

Lickey Grange is a Victorian house and estate in the village of Marlbrook, Bromsgrove District, Worcestershire, near Birmingham, England. Car manufacturer Herbert Austin lived there for 31 years. It later became a residential school and is now private housing.

== Early history ==
Lickey Grange was built for Birmingham solicitor Joseph Rowlands in 1880. A large gabled brick house, it had largely symmetrical fronts on both the entrance and garden sides. The style and appearance of the house is that of a large suburban villa rather than a true country house. Although the architect is unknown, it was probably designed by one of the large Birmingham firms whose main output was commercial work.

== Herbert Austin ==
Herbert Austin had worked as an Engineer at the Wolseley Sheep Shearing Company in Australia before returning to England with his Australian wife in 1893 to become Manager of its manufacturing operations in Aston, Birmingham. In 1901, Austin established the Wolseley Tool and Motor Company; and he designed its first car. Austin left the Wolseley Tool and Motor company in 1905, and brought two former Wolseley designers with him to his new Austin Motor Company at Longbridge, which was then in the Worcestershire countryside. However, he continued working for the Wolseley Sheep and Shearing Company, and was Chairman from 1911 to 1931.

Between 1893 and 1910, Herbert Austin had lived in various parts of Birmingham. In 1910, his family of two daughters and a son, moved to Lickey Grange, which included 100 acres (40 ha) of surrounding land, and a lodge. Austin spent the rest of his life there.

The Austin 7 was designed at Lickey Grange between 1921 and 1922 in the billiards room (but not on the billiards table!). This was a 7 horsepower (hp) car. It had been designed in private, at Sir Herbert Austin's expense, at Lickey Grange because the other directors of the Austin Motor company preferred bigger 12 hp-engined cars and were against the idea of a "small" car. Herbert Austin patented some of the features and so gained a royalty for every Austin 7 sold by the company. Stanley Edge, the young design draughtsman who worked for Sir Herbert, lived at the Lodge, but ate his meals in the adjoining library.

Herbert Austin died in 1941 and was buried in the graveyard of Holy Trinity Church, Lickey. The Grange was later sold.

== Birmingham Royal Institution for the Blind ==
The Birmingham Royal Institution for the Blind (BRIB), a charity, then took over Lickey Grange and the first pupils moved-in in March 1953. The BRIB's school had previously been at Carpenter Road, Edgbaston, Birmingham, but this site was acquired by the BBC, (firstly for Outside broadcasting in 1954, then the Regional HQ in 1955), forcing the move to Lickey Grange.

The BRIB kept the house much the same as it had been, but the grounds were developed to meet the needs of a residential school. Individual houses were built for teachers, Hostel blocks were built for the pupils, plus an assembly hall, indoor swimming pool and class rooms.

The school catered for a mixture of residential and day pupils. Until the 1980's, there were more residential pupils than day pupils; however changes in the methods of education - integration - led to a large drop in the numbers of children being sent to the school.

== Redevelopment ==
The house is Victorian with the large rooms, such as a library and a billiards room. After the BRIB vacated the site it was redeveloped with teachers' houses nearest to the Old Birmingham Road sold off first. The rest of the site is now a gated community of up-market homes.

=== Access ===
Lickey Grange is accessed from the Old Birmingham Road (B4096). The B4096 appears to have once formed the route of the A38, but the A38 now bypasses Lickey.
