= St Martin's Church, Parkfields =

St Martin of Tours’ Church, Wolverhampton
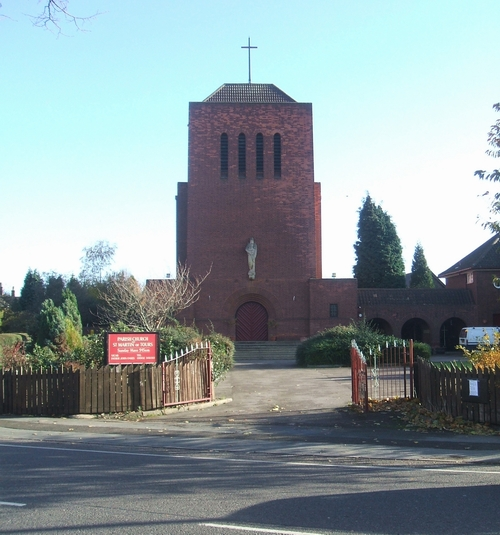
- St Martin of Tours’ Church, Wolverhampton
- St Martin of Tours’ Church, Wolverhampton
- 52°34′8.28″N 2°6′59.44″W
- OS grid reference: SO 92234 96821
- Location: Wolverhampton
- Country: England
- Denomination: Church of England
- Churchmanship: Catholic
- Website: stmartinschurch.wolverhamptonchurches.co.uk

History
- Dedication: St Martin of Tours
- Consecrated: 1939

Architecture
- Heritage designation: Grade II listed
- Architect: Richard Twentyman
- Groundbreaking: 1938
- Completed: 1939

Administration
- Diocese: Diocese of Lichfield
- Archdeaconry: Walsall
- Deanery: Wolverhampton
- Parish: St Martin Rough Hills

St Martin of Tours’ Church, Wolverhampton is a Grade II listed parish church in the Church of England in Wolverhampton.

== History ==
The church was built in 1939 by the architect Richard Twentyman. Pevsner describes it as impressively blocky. It was built on the site of an old mine. The foundations of the church were made of reinforced concrete to a depth of 12 ft. It comprises a 2 bay chancel, and 6 bay nave with low aisles.

The statue of St Martin on the tower is by the sculptor Don Potter, who also designed the font and pulpit. The altar rails, door furniture, grilles and windows were by a local firm, James Gibbons Ltd.
