= St Catherine's Church, Nechells =

- St Catherine's Church, Nechells
- 52°29′39″N 1°52′24.5″W
- Location: Birmingham
- Country: England
- Denomination: Church of England

History
- Dedication: Saint Catherine of Alexandria
- Consecrated: 1878

Architecture
- Architect(s): Frank Barlow Osborn and Alfred Reading
- Completed: 1878
- Construction cost: £7,000
- Closed: 1945

Specifications
- Capacity: 756

St Catherine's Church, Scholefield Street, Nechells is a former Church of England parish church in Birmingham.

== History ==
The foundation stone was laid on 27 July 1877 and the church was built to designs by Frank Barlow Osborn and Alfred Reading. It was consecrated on 9 November 1878 by the Bishop of Worcester.

A parish was assigned of St Clement's Church, Nechells in 1879.

The church was damaged in an air raid during the Second World War and closed formally in 1945. The parish was united with that of St Matthew's Church, Duddeston and Nechells and the church was subsequently demolished.

== Organ ==
An organ by Henry Jones was installed in 1878. A specification of the organ can be found on the National Pipe Organ Register.
