= Daimler Green =

Village in the West Midlands, England

Coordinates: 52.422735°N 1.515880°W

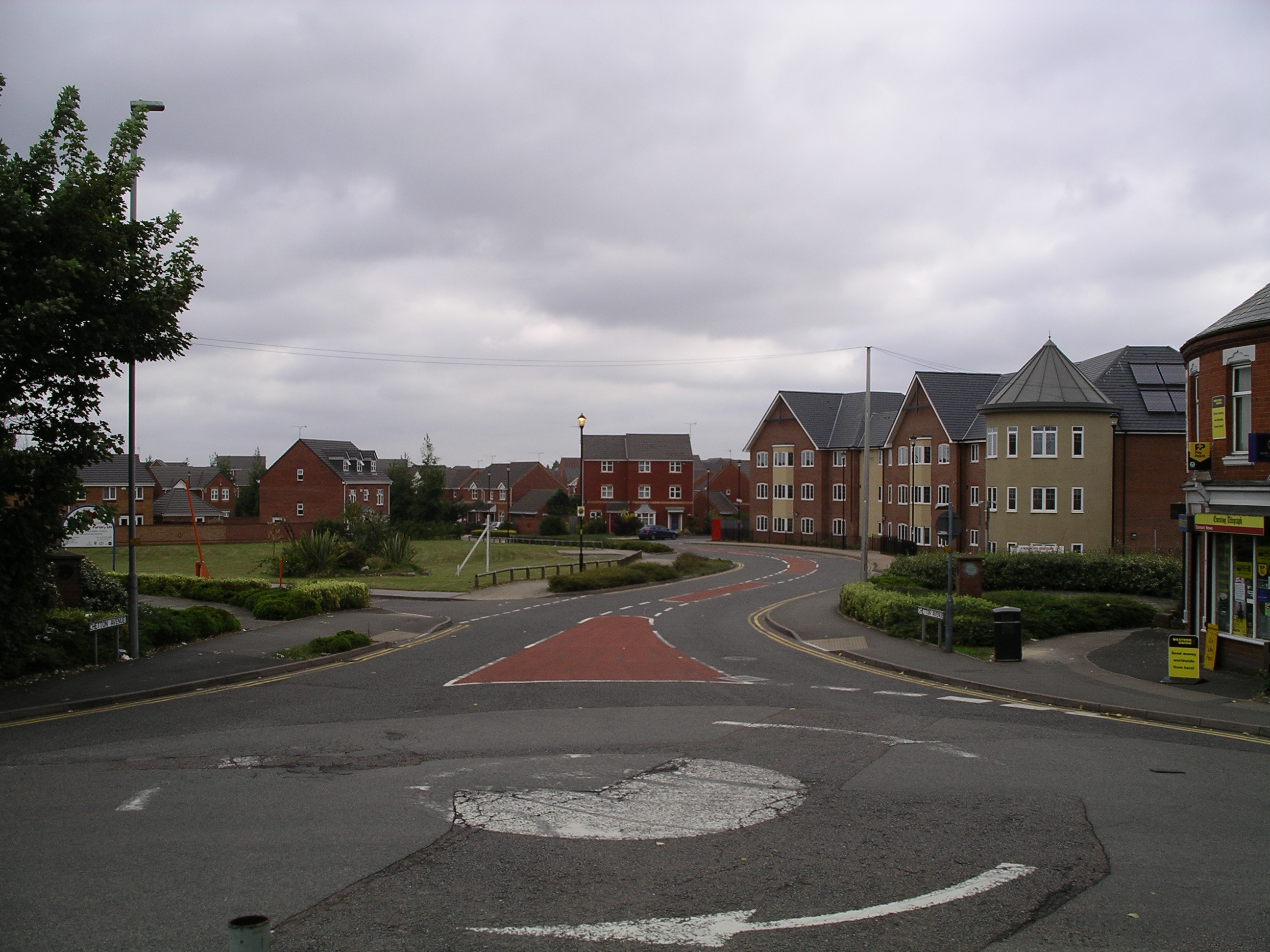
- Daimler Green, Coventry

- Location within the West Midlands
- Metropolitan county: West Midlands
- Region: West Midlands
- Country: England
- Sovereign state: United Kingdom

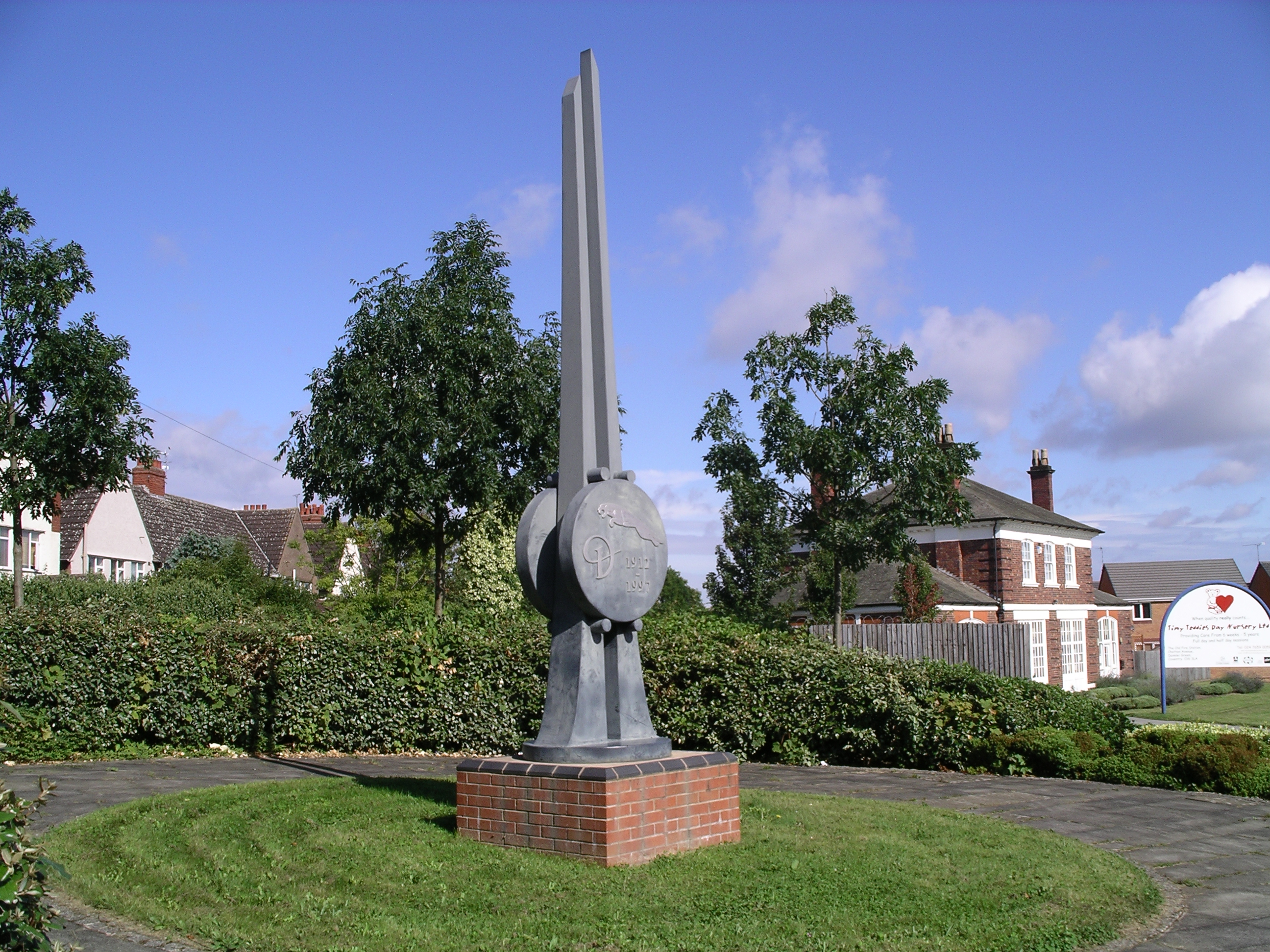
The statue indicating that a Daimler factory stood on the Daimler Green site from 1912 to 1997

Daimler Green is an urban village about two miles north of Coventry city centre, in the West Midlands, England.

It was built on the site of the Daimler car factory in Radford. A railway station, named Daimler Halt was provided for the factory workers but closed in 1965. The factory itself closed in 1997 and was quickly demolished. The urban village was approved for redevelopment in 1999 and the first residential properties were occupied in 2000.
