= All Saints' Church, Darlaston =

All Saints’ Church, Darlaston
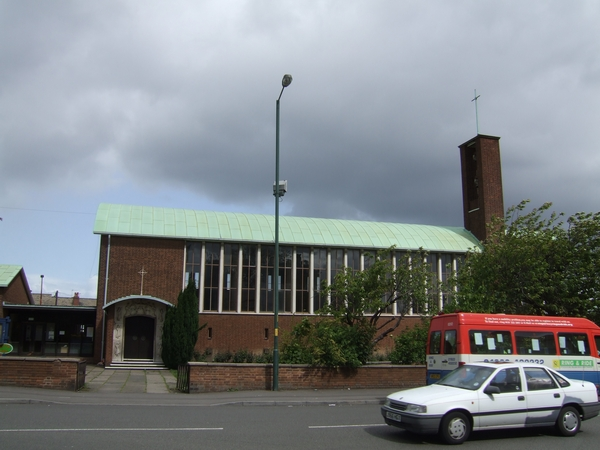
- All Saints’ Church, Darlaston
- All Saints’ Church, Darlaston
- 52°34′10.1″N 2°1′34.39″W
- OS grid reference: SO 98323 96836
- Location: Darlaston
- Country: England
- Denomination: Church of England

History
- Dedication: All Saints
- Consecrated: 1952

Architecture
- Heritage designation: Grade II
- Designated: 22 February 2016
- Architect: Richard Twentyman
- Groundbreaking: 1951
- Completed: 1952

Specifications
- Length: 120 feet (37 m)
- Width: 45 feet (14 m)
- Height: 56 feet (17 m)

Administration
- Diocese: Diocese of Lichfield
- Archdeaconry: Walsall
- Deanery: Wednesbury
- Parish: All Saints Darlaston

All Saints’ Church, Darlaston is a parish church in the Church of England in Darlaston, West Midlands County, England.

== History ==
The first church by George Edmund Street dated from 1872. It was erected as a memorial to Samuel Mills, and lavishly furnished with stained glass windows designed by Edward Burne-Jones. An All Saints' football club fielded a team in the 1879-80 & 1880-81 Birmingham Senior Cup.

The first church was destroyed by a bomb in the Second World War on 31 July 1942.

The replacement church was started in 1951 by the architect Richard Twentyman and dedicated on 4 October 1952 by the Bishop of Lichfield. The church tower containing two bells is 56 feet (17 m) high. The main body of the church is 120 feet (37 m) long by 45 feet (14 m) wide.

The east end of the church is dominated by a tapestry designed by Stephen Lee, and the stone reliefs on the main door are by Don Potter.

The church was listed at Grade II by Historic England on 22 February 2016.

== Organ ==
The church is equipped with a pipe organ by John Compton. A specification of the organ can be found on the National Pipe Organ Register.
