= St Clement's Church, Nechells =

St Clement’s Church, Nechells
- St Clement’s Church, Nechells
- 52°29′58″N 1°52′1.5″W
- OS grid reference: SP 09119 89066
- Location: Nechells
- Country: England
- Denomination: Church of England

History
- Dedication: St Clement
- Consecrated: 1859

Architecture
- Architect: J.A. Chatwin
- Groundbreaking: 1859
- Completed: 1860
- Demolished: 1978

St Clement's Church, Nechells was a former parish church in the Church of England in Birmingham.

== History ==
The church was the first designed by the architect J.A. Chatwin. It was consecrated by the Bishop of Worcester on 30 August 1859.

Aris's Birmingham Gazette describes the building as a "handsome ecclesiastical edifice .... in the Geometric style of Gothic architecture", with accommodation for 852 persons. Its cost was £3500, including the architect's fee of £300. "Considering the outlay, the design is thought to be the most successful and one of the cheapest of the new Churches in Birmingham.". An alternative categorization of St. Clement's architecture describes its "rose window, doorways and octagonal turret with gabled spirelet as being in the early Decorated style."

Just over a century later, Nicholas Pevsner's comment on the building and its architect was "As usual with [Chatwin], a very thorough though uninspiring Gothic design".

Two of Chatwin's architectural drawings for St Clement's, showing the ground plan and the gallery are available online.

St Clement's became a parish in its own right when a parish was assigned out of St Matthew's Church, Duddeston and Nechells in 1860. Part of the parish was taken in 1879 to form the parish of St Catherine's Church, Nechells.

The church was declared redundant in 1975 and demolished by 1978.

The attached hall of 1887, designed by William Jenkins, still survives.

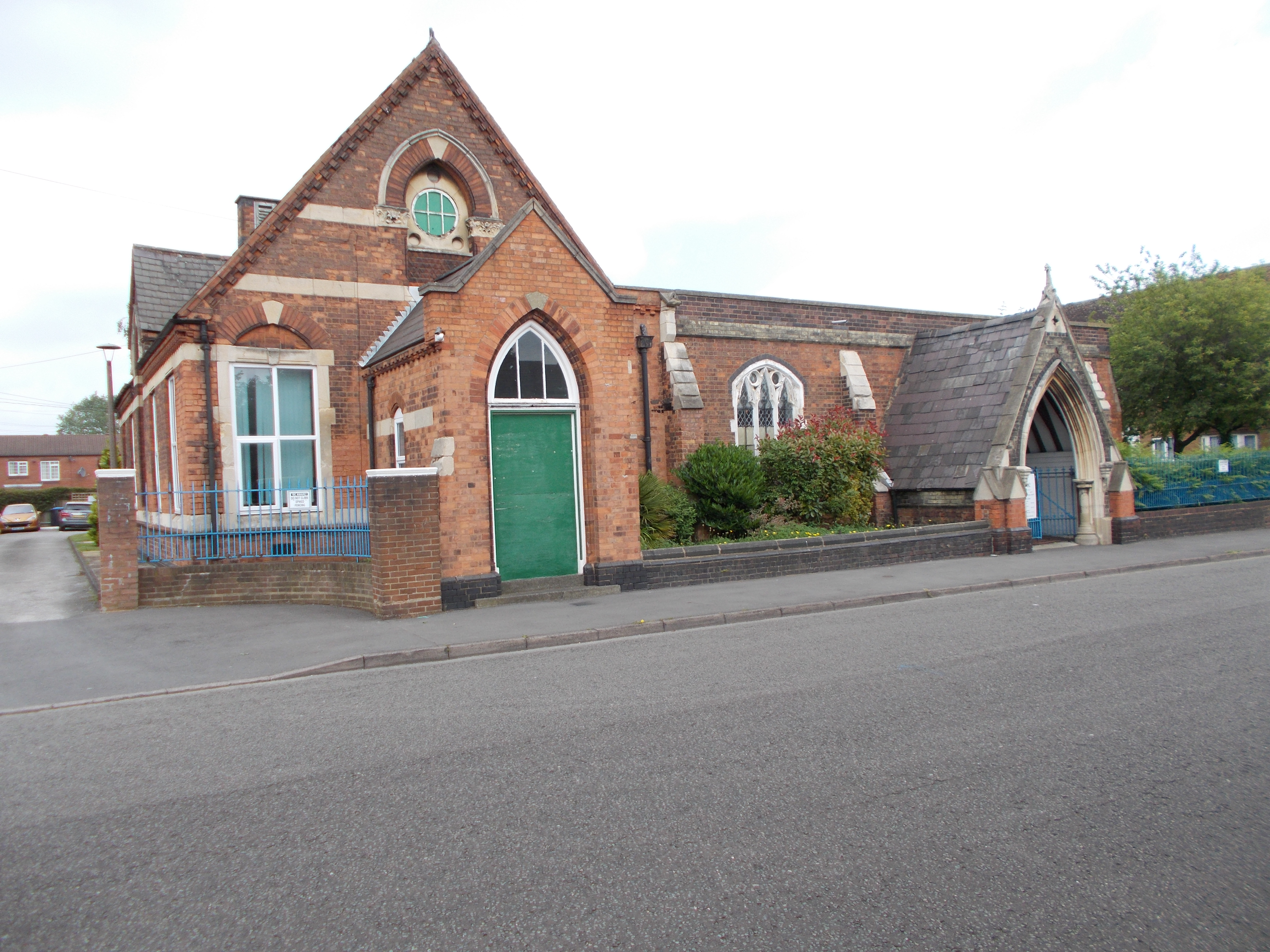
The surviving buildings of St Clement's on Stuart Street pictured in 2014 (with the church hall to the left of the main porch), now used by the Birmingham Victory Unity Centre.

== Organ ==
The church was equipped with a pipe organ by Bewsher and Fleetwood from St James’ Church, Liverpool. A specification of the organ can be found on the National Pipe Organ Register.

It was rebuilt in 1907 by Halmshaw and King. The subsequent fate of the organ, following the church's demolition, is not known.
