= St Gabriel's Church, Walsall =

Coordinates: 52.5653°N 1.9731°W

- Parish Church of St Gabriel, Walsall
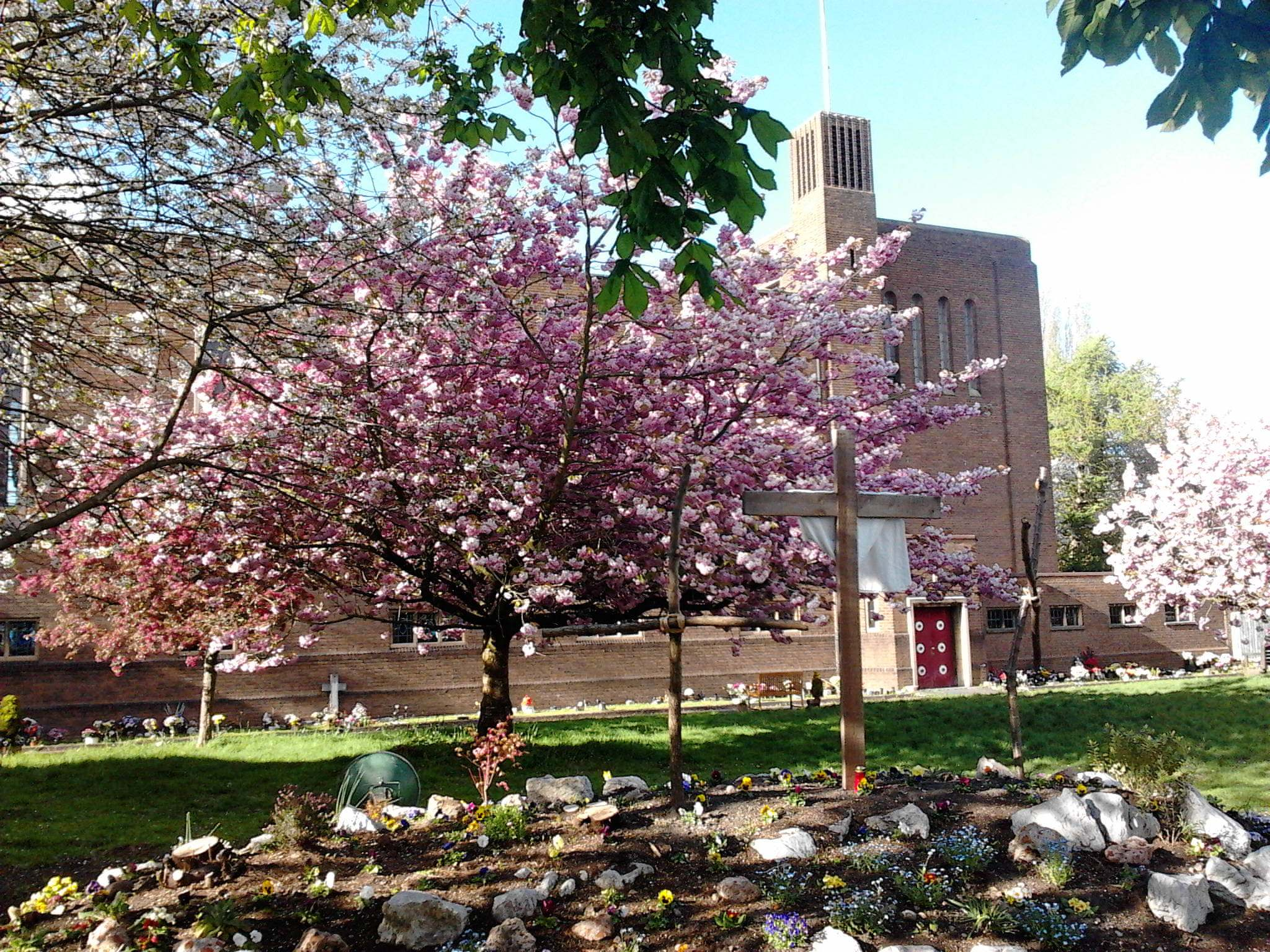
- St Gabriel's Church, Walsall
- OS grid reference: SP 01920 96384
- Country: England
- Denomination: Church of England
- Churchmanship: Traditional Catholic
- Website: www.stgabrielschurchfullbrook.com

History
- Dedication: St Gabriel
- Consecrated: 4 February 1939

Architecture
- Architect: Richard Twentyman
- Style: Art deco

Administration
- Province: Canterbury
- Diocese: Lichfield
- Archdeaconry: Walsall
- Deanery: Walsall
- Parish: St. Gabriel, Fullbrook, Walsall

Clergy
- Bishop: Rt Revd Paul Thomas SSC (AEO)
- Vicar: Fr Mark McIntyre CMP SSC

St Gabriel's Church is a Church of England parish church in Walsall, West Midlands. Its parish includes Fullbrook, Caldmore, Bescot, The Delves, Palfrey, and Tamebridge and Yew Tree.

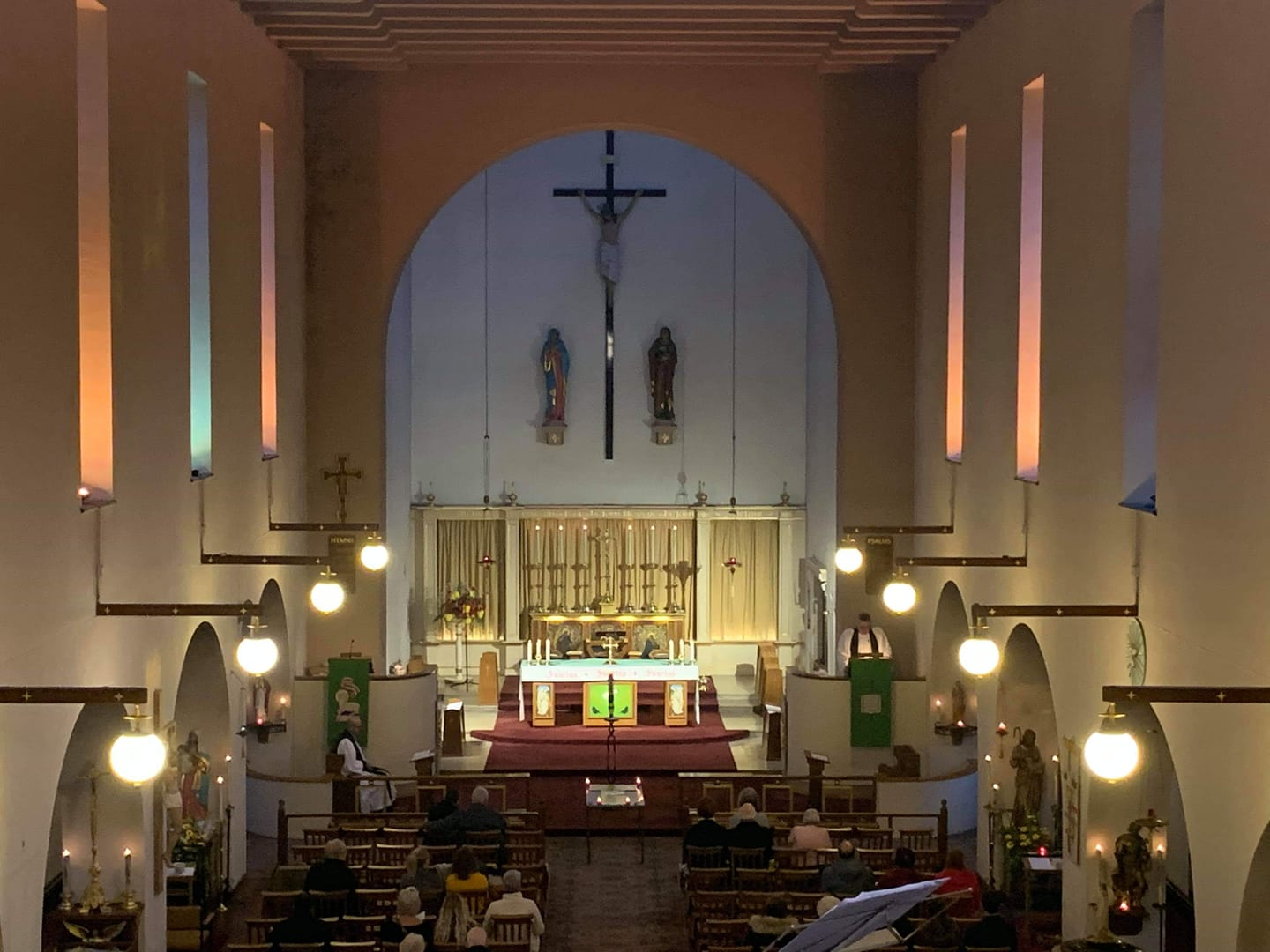
St Gabriel's Nave and Sanctuary

== Tradition ==
The tradition of the Church is part of the Traditional Catholic movement in the Church of England. Therefore, the Church is under the Alternative Episcopal Oversight of the Bishop of Oswestry (the current bishop being Rt Revd Paul Thomas SSC.

== History ==
=== Origins and Early Development ===
The origins of St. Gabriel's Church in Fullbrook trace back to 1850 when a small chapel was constructed on Delves Common. This chapel, dedicated to the Good Shepherd, was established to serve the local farming families and labourers. It functioned as a chapel-of-ease to St. Bartholomew's Church in Wednesbury and was officially opened on 13 September 1850. The brick-built chapel, which cost £315, featured simple lancet windows and had seating for around 100 people. The building also included a small chancel just large enough to house a small altar, and the entire structure was lit by oil lamps.

In 1885, a schoolroom was added to the chapel to further serve the local community. This addition occurred during the period when Delves was part of the parish of St. Paul's, Wood Green, from 1875 to 1936. Despite developments in the surrounding area, the chapel remained a focal point for local worship.

=== Formation of the Conventional District ===
By the 1930s, the rapid expansion of Walsall, driven by housing developments in The Delves, necessitated the formation of a new parish. This led to the creation of the Conventional District of Fullbrook in 1936, which combined areas from the nearby parishes of St. Matthew's, Walsall, St. Michael's, Caldmore, St. Mary and All Saints, Palfrey, and St. Paul's, Wood Green. Reverend Alexander Fraser was appointed as the first Curate-in-Charge of the new district. Before this appointment, Fraser had served in curacies at St. Peter's, Blackburn, and St. Aidan's, Leeds. The Good Shepherd Chapel, along with its schoolroom, continued to serve as the central place of worship for the growing community.

By 1938, the population of the area had increased significantly, with around 1,500 houses already built and a population nearing 7,000. With an additional 1,200 homes planned, the need for a larger church became apparent.

=== Construction of St. Gabriel's Church ===
The construction of St. Gabriel's Church in Fullbrook was significantly influenced by Revd John Fenwick Laing, a former vicar of St. Michael's, Caldmore. Revd Laing, who served until 1921, had foreseen the need for a new parish and bequeathed £12,000 in his will for the creation of a separate parish and the construction of a church. This sum, invested and accruing interest, was utilised when the time came to build the new church.

A one-acre site on Walstead Road, near the Full Brook, was selected for the new church. The architectural firm Lavender and Twentyman of Wolverhampton was appointed to design the building, with Deacon and Boardman serving as the builders. Revd Alex Fraser proposed that the church be dedicated to St. Gabriel, the fellow archangel to St. Michael, in honor of Laing's legacy as both the founder and benefactor.

On 19 March 1938, the foundation stone for St. Gabriel's Church was laid by The Right Reverend Edward Woods, Bishop of Lichfield. Photographs from the day show the foundation stone being blessed by Bishop Edward Woods, who was dressed in his rochet and accompanied by two priests in tunicles.

Lavender and Twentyman designed the church with a focus on modern ideas of inclusivity, emphasizing the unity of the congregation and clergy. The chancel was deliberately kept short to enhance visibility from the nave, and it was designed as a tower to allow ample light, with a plain black marble cross on the east wall.

The building's foundation was constructed with concrete, and the main structure was built using brick. However, work was briefly delayed when a shipment of bricks was commandeered by the Office of Works. The church featured coping stones and window surrounds made from durable Clipsham stone, and the roof was constructed from concrete and steel, insulated with cork and topped with an asphalt waterproof layer. Once the roof was completed, the interior was plastered and finished with a textured sponge technique.

During construction, the parish began assembling the necessary furnishings and fittings, from hymn boards and kneeling mats to more significant items like the processional cross, sanctuary lamps, and altar vessels. One notable feature was the installation of a carillon of tubular chimes, the first of its kind in the country. Operated from a small keyboard, the chimes were housed in a sound-insulated cupboard, with their sound amplified and broadcast outside via a microphone system. However, the carillon required frequent maintenance and was eventually taken out of use, though it remains in its original cupboard. The original Hammond electric organ, on the other hand, proved to be a reliable fixture, serving the church for nearly 40 years with minimal issues.

In March 2022 the organ was dismantled in preparations for the installation of a new hybrid organ, which was then later blessed and dedicated on 4 February 2023.

=== Consecration of the Church ===
By Christmas 1938, preparations for the new church in Fullbrook were nearly complete. Revd Fraser sent out invitations to all residents within the newly defined parish boundaries, inviting them to the consecration ceremony.

The consecration took place on Saturday, 4 February 1939. The procession began at the Walstead Road schools (now Delves Infant Nursery School in Botany Road). Led by the processional cross, a procession of choir members, clergy, and Bishop Edward Woods, made its way along Walstead Road to the new church. The building was filled to capacity, with many unable to secure tickets waiting outside. However, those outside were able to listen to the service through a loudspeaker installed in the belfry.

Upon arrival, the procession made a complete circuit of the church building before halting at the south porch, where the doors were ceremonially shut in the Bishop's face. As part of the ritual, the Bishop struck the doors three times with the base of his processional staff. After receiving the keys from Norman Coxon, the People's Warden, he unlocked the doors and entered the church. A press photograph from the event captures a densely packed crowd outside the porch, with the processional cross emerging above them and the Bishop, silhouetted under the porch arch, towering over the gathering.

Once inside, the Bishop led the opening prayers and responses. The petition for consecration was read by Les Taylor, the Vicar's Warden. Fully robed in a blue and gold cope and mitre, the Bishop then proceeded to bless key areas of the church, stopping at the font, lectern, chancel steps, pulpit, and Lady Chapel. At each location, a short New Testament reading was given, followed by a special benediction. Upon reaching the high altar, the Bishop prayed and laid his hands upon it, after which the congregation sang the hymn, "We Love the Place, O God, Wherein Thine Honour Dwells."

Following this, the Bishop directed the diocesan registrar to read the Deed of Consecration, which Bishop Woods signed. He then traced the cross on a stone with the base of his staff, making a formal declaration to the congregation. Although only a portion of the Bishop's address was preserved by a local reporter from the Walsall Observer and South Staffordshire Chronicle, the significance of the event was keenly felt by all present.

The following day, which was Septuagesima Sunday, the Bishop returned to the church to celebrate at 9 a.m., thus completing the full consecration rite.

== Clergy ==
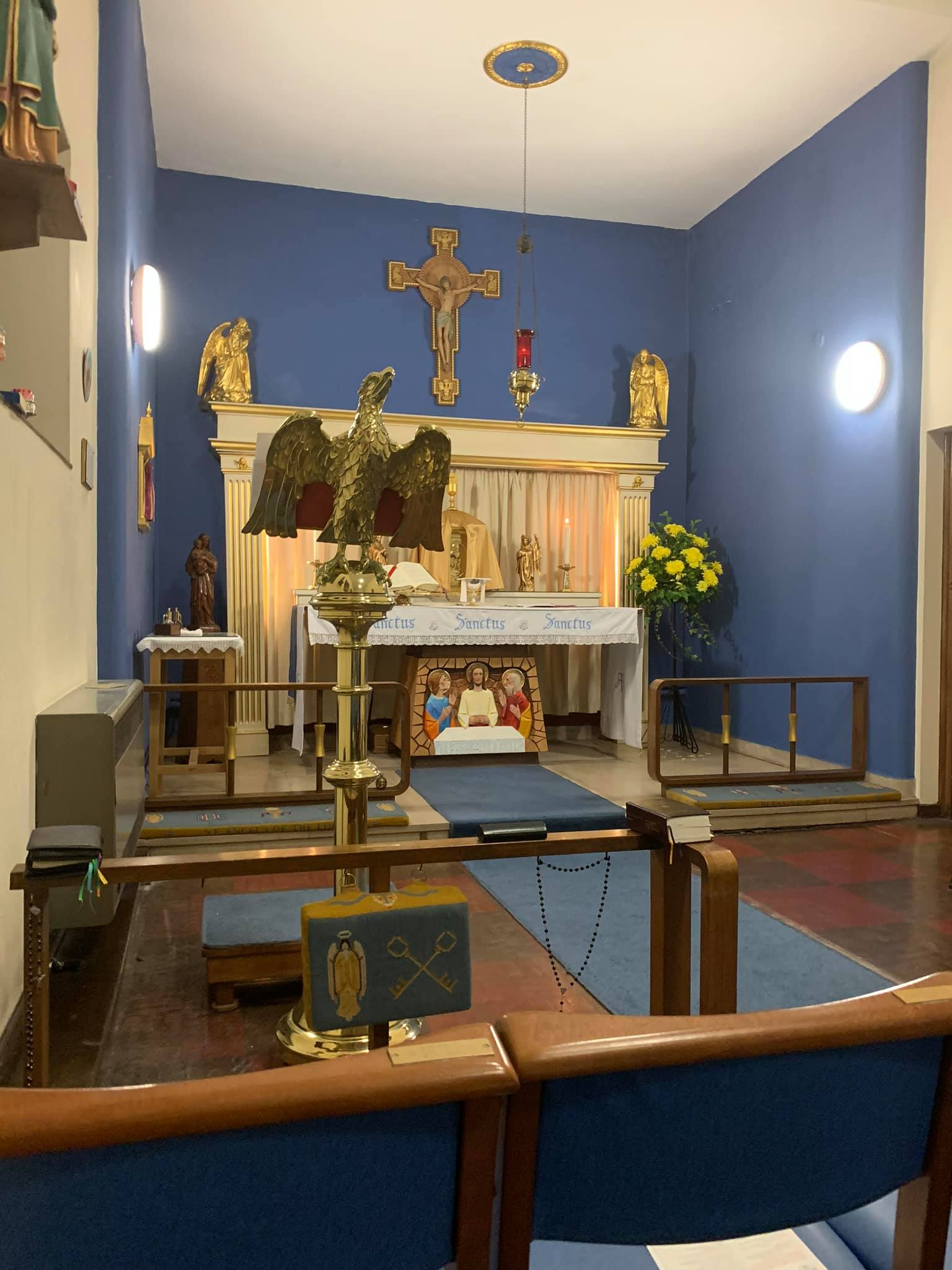
The Lady Chapel of St Gabriel's

=== Vicars who have served St Gabriel's ===
- 1935 – 1948 Fr A. Fraser
- 1948 – 1954 Fr J. McCullough
- 1954 – 1971 Fr S. Thomas
- 1972 – 2010 Fr T R H Coyne
- 2011–present Rev Prebendary Mark McIntyre CMP SSC

=== Assistant Priests ===
- 1958 – 1961 Fr E Booth
- 1967 – 1970 Fr K Hill
- 1970 – 1973 Fr H Pascoe
- 1974 – 1977 Fr N Clapp
- 1977 – 1978 Fr C Marshall
- 1980 – 1983 Fr B Williams
- 1988 – 1990 Fr G Matthews
- 1990 Fr D Pearce
- 1995 – 2004 Fr W Poultney
- 2000 – 2003 Fr E Davies
- 2005 – 2010 Fr N Pierce
- 2013 – 2016 Fr S Oakes
- 2019 – 2022 Fr R Hume

== Sources ==
- "Walsall: Churches". British History Online.
