= Alfred Edward Cheatle =

English architect

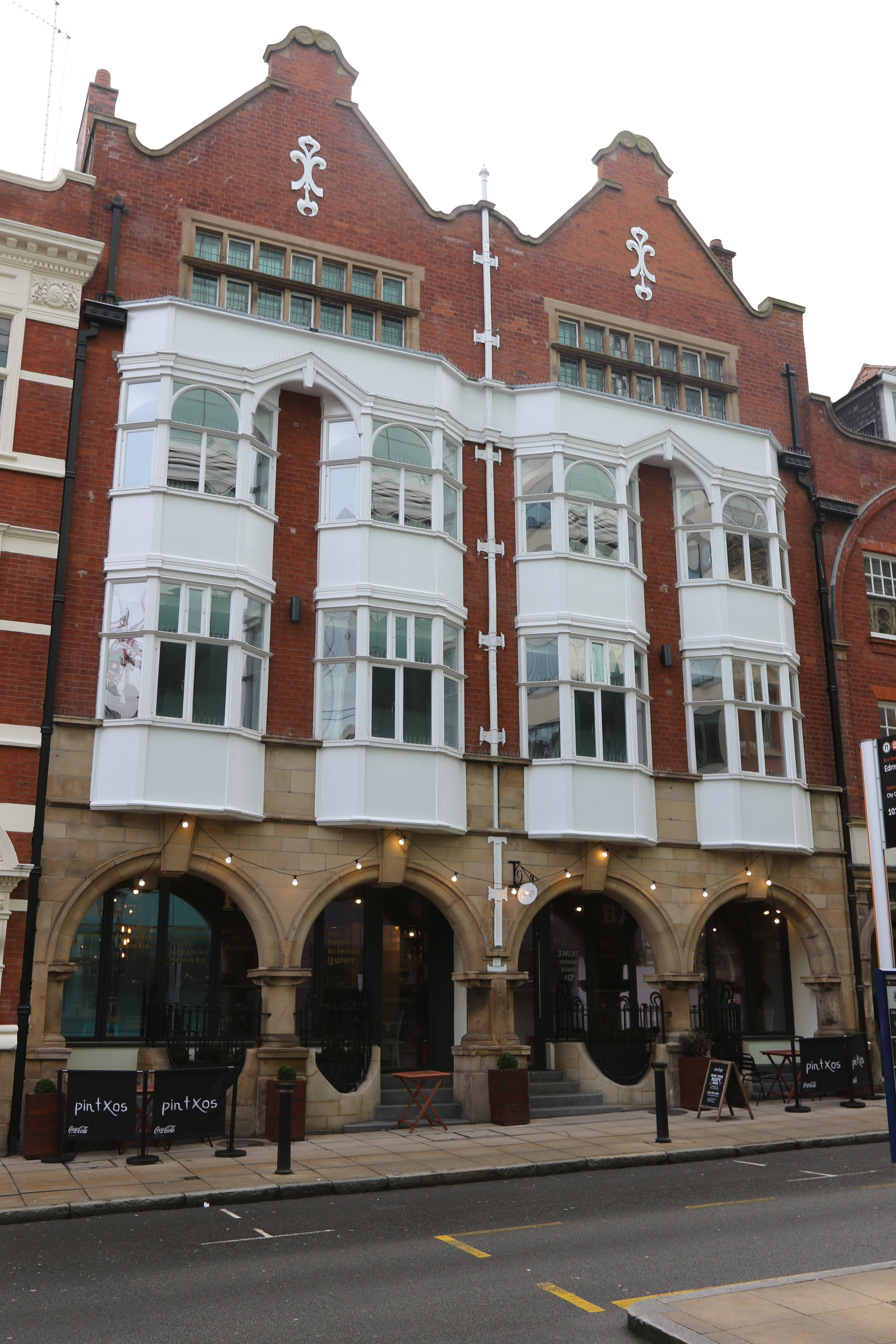
Offices of Newton and Cheatle at 125-131 Edmund Street, Birmingham 1898-1900

Alfred Edward Robie Farmer Cheatle (Born Dosthill, Warwickshire 15 January 1871 - 29 November 1941 Woodleigh Nursing Home, Wylde Green) was an architect based in Birmingham.

== Life and career ==
Cheatle was the son of Thomas Farmer Cheatle (1840-1918) and Mary Sarsons (b. 1838). He entered into a partnership around 1891 with Thomas Walter Francis Newton as his partner, and until the death of Newton in 1903, they traded as Newton and Cheatle. Cheatle married Rhoda Beatrice Barker (1872-1956) on 22 May 1901 in Kingsbury, Warwickshire. They had two children, Godfrey Barker and Kathleen Thelma.

Cheatle was for many years chairman of Tamworth Rural District Council. In later life, he lived in Chalford, Four Oaks, Birmingham. He left an estate of £16,329 9s 10d (equivalent to £1,021,500 in 2023).

== List of works ==
- 134 Edmund Street, Birmingham 1895
- 37 and 39 Church Street, Birmingham 1898
- City Arcade, Union Street, Birmingham 1898-1901
- 121-123 Edmund Street, Birmingham 1899
- 125-131 St Edward’s Chambers, Birmingham 1899
- 56-60 Newhall Street, Birmingham 1900
- 41 and 43 Church Street, Birmingham 1900
- 95 Cornwall Street, Birmingham 1901
- 93 Cornwall Street, Birmingham 1902
- Fighting Cocks public house, Moseley, Birmingham 1903
