= Holy Trinity Church, Lickey =

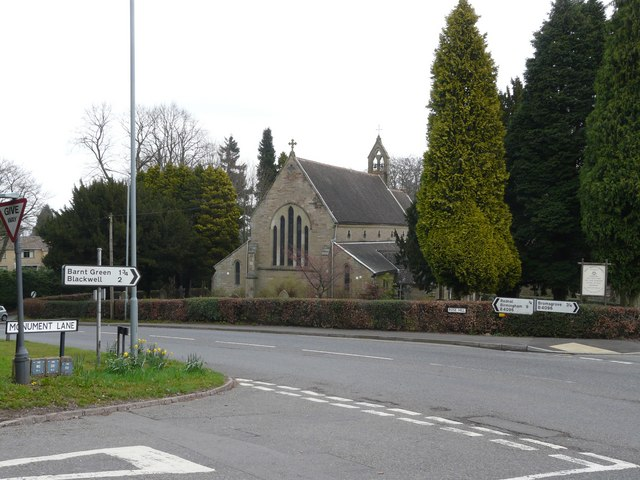
- Holy Trinity Church, Lickey
- Holy Trinity Church, Lickey
- 52°22′30.4″N 2°0′34.74″W
- Location: Lickey
- Country: England
- Denomination: Church of England
- Website: lickeychurch.com

History
- Dedication: Holy Trinity
- Consecrated: 6 June 1856

Architecture
- Architect: Henry Day
- Groundbreaking: 16 May 1855

Administration
- Diocese: Anglican Diocese of Birmingham
- Archdeaconry: Birmingham
- Deanery: Kings Norton
- Parish: The Lickey

Holy Trinity Church, Lickey is a Church of England parish church in Lickey, Worcestershire.

== History ==
The foundation stone was laid on 16 May 1855 by Robert Windsor-Clive (MP). It was built as a chapel of ease to St John the Baptist Church, Bromsgrove. The architect was Henry Day of Worcester and the contractor was John Robinson of Redditch.

The church was consecrated on 6 June 1856 by the Bishop of Worcester.

The church was enlarged between 1893 and 1894 by Alfred Reading of Birmingham when the chancel arch was widened for a new organ chamber and vestry. The vestry was built in 1898 and enlarged in 1970.

The church started a mission in Rubery. In 1933 part of the parish was taken to form the new parish of St Chad's Church, Rubery.

== Organ ==
An organ was built by Jon Nicholson and installed in 1856. A specification of the organ can be found on the National Pipe Organ Register.

== Churchyard ==
Herbert Austin, 1st Baron Austin, the automobile designer and builder who founded the Austin Motor Company, lived at nearby Lickey Grange and is buried in the churchyard.
