= St Margaret's Church, Ladywood =

St Margaret’s Church
- St Margaret’s Church
- 52°28′43.6″N 1°55′22.5″W
- Location: Birmingham
- Country: England
- Denomination: Church of England

History
- Dedication: Margaret of Antioch
- Consecrated: 2 October 1875

Architecture
- Architect: Frank Barlow Osborn
- Groundbreaking: 9 May 1874
- Completed: 1875
- Construction cost: £5,000
- Closed: 1957
- Demolished: circa 1957

Specifications
- Capacity: 720 persons
- Length: 80.5 feet (24.5 m)
- Width: 40 feet (12 m)
- Height: 60 feet (18 m)

St Margaret's Church, Ledsam Street, Ladywood is a former Church of England parish church in Birmingham, England.

== History ==
The foundation stone was laid on Saturday 9 May 1874 by the Bishop of Worcester. It was designed by Frank Barlow Osborn and erected by Wilson and Sons of Wandsworth. It was consecrated on 2 October 1875 by the Bishop of Worcester, Henry Philpott.

A parish was assigned out of St John's Church, Ladywood in 1876.

In 1957 the church was closed, and demolished shortly afterwards. The high altar went to St Paul's Church, Grove Park, Chiswick.

== Organ ==
An organ by Noble was installed. A specification of the organ can be found on the National Pipe Organ Register. When St Margaret's Church closed in 1957, the organ was given to St Chad's Church, Rubery, Worcestershire.
