= Moseley Conservation Area =

Conservation area in Birmingham, England

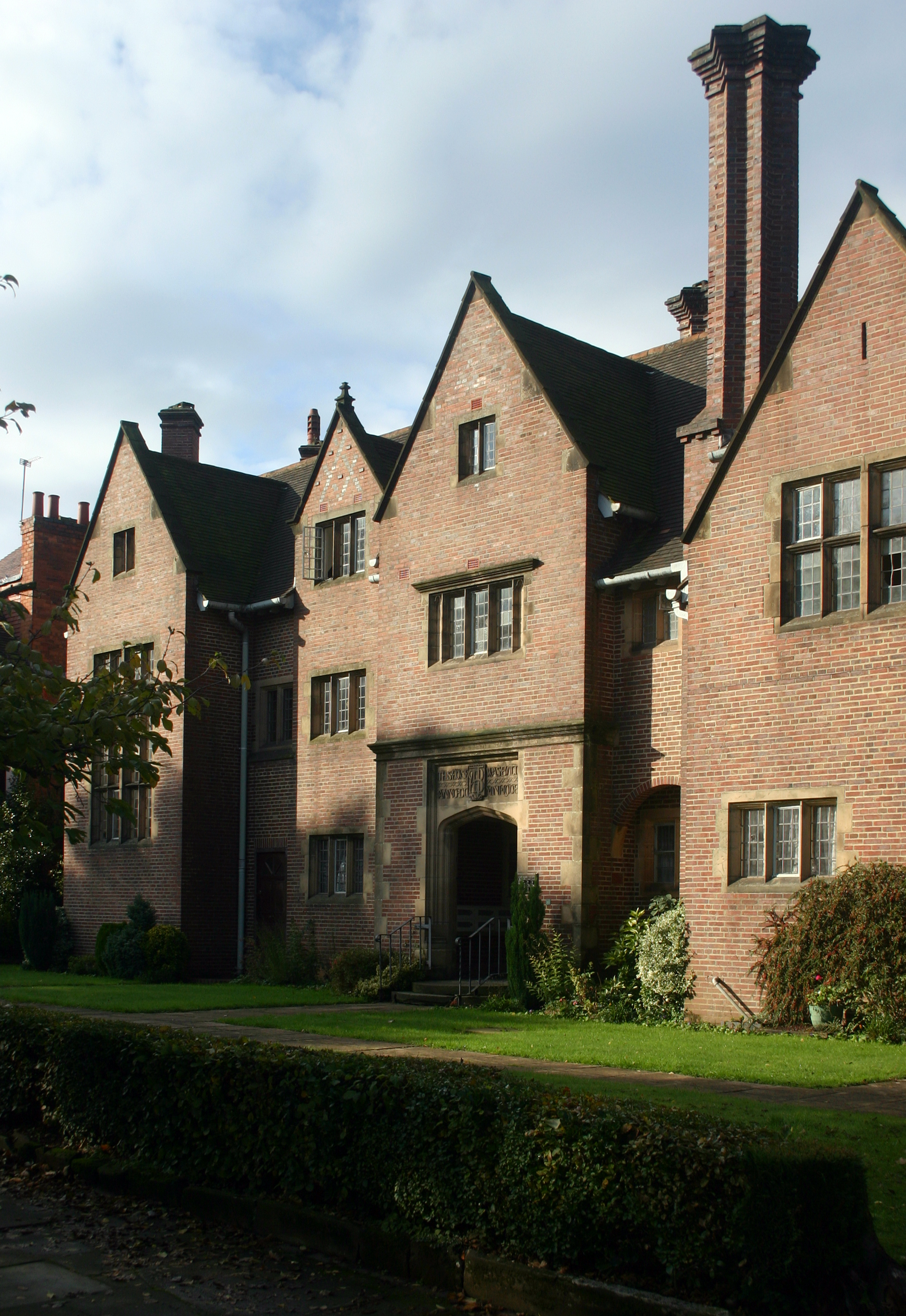
The Hurst, 6 Amesbury Road by William Bidlake 1908

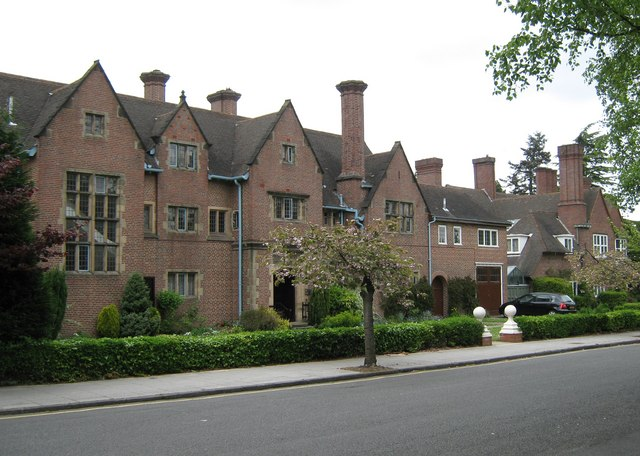
Kilmuir 4 Amesbury Road in the Arts and Crafts style by Owen Parsons 1909

The Moseley Conservation Area is in Moseley, Birmingham.

== Description ==
The conservation area was designated on 17 March 1983. It was extended on 12 November 1987 and 14 March 2005 and now comprises an area covering 95.06 hectares (234.9 acres).

The opening of Moseley railway station in 1867 started a property boom in Moseley, which was accelerated by the arrival of steam driven tramway services to Birmingham provided by the Birmingham Central Tramways Company Ltd which started operating on 29 December 1884. Moseley was an attractive location for the prosperous middle-classes, as it was situated south of Birmingham upwind of the industrial smoke of the city. The conservation area comprises a number of streets developed from the 1860s to the 1930s with a wide variety of architectural styles ranging from Victoria and Edwardian villas, and Arts and Crafts houses built by local architects such as William de Lacy Aherne and Owen Parsons.

== Notable buildings and structures ==
=== Alcester Road ===
- 93, 1898 by Essex, Nicol & Goodman
- 98, Five Lands House, 1830s
- Dovecote
- Building to the North East of the Dovecote
- Moseley Hall, Birmingham, 1795-96
- 183 and 185, 1899 by William de Lacy Aherne
- 207 and 209, 1899 by William de Lacy Aherne

=== Amesbury Road ===
- 4, Kilmuir 1909 by Owen Parsons
- 6, The Hurst 1908 by William Bidlake
- 8, St Columb 1907 by William de Lacy Aherne
- 10, Woodview 1907 by William de Lacy Aherne
- 12, Walton House 1907 by William de Lacy Aherne
- 20, Wylands 1909 by Owen Parsons
- 28, The Grey House, 1908 by William de Lacy Aherne
- 30, 32, 1908 by William de Lacy Aherne
- 34, The Spinney 1908 by William de Lacy Aherne
- 36, 1910 by Owen Parsons
- 41, 1908 by William de Lacy Aherne

=== Chantry Road ===
- 25, 1896 by William de Lacy Aherne
- 37, 1897 by Essex, Nicol and Goodman

=== Goodby Road ===
- Ideal Society Benefit flats 1936 by Richard O Warder

=== Moor Green Lane ===
- 1. by G. Repton
- 2, The Firs 1886
- 5, Englefield 1898 by J.A. Grew
- 26, Heatherdene 1891
- 51, 1907
- Pitmaston, 1930-31 by Holland Hobbiss for the Ideal Benefit Society

=== Park Hill ===
- St Anne's Church, Moseley 1874 by Frederick Preedy
- 11, 1886 by Oliver Essex
- 13, 1886 by Oliver Essex
- 31, Ranelagh 1898
- 33, The Dell, 1889 by Newton and Cheatle
- 35, Clydesdale 1898 by Ernest Chawner Bewlay
- 37, The Red House 1899 by Ernest Chawner Bewlay
- 43, 1899 by Ernest Chawner Bewlay
- 45, 1899 by Ernest Chawner Bewlay
- 88, The Glen, 1898 by Newton and Cheatle
- 96, Glaisdale 1888 by Newton and Cheatle
- 98, Greengate 1887 by Newton and Cheatle
- 102, Arden Bank 1887 by Newton and Cheatle
- 106, Westfield 1886 by Newton and Cheatle
- 128, 1889 by Essex and Nichol

=== Reddings Road ===
Reddings Road was cut in 1903 and developed in two phases. The south side was largely completed by 1914 and the north side by 1924.

- 2, 4, 6, 8, 10, 12, 14, 16, 18, 20, 22, 24, 26, 28, 30, 1907 by William de Lacy Aherne
- 32, 34, 36, 38, 40, 42, 44, 46, 48, 50, 1908 by William de Lacy Aherne

=== Russell Road ===
- Overdale, 1901 by Owen Parsons
- 16, 18, 20, 22, 24, 26, 1906 by William de Lacy Aherne
- 34, Hazelhurst 1898 by Owen Parsons
- 55, 1915 by William de Lacy Aherne
- 60, Greystoke 1906 by Herbert Tudor Buckland end Edward Haywood-Farmer
- 179, 1915 by William de Lacy Aherne
- 187, 1914 by William de Lacy Aherne

=== Salisbury Road ===
Salisbury Road was cut in 1896.

- 16
- 19, 21, 1901 by Owen Parsons
- 48, 50, 1897 by Essex, Nicol & Goodman
- 52, Beverley 1896 by Essex, Nicol & Goodman
- 59, 1897 by Crouch and Butler
- 60, Mere End 1897 by William de Lacy Aherne
- 63, The Spinney 1897 by William de Lacy Aherne
- 70, 72, 74, 1903 by William de Lacy Aherne
- 76, Goodrest 1902 by William de Lacy Aherne
- 112, 1898 by William de Lacy Aherne

=== St Mary’s Row ===
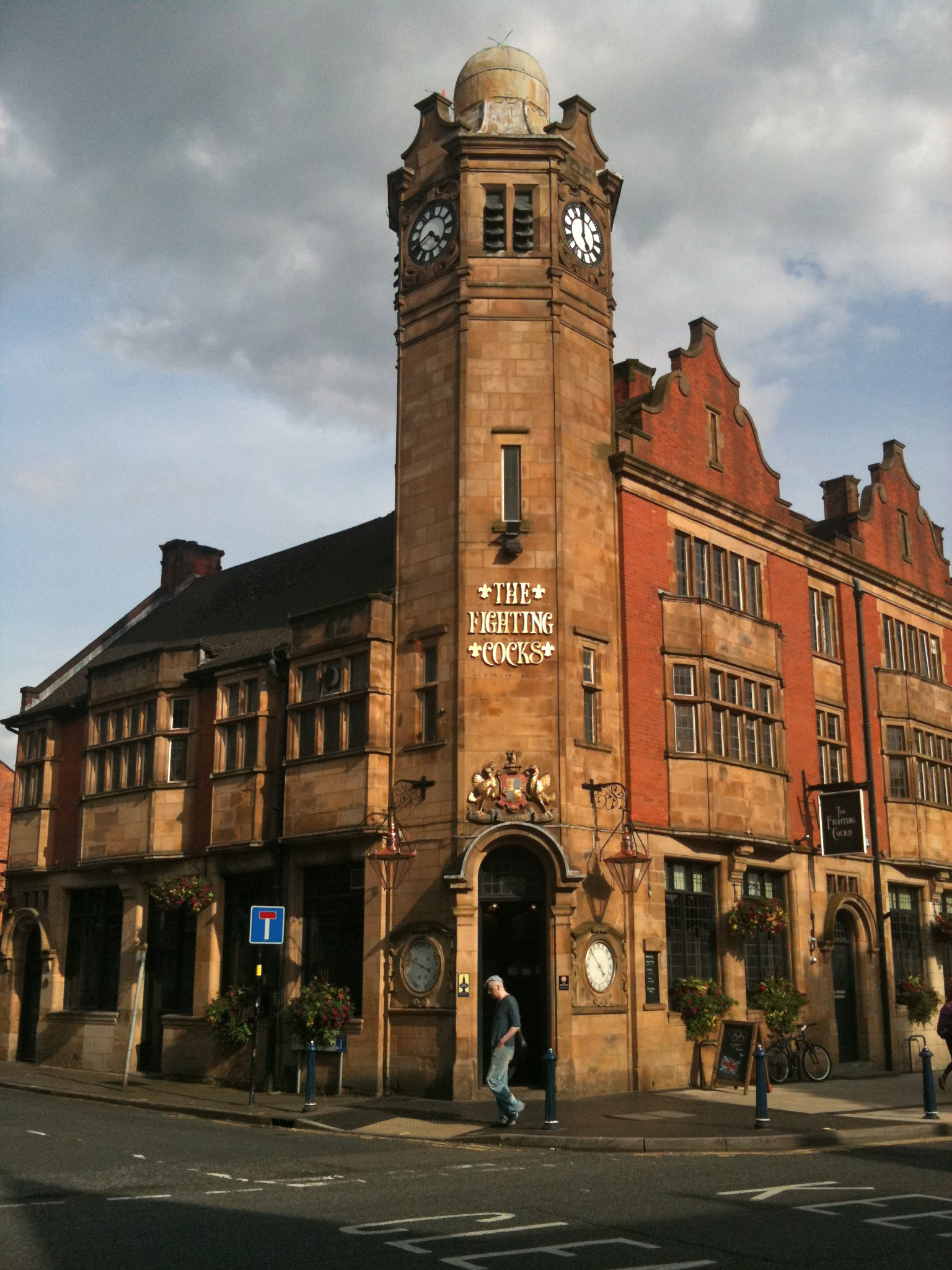
Fighting Cocks, 1903

- Fighting Cocks, Moseley 1903 by Thomas Walter Francis Newton and Alfred Edward Cheatle
- St Mary's Church, Moseley
- War memorial, 1920s

=== Strensham Road ===
- 17, Mornington 1885 by Newton and Cheatle (demolished)
- 19, Mardons Croft, 1885 by Newton and Cheatle (demolished)

== See also ==
- St Agnes Moseley Conservation Area another conservation area in Moseley.

== Bibliography ==
- Wood, Christine (2009), "William de Lacey Aherne", in Ballard, Phillada (ed.), Birmingham's Victorian and Edwardian Architects, Wetherby: Oblong Creative, ISBN 978-0955657627
