= List of conservation areas in the West Midlands (county) =

This is a list of conservation areas in the West Midlands, England. There are a total of 137 conservation areas throughout the West Midlands.

== Birmingham ==
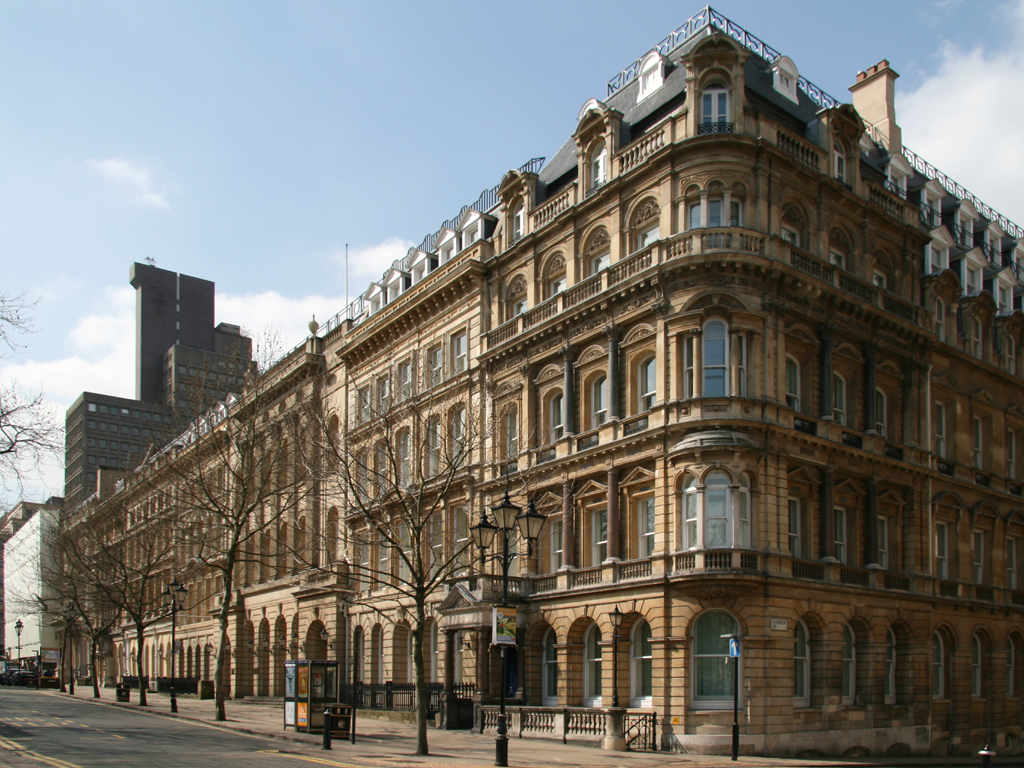
Colmore Row and Environs, City Centre conservation area.

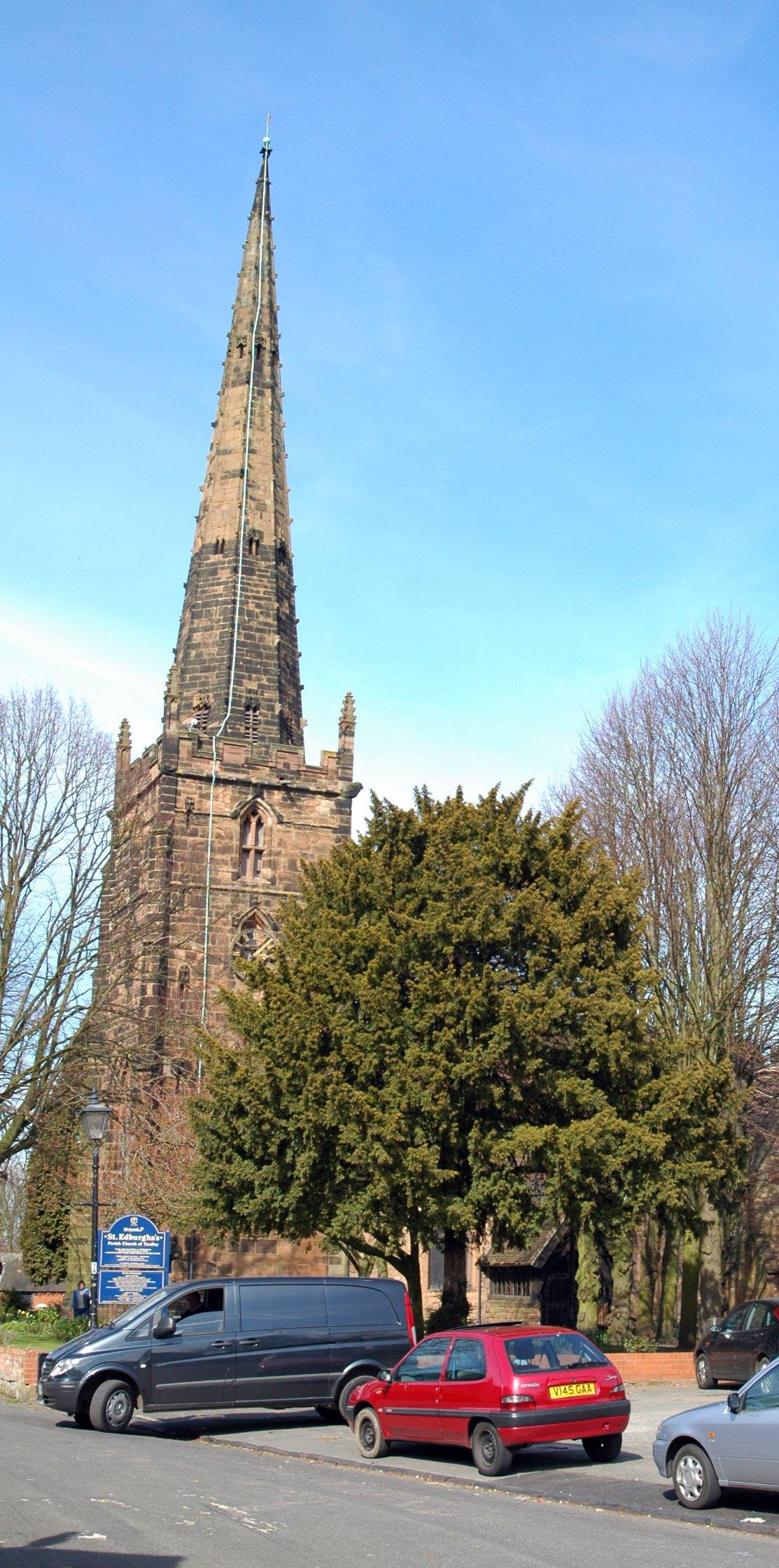
St Edburgha's Church (Old Yardley Church) within the Old Yardley conservation area.

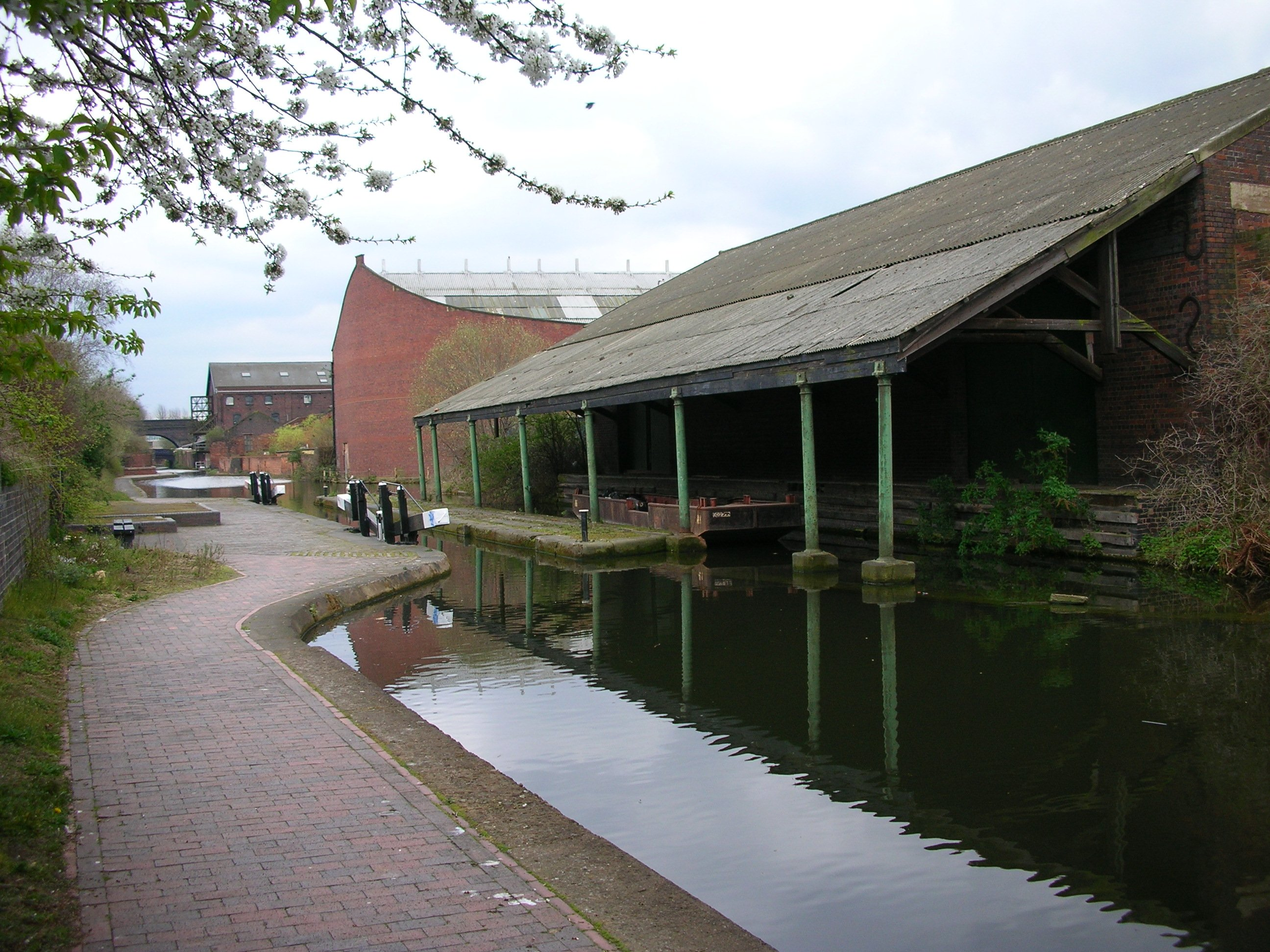
The Warwick Bar stop lock and Banana Warehouse in the Warwick Bar conservation area.

Birmingham has 27 conservation areas. The first conservation areas in Birmingham were designated in 1969. Birmingham City Council have designed 31 conservation areas, of which one, St Peter's Place, have been de-designated in 1976 following the demolition of the church in its centre. The Castle Bromwich Conservation Area was transferred to Solihull following a boundary amendment from 1 April 1988. The former Key Hill and St Paul's Conservation Areas were incorporated into the Jewellery Quarter Conservation Area on 27 September 2000.

Name	Area (ha)	Date designated	Additional designations or notes	References	Coordinates (links to map & photo sources)
Anchorage Road, Sutton Coldfield	17.57	15 October 1992	None.		52.569°N 1.824°W
Aston Hall and Church	24.98	27 January 1972	Extended 6 February 1975 and 17 November 1977.		52.506°N 1.884°W
Austin Village, Northfield/ Longbridge	13.26	17 July 1997	Covered by Article 4(2) Direction.		52.401°N 1.972°W
Barnsley Road, Edgbaston	12.07	19 May 1988	None.		52.474°N 1.963°W
Bournville Tenants	9.147	17 June 1971	Extended 6 February 1975.		52.417°N 1.947°W
Bournville Village	76.86	17 June 1971	Covered by Article 4(2) Direction. Extended 7 October 1971, 18 June 1981 and 14 July 1994.		52.431°N 1.934°W
Colmore Row and Environs, City Centre	21.70	7 October 1971	Extended 21 March 1985 and 5 July 1985.		52.481°N 1.900°W
Digbeth, Deritend, and Bordesley High Streets	28.68	31 May 2000	None.		52.476°N 1.884°W
Edgbaston	395.4	4 September 1975	Extended 13 December 1984, 17 September 1992 and 10 October 1992.		52.461°N 1.919°W
Four Oaks, Sutton Coldfield	114	10 July 1986	None.		52.576°N 1.832°W
Harborne Old Village	24.79	17 July 1969	None.		52.453°N 1.957°W
High Street, Sutton Coldfield	16.95	28 November 1973	Partly covered by Article 4(1) Direction. Extended 6 February 1975, 14 August 1980 and 16 July 1992.		52.566°N 1.823°W
Ideal Village, Bordesley Green	17.57	18 October 1990	Covered by Article 4(2) Direction.		52.478°N 1.836°W
Jewellery Quarter	94.43	10 January 1980	Extended 18 January 1996 and 27 September 2000.		52.488°N 1.911°W
Kings Norton	14.28	17 July 1969	None.		52.408°N 1.930°W
Lee Crescent, Edgbaston	2.342	6 June 1974	None.		52.469°N 1.908°W
Lozells and Soho Hill	34.44	19 July 1979	None.		52.501°N 1.919°W
Moor Pool, Harborne	22.32	30 July 1970	Covered by Article 4(2) Direction. Character Appraisal and Management Plan adopted in March 2012.		52.463°N 1.957°W
Moseley	95.06	17 March 1983	Extended 12 November 1987 and 14 March 2005.		52.449°N 1.893°W
Northfield Old Village	4.076	17 July 1969	None.		52.411°N 1.964°W
Old Yardley	11.47	17 July 1969	Covered by Article 4(1) Direction). Extended 15 August 1974.		52.474°N 1.803°W
Ryland Road, Edgbaston	2.759	13 March 1969	None.		52.468°N 1.909°W
St Agnes, Moseley	27.59	25 June 1987	None.		52.442°N 1.877°W
St Augustines, Edgbaston	13.46	18 February 1988	None.		52.473°N 1.944°W
School Road, Hall Green	6.380	17 November 1988	First designation of speculative semi-detached suburbia.		52.433°N 1.837°W
Steelhouse, City Centre	11.07	4 October 1993	None.		52.484°N 1.893°W
Warwick Bar, Digbeth	16.19	25 June 1987	None.		52.479°N 1.884°W

== Coventry ==
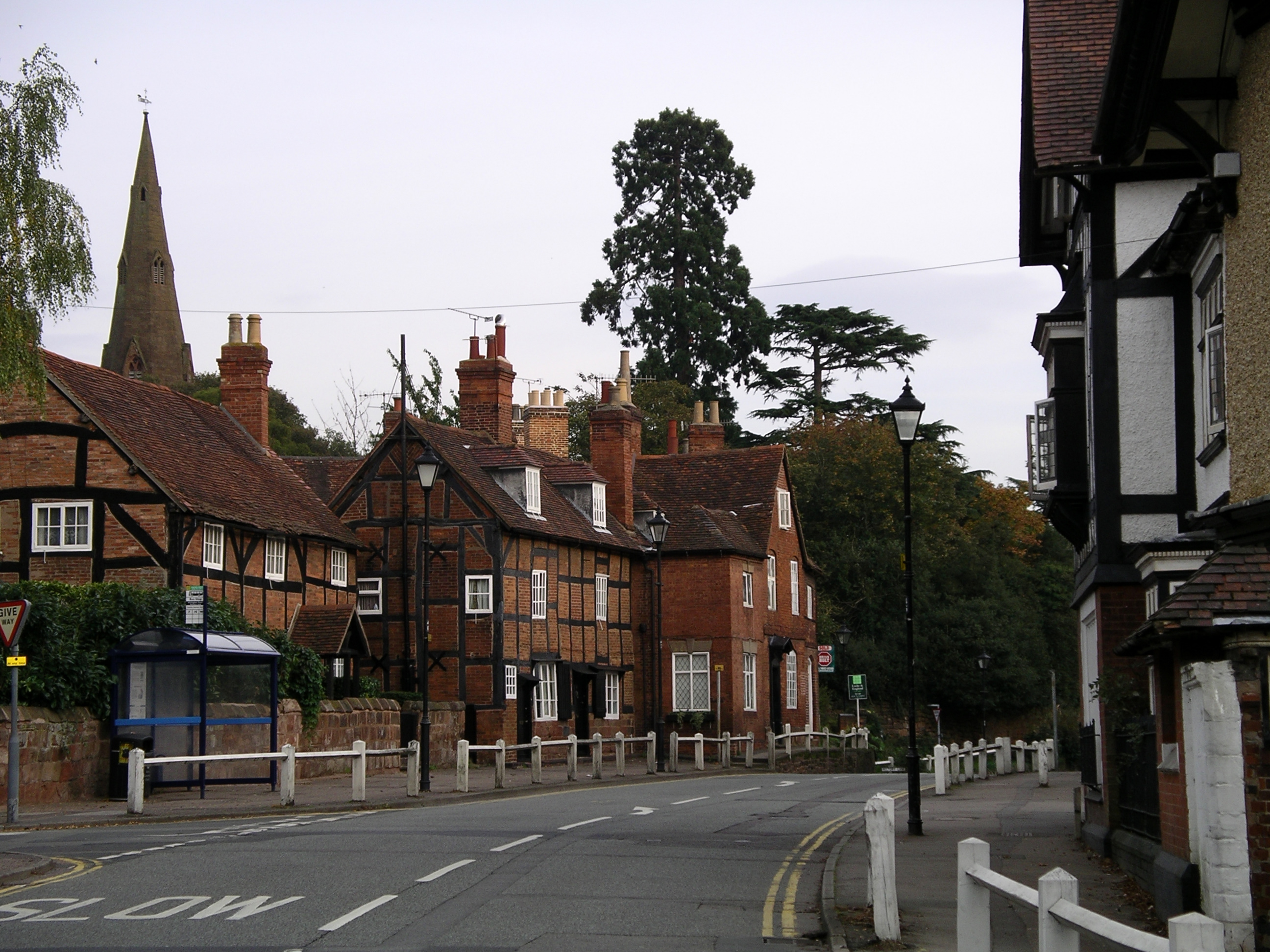
Birmingham Road in the Allesley Village conservation area.

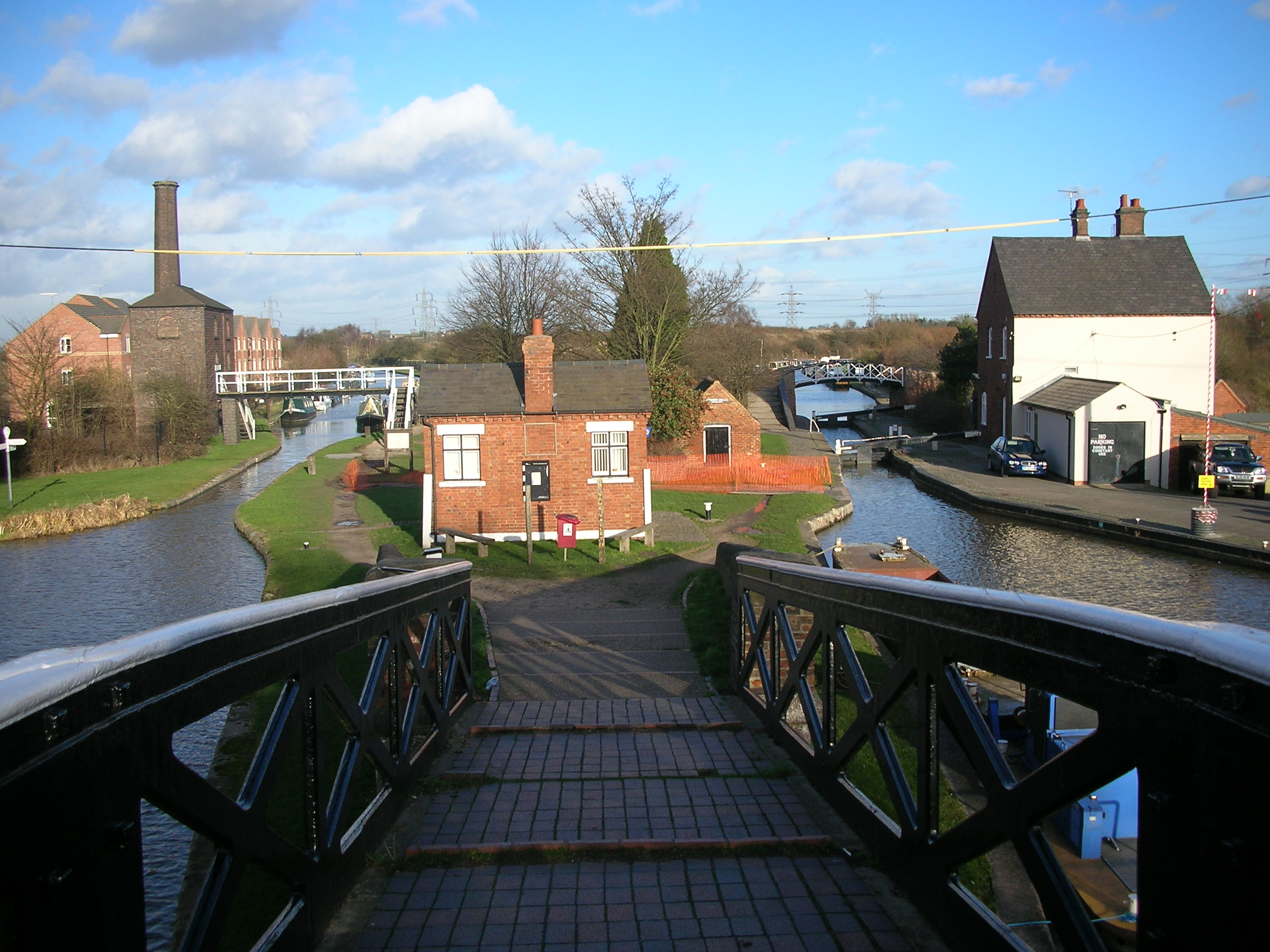
Engine house and Coventry Canal (left), Oxford Canal (right) at the Hawkesbury Junction conservation area.

Coventry has 18 conservation areas. The first conservation areas were designated in 1968.

Name	Date designated	Additional designations or notes	Coordinates (links to map & photo sources)
Allesley Village	20 December 1968	Extended 29 November 1994.	52.423°N 1.558°W
Kenilworth Road, Earlsdon	20 December 1968	Extensions agreed 6 September 1978 with effect from 10 October 1978. Minor boundary adjustments approved 6 January 2004. Contiguous with Earlsdon Conservation Area.	52.384°N 1.536°W
Stoke Green	20 December 1968	Extension and other minor boundary adjustments approved 6 January 2004.	52.406°N 1.481°W
Greyfriars Green, City Centre	8 August 1969	Extended 6 April 1977.	52.404°N 1.513°W
Hill Top, City Centre	8 August 1969	"Outstanding" status given 14 December 1976 (since discontinued). Minor boundary adjustment approved 6 January 2004.	52.408°N 1.507°W
Lady Herbert's Garden, City Centre	8 August 1969	Extended 6 April 1977. Minor boundary adjustment approved 6 January 2004.	52.411°N 1.508°W
Spon Street, City Centre	8 August 1969	Extension to north and other minor boundary adjustments approved 6 January 2004.	52.408°N 1.517°W
Hawkesbury Junction	14 September 1976	Designated jointly with Nuneaton & Bedworth Borough Council and ratified by the West Midlands County Council in October 1976.	52.457°N 1.469°W
Chapelfields	9 November 1976	None.	52.407°N 1.533°W
London Road, north of Whitley	5 April 1977	Given "outstanding" status 7 October 1977 (since discontinued). The Cemetery is now on the English Heritage Parks & Gardens register.	52.399°N 1.496°W
High Street, City Centre	12 October 1982	Contiguous with Hill Top Conservation Area	52.407°N 1.509°W
Ivy Farm Lane, Canley	16 November 1989	Minor boundary adjustments approved 6 January 2004.	52.387°N 1.547°W
Far Gosford Street, adjacent to the A460	21 October 1992	None.	52.407°N 1.494°W
Naul's Mill	10 September 2003	None.	52.413°N 1.515°W
Spon End	10 September 2003	None.	52.411°N 1.522°W
Coventry Canal	19 June 2012	None.	52.417°N 1.511°W
Earlsdon	21 November 2022	Contiguous with Kenilworth Road Conservation Area	52.399°N 1.532°W
Brownshill Green	21 November 2022	None.	52.441°N 1.551°W

== Dudley ==
There are 21 conservation areas in Dudley.

Name	Additional designations or notes	Coordinates (links to map & photo sources)
All Saints, Sedgley	None.	52.540°N 2.123°W
Bumble Hole, Netherton	None.	52.492°N 2.072°W
Castle Hill, Dudley	None.	52.515°N 2.079°W
Church Road, Oldswinford	None.	52.447°N 2.136°W
The Coppice, Coseley	None.	52.541°N 2.103°W
Delph 'Nine' Locks, Brierley Hill	None.	52.477°N 2.120°W
Dudley Town Centre	None.	52.509°N 2.084°W
High Street, Stourbridge	None.	52.457°N 2.146°W
The Leasowes, Halesowen	Article Four.	52.469°N 2.065°W
Love Lane, Oldswinford	Article Four.	52.448°N 2.146°W
Lutley Mill, Lutley	None.	52.450°N 2.077°W
Mushroom Green	Article Four.	52.476°N 2.093°W
Oak Street, Coseley	None.	52.536°N 2.090°W
Parkhead Locks, Dudley	None.	52.498°N 2.099°W
Stourbridge Branch Canal (Amblecote)	None.	52.467°N 2.155°W
Stourbridge Canal (Canal Street)	None.	52.461°N 2.152°W
Stourbridge 16 Locks, Wordsley	None.	52.478°N 2.151°W
The Village, Kingswinford	Partly covered by Article Four.	52.501°N 2.157°W
Wollaston	None.	52.460°N 2.163°W
Wordsley Church	None.	52.479°N 2.160°W
Wordsley Hospital	None.	52.485°N 2.160°W

== Sandwell ==
There are six conservation areas in Sandwell.

Name	Area (ha)	Date designated	Additional designations or notes	Coordinates (links to map & photo sources)
Church Square, Oldbury	1.34	1974	None.	52.503°N 2.014°W
Market Place, Wednesbury	3.11	1980	None.	52.552°N 2.018°W
Smethwick Summit (Galton Valley)	47.48	1985	None.	52.497°N 1.972°W
Factory Locks, Tipton	2.62	1986	None.	52.531°N 2.071°W
High Street, West Bromwich	11.80	1990	Extended 1995 and 1997.	52.520°N 1.997°W
Warrens Hall	33.98	1994	None.	52.494°N 2.065°W

== Solihull ==
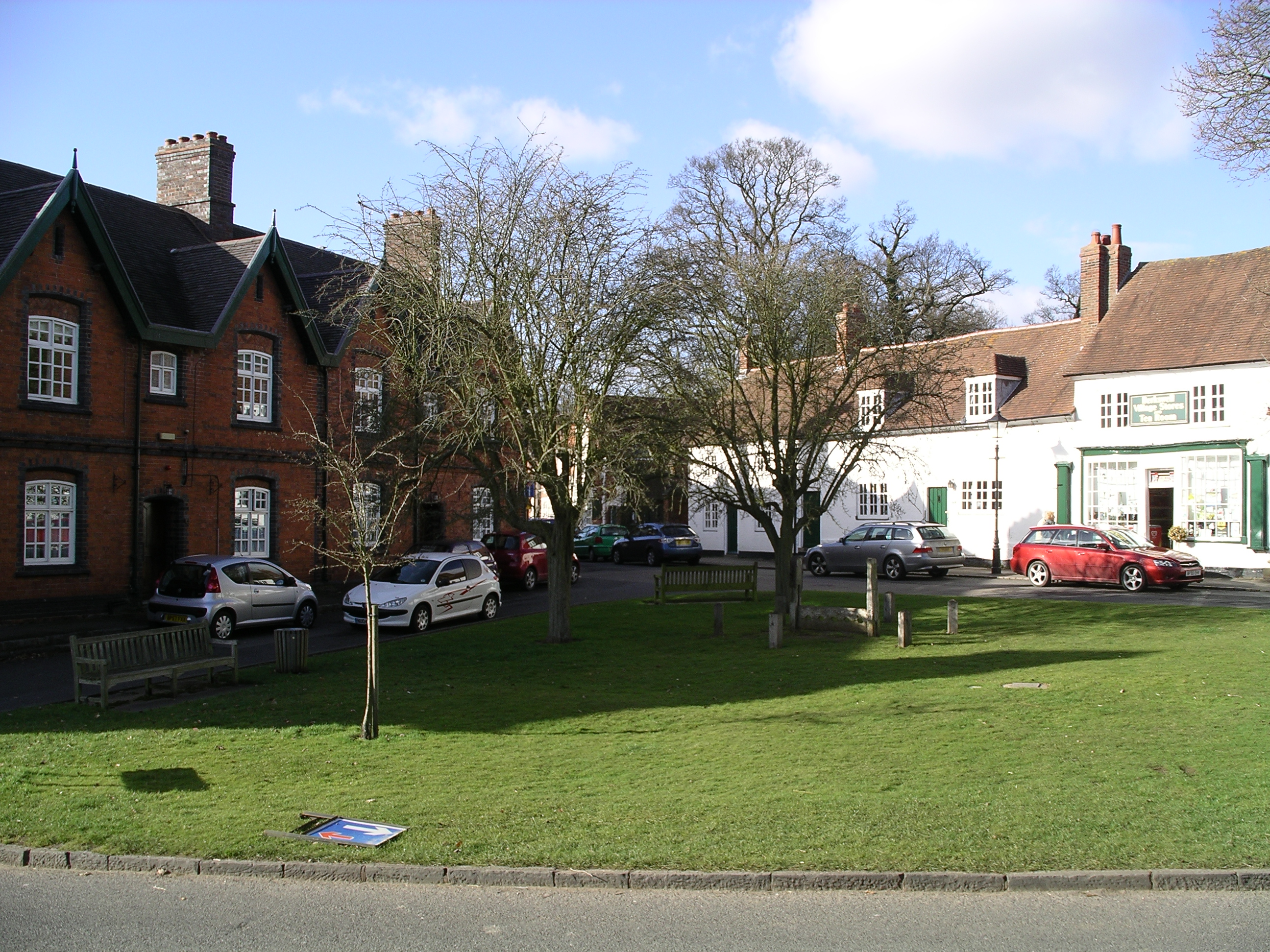
Berkswell village green.

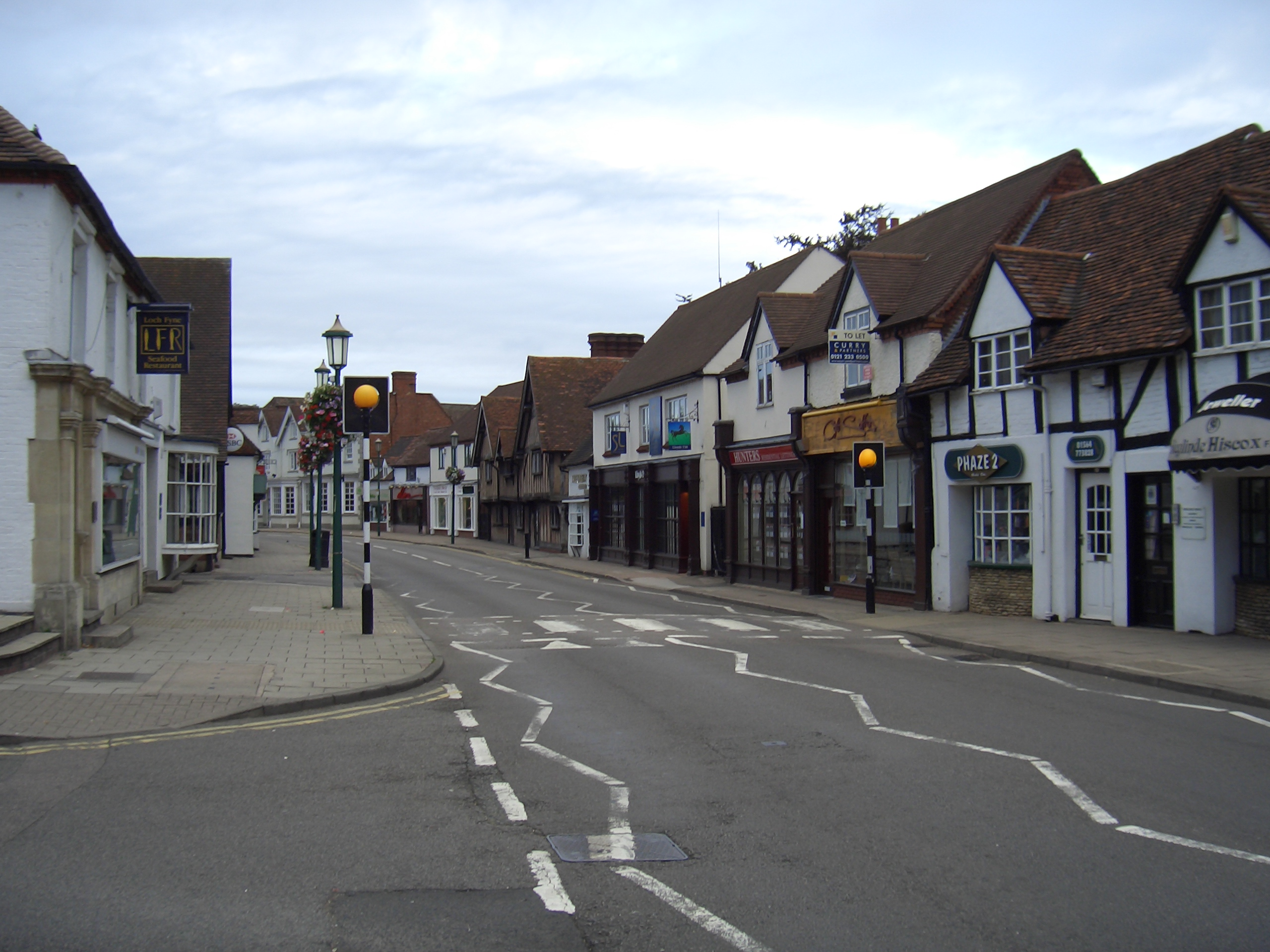
Knowle High Street.

There are 20 conservation areas in Solihull.

Name	Coordinates (links to map & photo sources)
Ashleigh Road	52.417°N 1.787°W
Barston	52.400°N 1.696°W
Berkswell	52.409°N 1.641°W
Bickenhill	52.437°N 1.724°W
Castle Bromwich	52.507°N 1.788°W
Granville Road, Dorridge	52.370°N 1.747°W
Grove Avenue	Unknown
Hampton-in-Arden	52.427°N 1.701°W
Knowle	52.388°N 1.734°W
Malvern Hall and Brueton Avenue	52.412°N 1.769°W
Malvern Park Farm	52.399°N 1.771°W
Meriden Green	52.437°N 1.649°W
Meriden Hill	52.436°N 1.652°W
Olton	52.428°N 1.811°W
Solihull	52.412°N 1.776°W
Station Approach, Dorridge	52.372°N 1.753°W
Temple Balsall	52.381°N 1.699°W
Walsal End	52.412°N 1.704°W
Warwick Road	52.417°N 1.781°W
Whitehouse Green	52.411°N 1.795°W

== Walsall ==
There are 18 conservation areas in Walsall. The first were designated in 1977.

Name	Area (ha)	Date designated	Coordinates (links to map & photo sources)
Aldridge	38	25 March 1980	52.605°N 1.913°W
Walsall Arboretum	31.32	19 April 1989	52.590°N 1.972°W
Bloxwich High Street	Unknown.	18 October 2002	52.617°N 2.004°W
Bloxwich Park	9.41	13 December 1989	52.619°N 2.005°W
Bradford Street	6.05	17 April 1991	52.580°N 1.985°W
Bridge Street	5.5	13 July 1983	52.584°N 1.981°W
Caldmore Green	1.5	18 March 1987	52.583°N 1.981°W
Church Hill	20.5	9 March 1979	52.581°N 1.977°W
Darlaston	6.5	7 February 1977	52.568°N 2.033°W
Elmore Green, Bloxwich	7.73	19 April 1990	52.614°N 2.004°W
Great Barr	764	12 January 1996	52.569°N 1.917°W
Highgate	10.2	12 October 1994	52.576°N 1.975°W
Lichfield Street	6.9	6 July 1988	52.586°N 1.978°W
Old Pelsall	3.9	20 August 1986	52.626°N 1.978°W
Old Rushall	7.07	26 October 1983	52.597°N 1.964°W
Pelsall Common	57.5	2 March 1979	52.626°N 1.967°W
Walsall Locks	5.5	18 March 1987	52.588°N 1.993°W
Willenhall	7.7	28 January 1977	52.584°N 2.055°W

== Wolverhampton ==
There are 30 conservation areas in Wolverhampton, more than any other metropolitan borough in the West Midlands. The first conservation area was designated in 1972.

Name	Date designated	Additional designations or notes	Coordinates (links to map & photo sources)
Ash Hill	13 October 1994	None.	52.585°N 2.165°W
Bantock House	12 October 1989	None.	52.579°N 2.154°W
Bilston Town Centre	1975	Boundaries were adjusted 30 September 2002.	52.566°N 2.074°W
Bushbury Hill	1972	Boundaries were adjusted 25 June 1974.	52.625°N 2.105°W
Castlecroft Gardens	28 July 1988	None.	52.577°N 2.176°W
Cedar Way	22 April 1999	None.	52.607°N 2.088°W
Chapel Ash	11 April 1991	None.	52.584°N 2.137°W
Cleveland Road, City Centre	13 June 1996	None.	52.581°N 2.120°W
Copthorne Road	2001	Boundaries were adjusted 4 March 2002.	52.571°N 2.141°W
Fellows Street, Blakenhall	26 November 2001	None.	52.575°N 2.130°W
Old Hall Street, City Centre	26 October 1995	None.	52.583°N 2.124°W
Park	1975	Boundaries were adjusted 12 October 1995.	52.590°N 2.140°W
Penn Fields	14 April 1994	None.	52.567°N 2.147°W
Penn Road, Graiseley	24 July 1997	None.	52.573°N 2.138°W
Springfield Brewery	3 October 2003	None.	52.592°N 2.121°W
St John's Square	1972	Boundaries were adjusted in 1986 and on 12 October 1989.	52.581°N 2.128°W
St Philips, Penn Fields	10 October 1991	None.	52.566°N 2.159°W
Staffordshire and Worcestershire & Shropshire Union Canal	14 October 1993	None.	52.615°N 2.146°W
Tettenhall Greens	1972	Boundaries were adjusted 14 July 2003.	52.600°N 2.172°W
Tettenhall Road	1 December 2004	None.	52.592°N 2.153°W
Tettenhall Wood	6 November 1975	None.	52.594°N 2.188°W
The Oaks, Merridale	1 December 2004	None.	52.584°N 2.143°W
The Woodlands	17 June 1976	None.	52.562°N 2.155°W
Union Mill	1985	Boundaries were adjusted 14 March 2007.	52.588°N 2.117°W
Vicarage Road, Penn	1972	Boundaries were adjusted 17 June 1976.	52.556°N 2.160°W
Wednesfield	1988	Boundaries were adjusted 13 January 1994.	52.599°N 2.083°W
Wightwick Bank	12 October 1989	None.	52.582°N 2.193°W
Wolverhampton Locks	1975	Boundaries were adjusted 14 March 2007.	52.606°N 2.141°W
Wolverhampton City Centre	1972	Boundaries were adjusted in 1974, 1975, 1976, 1991, 2005 and on 14 March 2007.	52.587°N 2.128°W
Worcester Street, City Centre	26 October 1995	None.	52.582°N 2.130°W

== See also ==
- Article Four Direction
- Conservation in the United Kingdom
