= St Agnes Moseley Conservation Area =

Coordinates: 52°26′27″N 1°52′39″W

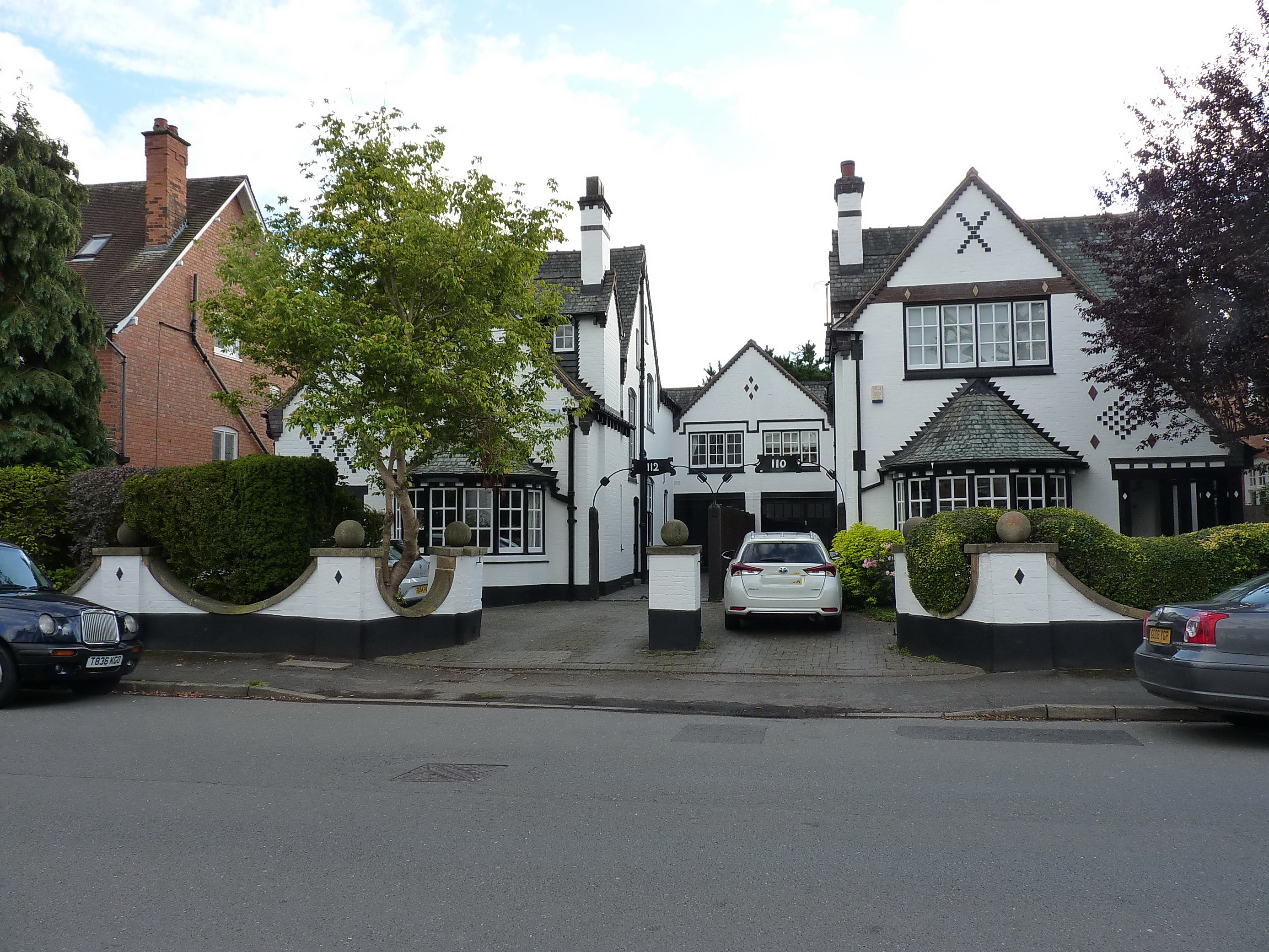
110 and 112 Oxford Road by William de Lacy Aherne 1907

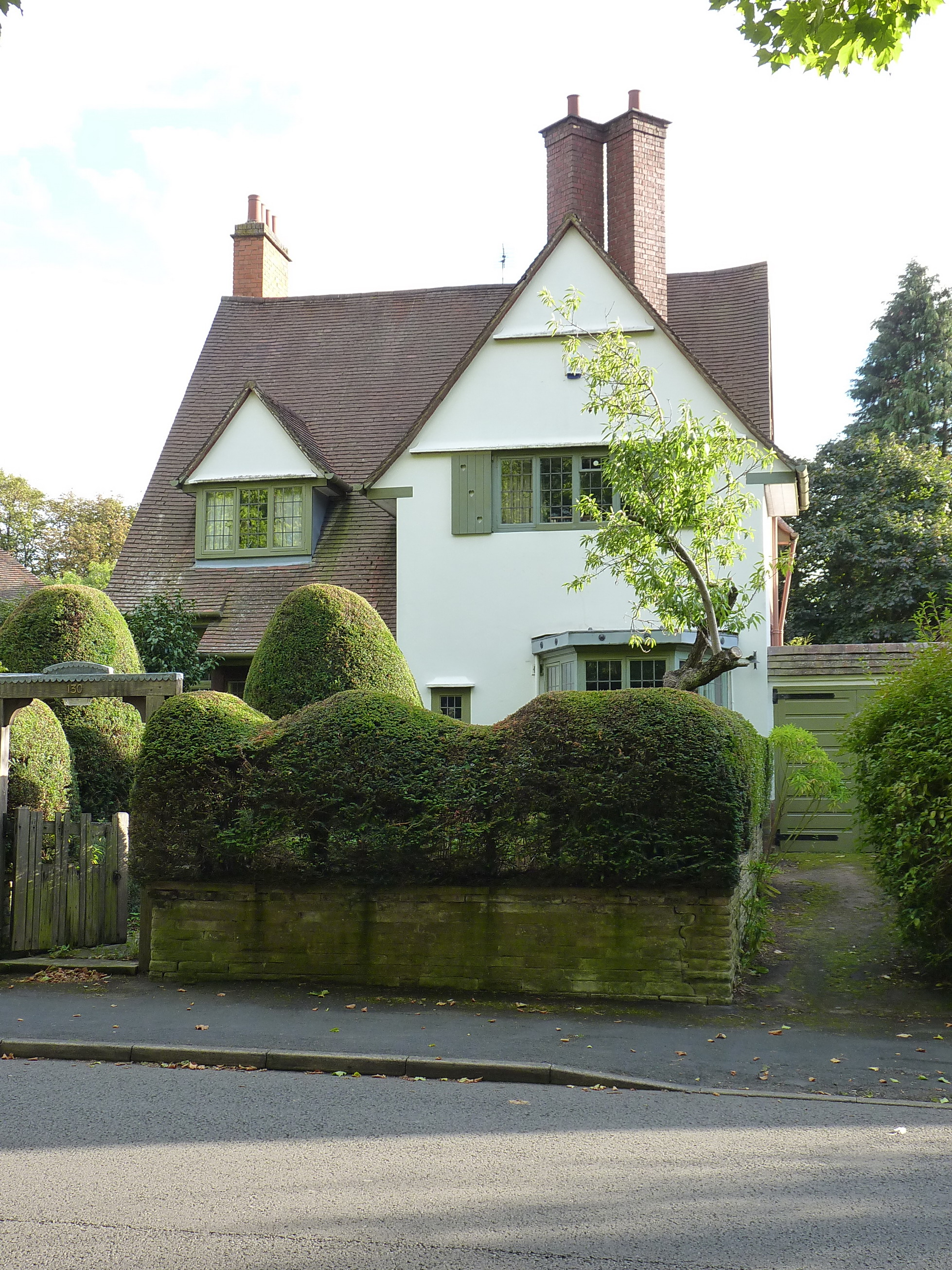
Maxstoke, 130 Oxford Road by Owen Parsons 1907

The St Agnes Moseley Conservation Area is in Moseley, Birmingham.

== Description ==
The conservation area was designated on 25 June 1987 and extended on 31 July 2009. It comprises an area of 27.59 hectares (68.2 acres). It is centred on Oxford Road and St Agnes' Church, Moseley.

The opening of Moseley railway station in 1867 started a property boom in Moseley, which was accelerated by the arrival of steam driven tramway services to Birmingham along the Alcester Road provided by the Birmingham Central Tramways Company Ltd which started operating on 29 December 1884. Moseley was an attractive location for the prosperous middle-classes, as it was situated south of Birmingham upwind of the industrial smoke of the city. The conservation area comprises a number of streets developed from the 1860s to the 1930s with a wide variety of architectural styles ranging from Victoria and Edwardian villas, and Arts and Crafts houses built by local architects such as William de Lacy Aherne and J. Brewin Holmes.

== Notable buildings and structures ==
=== Billesley Lane ===
- Pairs of houses 1923-26 by George Payton
- 51-57, by Daniell & Berrill 1905
- 71-81, by George Payton 1923-26

=== Colmore Crescent ===
The crescent was named after the Vicar of Moseley, Canon William Colmore.

- St Agnes' Church, Moseley 1884 by William Davis
- 1, Tudor Lodge by Owen Parsons 1916
- Vicarage to St Agnes’ Church, by Charles Edward Bateman 1922-23

=== Cotton Lane ===
- 59, Fernlea by William de Lacy Aherne 1902
- 61, Clavendon by William de Lacy Aherne 1902
- 63, Rathen by William de Lacy Aherne 1902
- 65, Tresco by William de Lacy Aherne 1902
- 67, by William de Lacy Aherne 1899
- 71, 73, 75, 77 by William de Lacy Aherne 1898
- 76-86 by George Pepper

=== Dyott Road ===
- 30, 1910 for George Lanchester
- 39, by William de Lacy Aherne 1902
- 41, by William de Lacy Aherne 1900

=== Grove Avenue ===
- 17, Meldon by William de Lacy Aherne 1897

=== Oxford Road ===
- 90, 92, 94, 96, 98, 100, 102, 104, 106, 108 by William de Lacy Aherne 1905
- 105, 107 by William de Lacy Aherne 1904
- 110 and 112 by William de Lacy Aherne 1907
- 113, 115, 117, 119 by William de Lacy Aherne 1907
- 130, Maxstoke by Owen Parsons 1907

=== St Agnes Road ===
- 5, Hilver
- 8, Harris House
- 9, Whitecroft by William de Lacy Aherne 1906 for W.B. Incledon
- 10, Hazelmere
- 12 Mapledene House, by Marcus Type 1915
- 13, Eastcote by William de Lacy Aherne 1900
- 15, by Anthony Rowse 1904
- 25 The Moorings and 27 The Homestead by William Alexander Harvey 1905
- 37, Redlands ca. 1900
- 44, Llanherne by George Pepper
- 62, 64, 66, 68 by William de Lacy Aherne 1907

=== Wake Green Road ===
- Eleven houses, 1907-11 by William de Lacy Aherne
- 40, Kingsthorpe by Owen Parsons 1910 for F.S. Banks, jeweller.
- 42, 44, 46 by William de Lacy Aherne 1911
- 48, by George Pepper
- 50, Broxtowe by George Pepper 1907 for A.N.Gosling, butcher
- 56, 58, 60, 62, 64 by William de Lacy Aherne 1904

== Bibliography ==
- Wood, Christine (2009), "William de Lacey Aherne", in Ballard, Phillada (ed.), Birmingham's Victorian and Edwardian Architects, Wetherby: Oblong Creative, ISBN 978-0955657627
