= Frank Stephens (cricketer) =

English cricketer

Personal information
- Full name: Frank Garfield Stephens
- Born: 26 April 1889; Edgbaston, Birmingham, Warwickshire, England
- Died: 9 August 1970 (aged 81); Moseley, Warwickshire
- Batting: Right-handed
- Bowling: Right-arm leg-spin
- Relatives: George Stephens (brother)

Domestic team information
- Years: Team
- 1907–1912: Warwickshire

Career statistics
Competition	First-class
Matches	32
Runs scored	1102
Batting average	25.62
100s/50s	1/7
Top score	144 not out
Balls bowled	314
Wickets	3
Bowling average	68.33
5 wickets in innings	0
10 wickets in match	0
Best bowling	2/24
Catches/stumpings	17/–
- Source: Cricinfo, 9 March 2015

Frank Garfield Stephens (26 April 1889 – 9 August 1970) was an English amateur cricketer who played first-class cricket for Warwickshire from 1907 to 1912.

On his first-class debut, against Yorkshire in 1907, Stephens top-scored in the second innings with 15 not out as Warwickshire were dismissed for 47. He made his highest score, 144 not out, against Lancashire in 1912, preventing defeat after Warwickshire had trailed by 282 runs on the first innings.

His twin brother, George, captained Warwickshire in 1919. Both brothers played in Warwickshire's first County Championship victory in 1911 and later served on the Warwickshire committee.
