= Leslie Croom =

English cricketer

Personal information
- Full name: Leslie Charles Brian Croom
- Born: 20 April 1920; Wybunbury, Cheshire, England
- Died: 20 December 1989 (aged 69); Dudley, Worcestershire, England
- Batting: Right-handed
- Bowling: Right-arm off break
- Relatives: Alfred Croom (Father)

Domestic team information
- Years: Team
- 1949: Warwickshire

Career statistics
Competition	First-class
Matches	4
Runs scored	73
Batting average	9.12
100s/50s	–/–
Top score	26
Catches/stumpings	–/–
- Source: Cricinfo, 9 May 2012

Leslie Charles Brian Croom (20 April 1920 – 20 December 1989) was an English cricketer. Croom was a right-handed batsman who bowled right-arm off break. He was born at Wybunbury, near Nantwich, Cheshire.

Croom made his first-class debut for Warwickshire against Cambridge University at Fenner's in 1949. He made three further first-class appearances in that season for the county, the last of which came against Lancashire at Edgbaston. In his four first-class appearances, he scored a total of 73 runs at an average of 9.12, with a high score of 26.

He died at Dudley, Worcestershire, on 20 December 1989. His Father, Alfred Croom, was also a first-class cricketer.
