= St Mary's Church, Moseley =

St. Mary's Church, Moseley
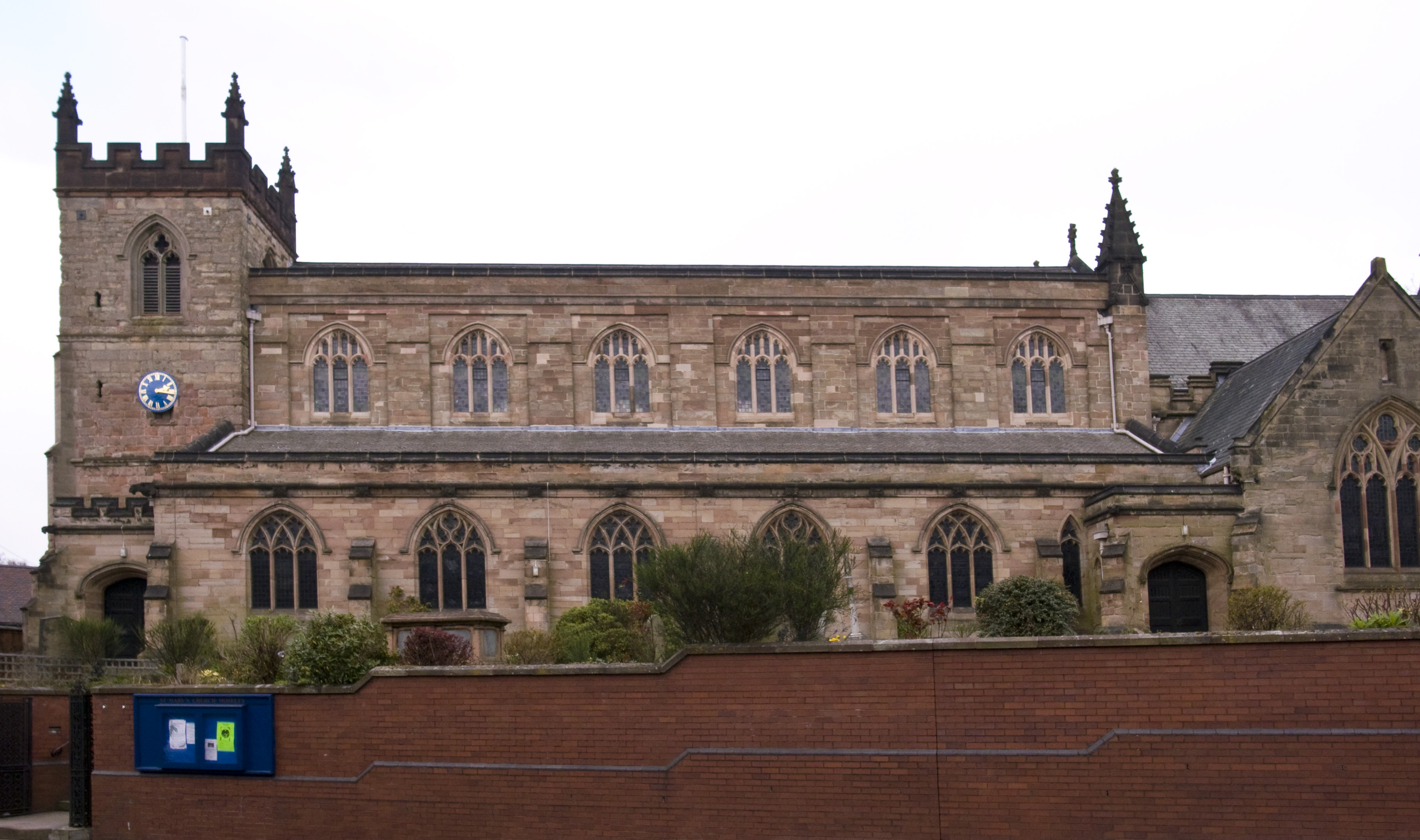
- St. Mary's Church, Moseley
- 52.4464°N 1.8866°W
- Denomination: Church of England
- Churchmanship: Broad Church
- Website: Benefice website

History
- Dedication: St. Mary

Administration
- Province: Province of Canterbury
- Diocese: Diocese of Birmingham
- Parish: Moseley

Clergy
- Vicar(s): Revd Angela Hannafin (Vicar) and Revd Magdalen Smith (Associate Vicar)

St Mary's Church, Moseley is a Grade II listed parish church in the Church of England located in Moseley, Birmingham. It is now part of a united benefice with St Anne's Church, Moseley. The War Memorial in the South-East corner of the Churchyard, facing Oxford Road, is unusual in that it depicts Christ upon the cross in carved stone. The War Memorial has achieved its own Grade II listing.

== History ==
A religious building dedicated to St Mary has been at the heart of Moseley for over 600 years. The foundation of the church for public worship is taken to be the Papal Mandate from Pope Innocent VII dated 2 February 1405 by which he instructed the Bishop of Worcester to allow the local parishioners to have mass and other divine offices celebrated by fit priests in the chapel of St Mary Moseley. At that time, the Parish Church was at Bromsgrove and that church was said to be so distant that access at certain times of the year was impossible, without danger, especially for old men and pregnant women and other weak persons, on account of the distance and floods.

Earlier references to Elizabeth of York, the wife of King Henry VII, giving land in October 1494, upon which to build a church, are now found to be mistaken. She did not become the Lord of Manor until May 1495 on the death of her grandmother Cecily Neville, Duchess of York, who had been given the Manor for life by her son, Edward IV. The land given by Cicely to the trustees of the existing chapel of the Blessed Mary, in return for a red rose every midsummer's day, was not for any particular purpose and was entirely covered with water which would not have been a good place to build anything! Perhaps this was the origin of Ladypool.

In the 5th year of the reign of King Henry VIII (1513–1514), a tower was built using 48 cart loads of stone from the walls of the parsonage at Bromsgrove. In addition, repairs were done to the chapel and bells were bought.

The Commissioners of King Edward VI confirmed the continuation of a priest in the chapel in 1548 at the time that Chantries were being abolished at a salary of £4 13s 4d (7 marks) a year which was still being paid well into the 19th century.

Dissenters ministered in the Chapel in the 17th century but were ejected in 1662 after the restoration of King Charles II.

Throughout this time, Moseley was regarded as a Perpetual Curacy, with trustees looking after it, and a Chapel of Ease first to Bromsgrove and then to King's Norton churches. As a result of augmentations to the living from Queen Anne's Bounty during the 18th century, Moseley became an ecclesiastical parish ('body politick') in its own right, but without a defined boundary, in 1755.

By 1780 the Chapelry of Moseley was described as a very ancient structure the middle aisle of which was falling down and all other parts except the Tower were so ruinous that it could no longer be supported and "not being large enough to contain the inhabitants that resort thereto must be taken down rebuilt and enlarged before divine service can be performed therein with Safety to the Minister and Congregation". A public subscription was sanctioned by Letters Patent of George III to secure the architect's estimated cost of rebuilding of £1028.5s.10½d., excluding old materials.. The chapel was widened and the height was raised by about 8 feet.

In 1823, with the benefit of a grant of £250 from the Incorporated Society for the Enlargement of Churches and Chapels towards the total cost in the region of £2000 raised by another public subscription, Thomas Rickman (1776–1841) was chosen as the architect to improve the building with his ideas of Gothic Revival but it was all sham. The walls were brick, plastered inside and out in imitation of stone; the flat ceiling was crossed by parallel and diagonal imitation oak beams in plaster and the window mullions were cast iron. Even the font was a plaster bowl fixed against the west wall, modelled on a medieval piscina. Everything had to give way to accommodation for an additional 362 seats of which 247 were free. This church was about the length of the Nave of the present church. There was no Chancel, but rather an apse for the altar at the East End. Against the tower at the West, there was a loft, accessed from the belfry, which housed a small barrel organ and choir.

This instrument produced a very small selection of hymn tunes (probably only 6) and a short-lived music group was introduced to enhance the music but it was found to be too expensive to maintain. Miss Sarah Taylor of Moseley Hall then provided the church with a new, much improved barrel organ in 1838, the loft having been converted into a larger gallery with seating for about 150. In 1856, a manual organ by Bosward & Sons of Birmingham was installed in the gallery and the barrel organ found its way to Yardley Wood Parish Church.

Shortly prior to this, in 1853, Moseley Chapel dedicated to St Mary was granted a fully defined boundary and became a District Chapelry with the Incumbent, still a Perpetual Curate, able to celebrate Holy Matrimony and receive the statutory fees. This was the result of a series of Acts in the early years of Queen Victoria's reign to "make better provision for the assignment of ecclesiastical districts to churches or chapels augmented by the Governors of the Bounty of Queen Anne". In 1866, the District Chapelry was transformed into a vicarage and for the first time the incumbent became a vicar. A parsonage house had been built in 1856 on glebe land in School Road. The detailed specifications for the building included servants' quarters, a system of calling bells, a piggery and a chicken coop but not a bathroom.

No sooner had the Parish of St Mary, Moseley secured settled boundaries than a large portion to the south was created in 1863 into the separate Consolidated Chapelry of All Saints, Kings Heath which itself became a vicarage in 1866. The same occurred for the District Chapelry of St Anne's Church, Moseley in 1875 with land to the north.

Nevertheless, the population of Moseley increased considerably over this time from a small village of 1500 people to an urban suburb of nearly 17,000, according to the Census records from 1851 to 1911. More space and additional worship buildings were required.

In 1872, the church was extended eastwards by 21 feet to provide the first chancel. At the same time, the Bosward organ was enlarged and moved from the gallery to a purpose-built chamber to the north of the new Chancel.A further 50 additional sittings were provided.

This was the work of the Architect, J. A. Chatwin and began his association of over thirty years with the alterations to the church.

Before any further building took place, the church acquired a new set of bells. St Mary's Church, Moseley originally possessed three bells, as is recorded in an inventory of 1552. They were later recast and were purchased by Miss Rebecca Anderton for the new St Anne's church in 1874. In the same year, the tower at St Mary's was provided with a ring of eight steel bells from Sheffield which had hung in to St Marie's R C Church for a few years. They were bought by Sir John Holder of Brewery fame who lived at Pitmaston, Moor Green. At that time, there was a ringing room one floor up. Access would have been via the outside door at the base of the tower, up the stone stairs and in through a door into the chamber; the blocked-up doorway can be seen from the present ground floor ringing room. During the rebuilding work of 1909, the ringing room floor in the tower was removed; ringing could therefore be done only from the ground floor level, though in fact, this was never done. From then until the restoration work in 1991, only certain bells could be swung for chiming but this was rare. The usual method of chiming the bells was with hammers operated from an Ellacombe chiming apparatus, by which the operator pulled ropes from within a frame on the wall. In 2012, the steel bells were replaced with a new peal of ten, seven of which were newly cast by John Taylor of Loughborough.

With the rapidly increasing population, especially following the erection of numerous shops and cottages directly opposite the church in St Mary's Row, thoughts turned again to providing additional accommodation for worshippers. This began with the idea of building a completely new church in the east of the village which became St Agnes Church, consecrated in 1884, as a second worship centre within the parish and eventually gaining parish status in its own right in 1914. However, more space was required more immediately and a purpose-built wooden construction with corrugated iron roof was erected on the glebe land opposite the vicarage in 1879. The total cost including all fittings was £635 and it was perhaps affectionately known as the Temporary Church or 'Tin Tabernacle'. When it was no longer required, it was sold to the Vicar of Edgbaston in 1885 for £150. It was dismantled and erected on Pershore Road and can still be today as the church hall of the Church of SS Mary and Ambrose, Edgbaston.

Despite a Parish Meeting in 1878 resolving that nothing be done in the way of altering the Parish Church, it became clear that an enlarged space was required even with the Temporary Church and the building of St Agnes. J. A. Chatwin produced plans to expand on the north side with the creation of a new North aisle and arcade of six columns. The contract was given to the builders, Sapcotes, at a total cost in the region of £1700 and, to their credit, not a single service was lost during the building work. It was consecrated in May 1885 and provided an additional 326 sittings of which 150 were free. In 1887, the larger organ chamber was built and a new organ installed at a cost of £750. It was built by Henry Jones and Son of London for the National Art Treasures Exhibition at Folkestone in 1886. It is enclosed in a handsome carved case of solid oak, and was the inspiration of the parish organist Frederick H Bell to commemorate Queen Victoria's 50th Jubilee. This organ is still in use today.

Further additions were made by the Chatwins, father J. A. and son P. B., in 1891 with a Parish Vestry at the west end which became the choir vestry and in 1897 when the Chancel was enlarged and transept erected on the south side of the Chancel for even more additional seating. Subsequently, this was transformed into a side chapel and is now known as the Lady Chapel In 1904, a finely ornate alabaster Reredos was erected at the High Altar in memory of Frederick H Bell who died in 1903. Unfortunately, this was damaged beyond repair by a bomb in December 1940 which also destroyed a good deal of the stained glass.

The major work of P. B. (Philip) Chatwin was the expansion of the building to the south in 1909–10 with the erection of a new south aisle and clerestory built with increased roof height and a south arcade of columns to match those on north. Old oak high pews were cut down to their present size. Doors were also created at South-East and South-West ends, the latter replacing a previous door to the east. At this time, the West gallery was removed, revealing the medieval arch. The total seating was then 907.

During the 1920s and 1930s, much was done to beautify the interior of the church and a Sacristy was added on the north side of High Altar sanctuary in 1934. In the same year, with a bequest in memory of Cllr. F. D. Tippetts, one of the founders of the Moseley Park & Pool Co Ltd., a fine pair of wrought iron gates was installed by the Bromsgrove Guild of Applied Arts, famous for the Buckingham Palace gates. The Churchyard was closed by Order in Council in 1981. There is now a dedicated Garden of Remembrance for the interment of ashes.

The church is medieval.

== Patterns of Worship at St. Mary's ==
Regular Sunday Worship

- 8:00am Holy Communion
- 10:00am Sung Eucharist
- 6:30pm Evensong

Weekday Worship

- 9.00am Morning Prayer

== Patterns of Worship at St. Anne's ==
Regular Sunday Worship

- 11:00am Sung Eucharist

== List of Vicars ==
- John Robert Davison (1852–1876) during whose Incumbency St Mary's became an Ecclesiastical Parish
- William H Colmore (1876–1907)
- Charles E Hopton (1907–1927)
- Arthur Nesham Bax (1928–1943)
- C. Theodore Cribb (1945–1962)
- Frederick C. Carpenter (1962–1968)
- Lorys Davies (1968–1981)
- Robin Howard (1981–1987)
- Hayward Osborne (1988–2001)
- Averyl Bradbrook (2002–2005)
- Jeremy Dussek (2007 – 2014) then Canon Precentor and Sacrist at Chester Cathedral
- Duncan Strathie (2015–2023)
- Angela Hannafin (2024-present)

== Music ==
Music has always played a part in services at St. Mary's and for more than the past hundred years the church has maintained a strong choral tradition. There are currently two choirs, firstly the St Mary's Choir, a traditional Robed Choir consisting of some 18 treble choristers (boys and girls) and 12 "back row" (Altos, Tenors and Basses), many of whom were formerly Trebles in the choir. There is also the St Mary's Singers consisting of adult singers including female sopranos.

The Robed Choir as well as singing for the services of the church, undertakes singing holidays deputising for established Cathedral Choirs during their vacations. For many years they have had a choral exchange with the Eschersheim Youth Choir in Frankfurt-am-Main, Germany (the latest in February 2005). In February 2000 and again in February 2004 the choir undertook a singing tour to Atlanta, Georgia, USA. During August 2006, they were Choir in Residence at Washington National Cathedral, USA during August 2006. Residencies has included Ripon Cathedral (2009), Portsmouth Cathedral (2008), St Asaph's Cathedral in Wales, Sherborne Abbey, Salisbury Cathedral and Romsey Abbey (2010) and in 2011 at St Patrick's Cathedral, Dublin. In 2012 they were in residence at St David's Cathedral in Wales. This along with singing occasional services on Saturdays during the year, including Birmingham Cathedral, Hereford Cathedral, Bath Abbey, Gloucester Cathedral and Derby Cathedral.

The St Mary's Singers has shared tours with the Robed Choir in Atlanta and the last few exchanges in Frankfurt, but have also held their own short breaks in Frankfurt and Prague. In 2013 they began visits to the Anglican Chaplaincy on the Costa del Sol at Los Boliches. They also sang Mass at Malaga Cathedral. They have sung occasional services at Birmingham Cathedral and at Tewkesbury Abbey in 1977. They sing for the opening and closing services for the 3D Course for the Birmingham Diocese at Birmingham Cathedral. In 2015 they shared the Robed Choir's residency at Wells Cathedral and will do so again at St. Edmundsbury in 2016.

Finally there is also a small choir called St Mary's Schola, which consists of a double quartet of singers drawn from the Robed choir and began sharing concerts at Moseley Festival with Rich Batsford. The concerts brought together musicians from different faith backgrounds, expressing spirituality through music. This collaboration is known as "Musituality". This saw a concert in 2009 with a full capacity audience at Birmingham Cathedral with Buddhist-inspired music (Rich Batsford), Christian music (St. Mary's Schola) and Muslim music (A’ashiq Al Rasul). A further concert in 2010 at the Birmingham Buddhist Centre saw the same collaboration. They are also to sing Choral Evensong at Derby Cathedral in September 2010 with a capella music including Parry's My Soul There is a Country, Gibbon's Short Service and Aichinger's Factus Est Repente. In 2011 they did a successful residential at St Alban's Cathedral.

=== Organ ===
The church possesses an organ dating from 1887 by Henry Jones. An overhaul by Nicholsons in 1966 turned the instrument to face down the Nave and replaced the mechanical action with tubular pneumatic. A new console was provided while retaining the original Jones console for historic interest. A tonal revision in 1996 by Chris Kearl and Trevor Tipple of Worcester restored the essentially English character of the instrument and returned some of the Jones pipework lost in the 1966 rebuild. A specification of the organ can be found on the National Pipe Organ Register. 7 May 2016 marks the launch of the appeal to renovate the organ – a celebrity recital given by David Briggs will inaugurate the fund. Briggs, a former St. Mary's chorister, is Organist Emeritus at Gloucester Cathedral, and gives regular masterclasses at the Royal Northern College of Music and Cambridge University. He has a busy schedule as a concert artist, composer and organ advisor. He resides in Boston, Massachusetts. He made his debut at the BBC Proms on 14 August 2010 as part of "Bach Day" playing pieces by J S Bach. He became Artist in Residence at St James Cathedral, Toronto, Canada on 1 September 2012, with responsibilities including celebrity recitals, playing regularly at services, composing liturgical music for the cathedral, and working on the establishment of a vision for the music program including the design and installation of a new organ or organs and relevant acoustical enhancements. More detail is available on the church site:

=== List of Organists ===
- F H Bell 1871 – 1903
- George H Mann 1903 – 1937
- Frank Ford 1937 – 1955
- Eric Read 1956 – 1957
- John E Fryer 1957 – 1962
- David Hart 1962 – 1964
- Norman Dyson 1964 – 1971 (later organist of St Augustine's Church, Edgbaston)
- Adrian Powers 1971 – 1977
- David Whelton 1977 – 1978
- Michael J Perrier 1978 –

=== List of Assistant Organists ===
- George Howard Mann 1892 – 1903
- Paul Hodgetts 1993 – 1995
- Victoria Gravenor 1996 – 2001
- Ian Biggs 2001 – 2011

== Bells ==
The tower formerly contained eight steel bells, originally hung at St Marie's, Sheffield (now the Roman Catholic Cathedral), where they were replaced by traditional bells after only 12 years of service because of the dreadful noise they made. The steel bells (16 long cwt 3 qr 3 lb; 1,879 lb or 852 kg) in D were sold to a local Moseley businessman who presented them to St Mary's in 1874. These were removed in January 2012.

A replacement ring of ten bells (tenor 18 long cwt 1 qr 2 lb; 2,046 lb or 928 kg) in F, consisting of seven new and three from Greenock, was installed and rung for the first time in October 2012 to mark the Queen's Diamond Jubilee.

== Notable burials ==
St. Mary's contains the family vaults of the Holmes family, which includes Edward Holmes, Birmingham architect. Inside the church, there are memorials to William Congreve Russell and Rebecca Anderton. The churchyard contains the gravestones of Joseph Lucas and John Avins among many others. There is also a war grave of a World War I soldier.
