= Alfred Croom =

English cricketer

Personal information
- Full name: Alfred John William Croom
- Born: 23 May 1896; West Reading, Berkshire, England
- Died: 16 August 1947 (aged 51); Oldbury, Worcestershire, England
- Batting: Right-handed
- Bowling: Right-arm off break
- Relatives: Leslie Croom (Son)

Domestic team information
- Years: Team
- 1914–1922: Berkshire
- 1922–1939: Warwickshire

Career statistics
Competition	First-class
Matches	398
Runs scored	17,692
Batting average	31.42
100s/50s	24/100
Top score	211
Balls bowled	9,570
Wickets	138
Bowling average	44.00
5 wickets in innings	2
10 wickets in match	–
Best bowling	6/65
Catches/stumpings	299/–
- Source: Cricinfo, 17 June 2022

Alfred John William Croom (23 May 1896 – 16 August 1947) was an English cricketer. He was a right-hand opening batsman and right-arm off-spin bowler who played for Warwickshire.

== Early life and career ==
Born in Reading, Berkshire, Croom began his cricketing career with Berkshire in 1914. Following the First World War he played three more seasons of minor counties cricket before joining Warwickshire. After single appearances in 1922 and 1923 he became a regular by the late 1920s.

Between 1922 and 1939 Croom played a total of 394 first-class matches for Warwickshire, he also represented an England XI, Sir Lindsay Parkinson's XI and appeared twice for the Players against the Gentlemen.

Croom scored a total of 17,692 first-class runs at an average of 31.42, passing 1,000 runs in a season for twelve consecutive years between 1928 and 1939. His most productive season came in 1931 when he scored 1,584 runs at 38.63, including six centuries. Described by Wisden as sound and stylish, Croom scored 24 first-class centuries, the highest of which was an innings of 211 against Worcestershire at Edgbaston in 1934, sharing in a first-wicket stand of 272 with Norman Kilner.

Croom's off-spin bowling took 138 wickets at an average of 44.00, twice taking five wickets or more in an innings. His best figures were 6/65 against Glamorgan at Swansea in 1930. It was a good match for Croom as he scored 96 and took three further wickets.

Croom held the Warwickshire partnership records for the 8th and 9th wicket, both set during the 1925 season. In May he scored 51 not out, batting at number 10, to share in a 154 run stand with George Stephens and in July he scored his maiden century as he shared in a 228 run partnership with Bob Wyatt which helped recover the Warwickshire innings from 77/7. The ninth wicket partnership with Stephens was surpassed in 2009 by Jonathan Trott and Jeetan Patel.

Croom's Son, Leslie, played four matches for Warwickshire in 1949.
