= Four Oaks, Sutton Coldfield =

Area of Sutton Coldfield, West Midlands, England

Coordinates: 52°35′10″N 1°50′16″W

Four Oaks
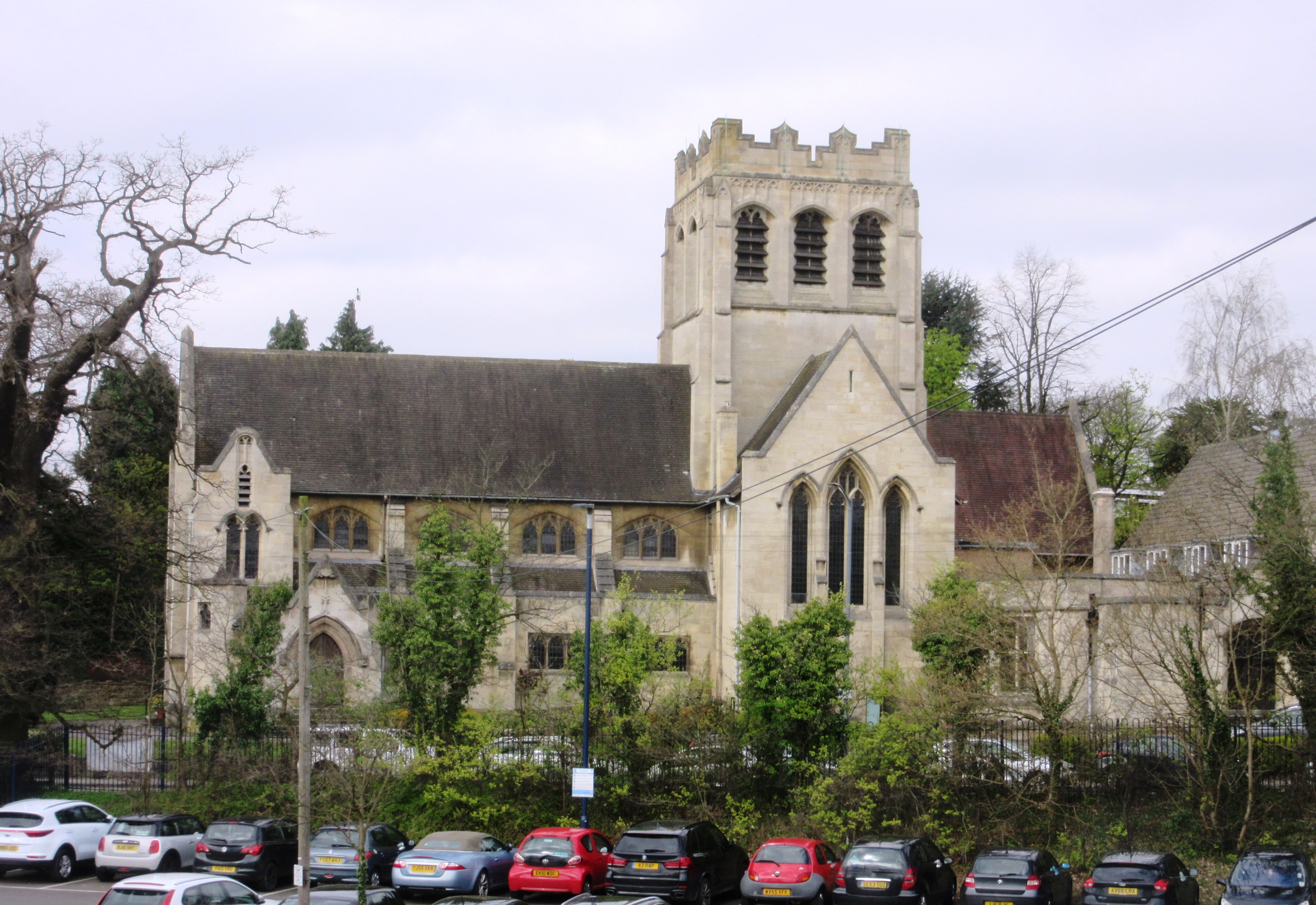

- Location within the West Midlands
- OS grid reference: SP115975
- Metropolitan borough: Birmingham
- Metropolitan county: West Midlands
- Region: West Midlands
- Country: England
- Sovereign state: United Kingdom
- Post town: SUTTON COLDFIELD
- Postcode district: B74, B75
- Dialling code: 0121
- Police: West Midlands
- Fire: West Midlands
- Ambulance: West Midlands
- UK Parliament: Sutton Coldfield

Four Oaks is an affluent residential area in Sutton Coldfield, Birmingham, West Midlands, lying along the north and east borders of Sutton Park. Four Oaks is situated approximately 7 1/2 miles (12 kilometres) north of Birmingham City Centre, and is bordered by Sutton Park, Streetly, Mere Green, Little Aston and Sutton Coldfield Town Centre. Four Oaks has a population of 21,690 as of 2004, and is part of the Sutton Four Oaks electoral ward.

== Four Oaks Estate ==
In 1677, Henry Folliott, 3rd Baron Folliott of Ballyshannon bought 60 acres (24 hectares) of woodland and built Four Oaks Hall. Folliott died in 1716, but his widow continued to live in Four Oaks Hall until her death in 1751. The estate was sold to Simon Luttrell, 1st Earl of Carhampton, who remodelled and modernised the house. In 1757, he bought a further 50 acres (20 ha) of woodland to annex his estate and form a deer park. He sold the estate to Thomas Gresley in 1778, who sold the estate to Sir Hugh Bateman, 1st Baronet of Hartington Hall in 1785, who in turn sold the estate to Sir Edmund Cradock-Hartopp, 1st Baronet in 1792. In 1827, Hartopp bought 35 acres (14 ha) of woodland to further increase the size of the deer park. The estate was sold to Hubert de Burgh-Canning, 2nd Marquess of Clanricarde for residential development in 1868. Roads were named to commemorate the history of the estate, and between 1895 and 1915 approximately 200 houses were built on the estate, forming Four Oaks Estate. The neglected and dilapidated Four Oaks Hall was demolished in 1898, and the site is now occupied by Carhampton House.

Four Oaks Estate is a mainly residential area with the Four Oaks Tennis Club at its heart, approximately enclosed by Lichfield Road, Four Oaks Road, Sutton Park and Sutton Park Line railway line. One of the most expensive residential areas in the West Midlands, the Park's roads are home to some of the region's wealthiest residents. Four Oaks Park is characterised by its large houses and tree-lined, speed-humped roads. The houses on the Estate are individually designed by prominent architects such as Charles Bateman, and most sell for at least £2 million. Many of the houses have received listed building status. Four Oaks Estate is also home to Four Oaks Tennis Club, which was founded in 1906.

The roads on Four Oaks Estate are managed by Four Oaks Estate Ltd and run by a formally constituted Board of Directors, who are all Estate residents, supported by an appointed Secretary & Treasurer.

Four Oaks Estate Ltd submitted in 2019 a Lawful Development Certificate application 2019/03339/PA to Birmingham Council, that was Refused on the grounds that the Estate roads were Highways maintained at private expense, meaning the public enjoy the benefit of a public right of way over the Estate roads for any and all purposes and at all times, the same as any other publicly maintained highway. The plan was to create a large exclusive gated community consisting of 340 houses, by installing 8 sets of perimeter gates on the 8 entrance points into the private residential estate. However it is unlawful to obstruct a highway and also unlawful to obstruct a public right of way, which gates would do.

A similar planning application at the neighbouring Little Aston Park similar exclusive private residential estate 1 mile away was recently Refused at a Lichfield Council Planning Committee meeting, and subsequent Planning Inspectorate Appeal Dismissed, as to create a large exclusive gated community would undermine social cohesion by creating social segregation. However a subsequent application for Certificates of Lawfulness were subsequently approved by Lichfield Council for 6 sets of perimeter gates, despite Little Aston Park Estate having a public church, golf club, public post box within its grounds, and their Estate roads having an unknown legal owner, meaning the legal owner could not have installed legal signs to prevent dedication of the roads as highways. This raises the question of the legal validity of Little Aston Park's signs installed by residents, and therefore raises the possibility their roads are also highways maintained at private expense and also a public right of way.

=== Notable houses ===
==== Barker Road ====
- No 17, Withens by William Bidlake 1898
- No 26, Beaconsfield by Thomas Walter Francis Newton and Alfred Edward Cheatle 1900

==== Bracebridge Road ====
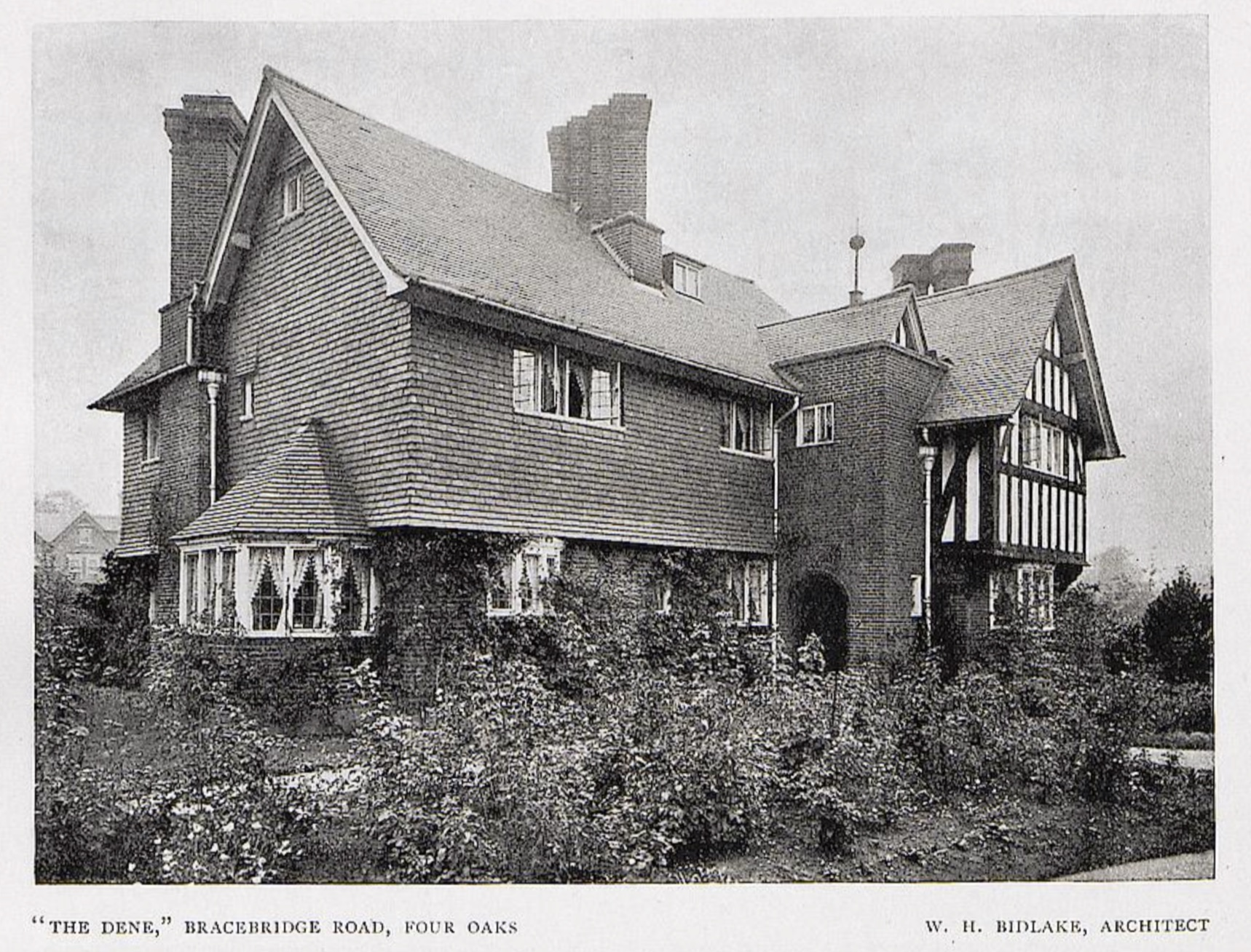
No 2 Bracebridge Road, The Dene, William Bidlake 1895-96

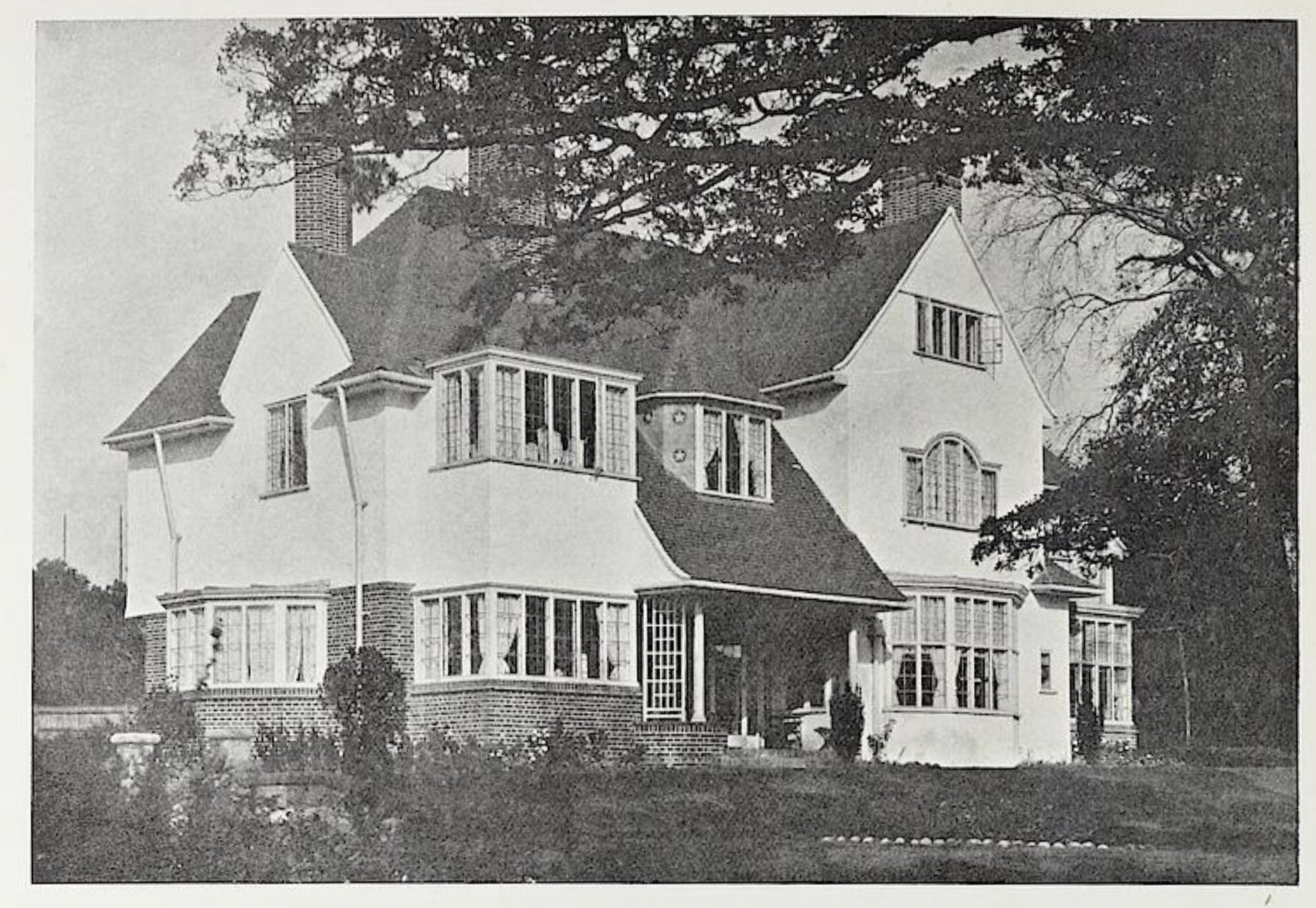
No 23 Bracebridge Road, Hindecliffe, Owen Parsons 1905

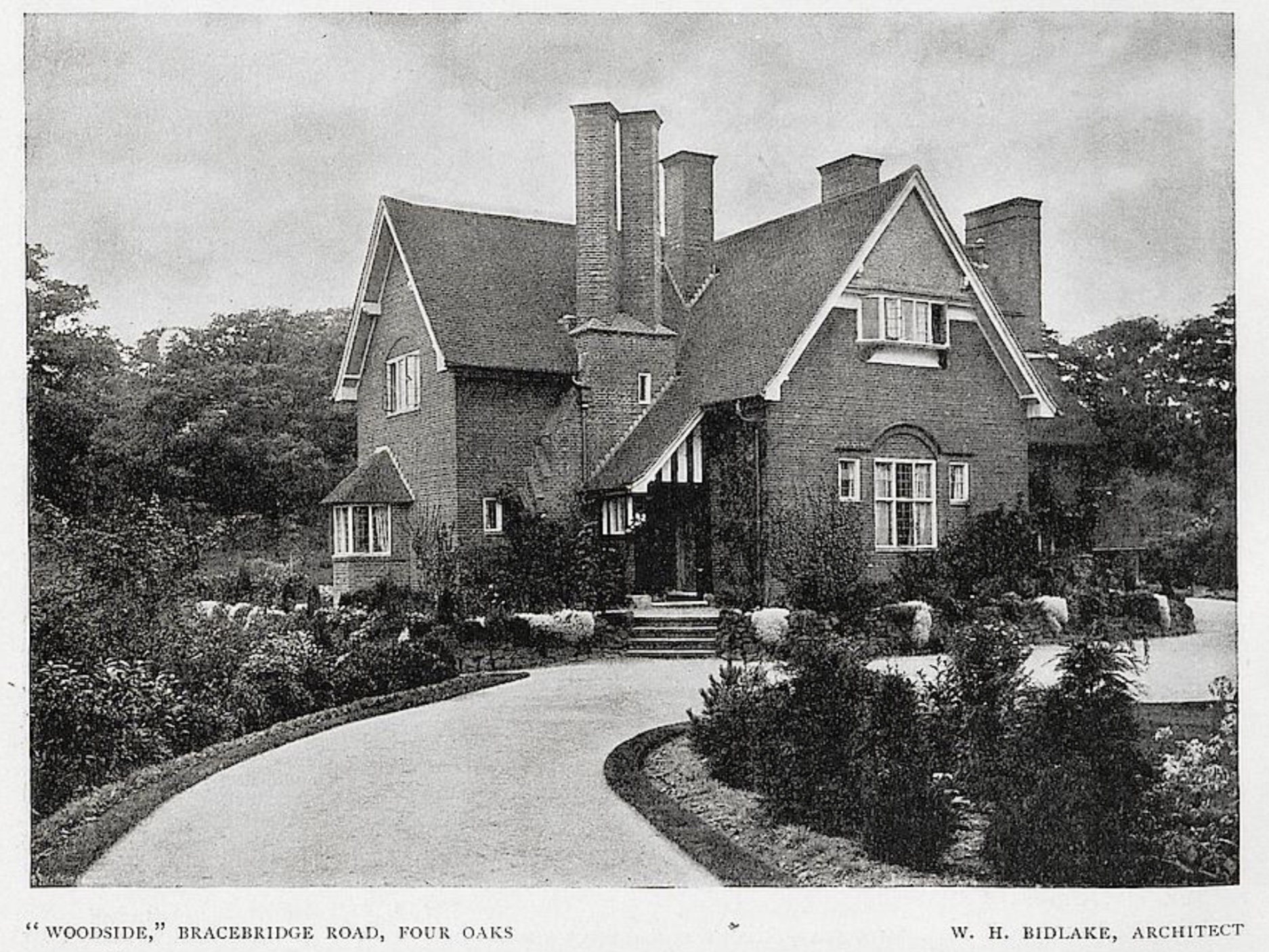
No 51 Bracebridge Road, Woodside, William Bidlake 1897

- No 2, The Dene by William Bidlake 1895-96
- No 8, Red Mullion by Owen Parsons 1929
- No 12, by Edward Haywood-Farmer 1902
- No 14, Maes Y Lledr (originally Hawkesford) by Charles Bateman 1901-02
- No 16, The Lawns, by Owen Parsons 1899
- No 23, Hindecliffe by Owen Parsons 1905
- No 35, Bryn Teg by Charles Bateman 1904
- No 51, Woodside by William Bidlake 1897
- No 57, Kenwood by Harry Weedon 1927

==== Four Oaks Road ====
- No 19, Dunster by William de Lacy Aherne 1901
- No 21, Avon Croft by Crouch and Butler 1900
- No 23, Cressington by Crouch and Butler 1900
- No 43, by Crouch and Butler 1908
- No 45, by Crouch and Butler 1908

==== Hartopp Road ====
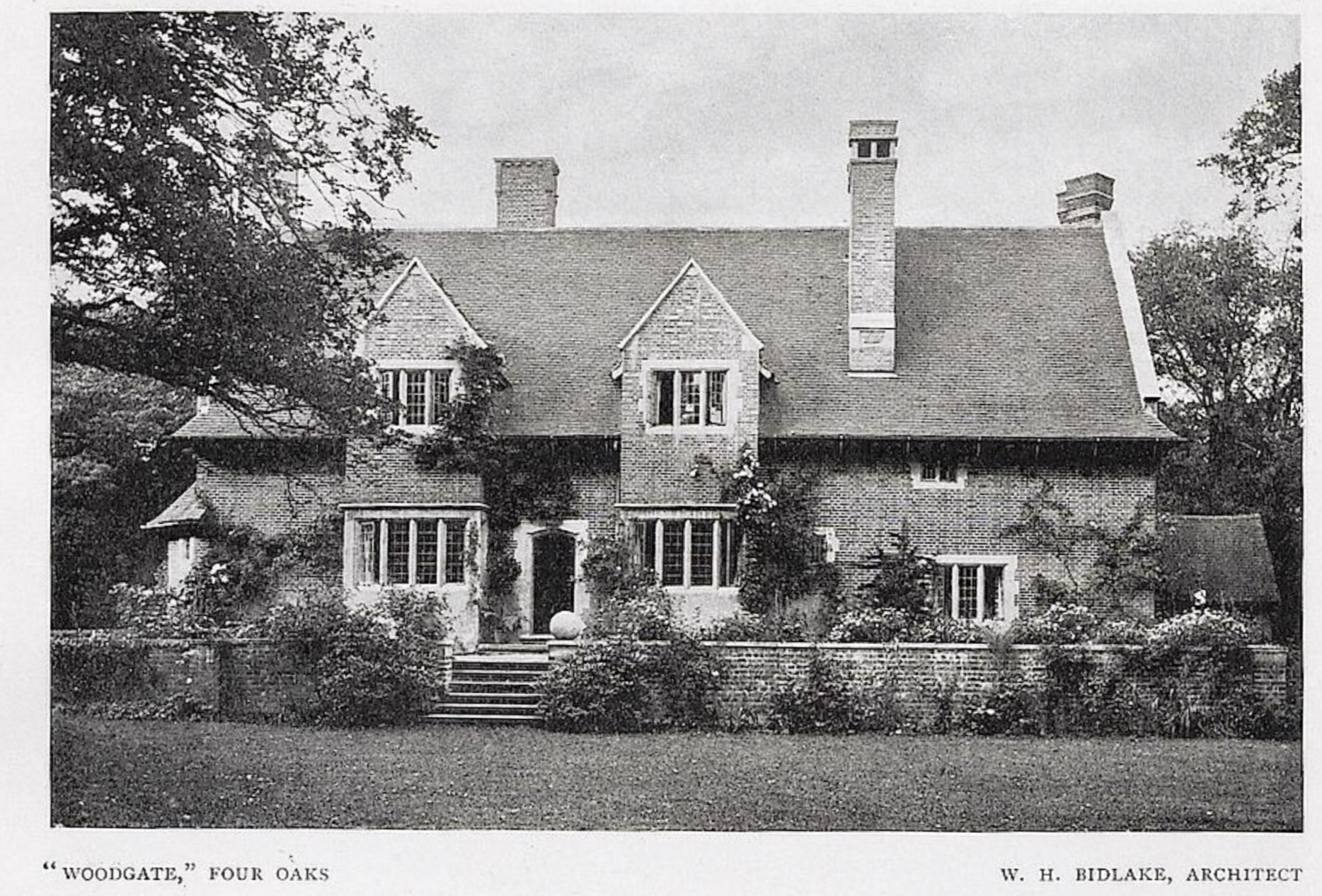
No 37 Hartopp Road, Woodgate, William Bidlake 1896

- Red House, by William de Lacy Aherne 1900
- No 1, Redlands by Charles Bateman 1903
- No. 9, by Edwin Francis Reynolds 1920
- No 16, Conyar by Crouch and Butler 1908
- No 18, Luttrell House by Crouch and Butler 1901
- No 34, Oakwood, formerly stables to The Hurst, by William Lethaby
- No 37, Woodgate by William Bidlake 1896

==== Ladywood Road ====
- No 19, late 19th century
- No 21, by Crouch and Butler 1906
- No 22, Redcroft by William Bidlake 1901-02

==== Lichfield Road ====
- No 147, Former South Lodge of Four Oaks Hall, 16th or 17th century

==== Luttrell Road ====
- No 5, Culross House by Owen Parsons 1928
- No 11, Carhampton House by Charles Bateman 1901-02
- No 16, by Crouch and Butler 1907
- No 18, by Crouch and Butler 1906

==== Wentworth Road ====
- No 6, Heathercourt by Crouch and Butler 1907
- No 10, by Crouch and Butler 1907
- No 15, by Cossins, Peacock and Bewlay 1908

== Transport ==
West Midlands Trains operate a frequent train service from Four Oaks railway station north to Lichfield and south to Redditch and Bromsgrove via Birmingham New Street and University (adjacent to the University of Birmingham and the Queen Elizabeth Hospital) on the Cross-City Line. The Sutton Park Line is a freight-only railway line that runs through Four Oaks from Walsall to Water Orton via Sutton Park.

There are also four bus services through Four Oaks operated by National Express West Midlands.

== Churches ==
All Saints' Church is the Church of England parish church in Four Oaks. It is situated at the junction of Walsall Road and Belwell Lane and is a Grade II* listed building.

Four Oaks Methodist Church is a Gothic Revival church located next to Four Oaks railway station at the junction of Four Oaks Road and Lichfield Road. Constructed between 1907 and 1908, the church was Grade II listed in 1976.

== Noted Person ==
Sir Thomas Acquin Martin (1850-1906) - Industrialist. Born in Four Oaks.
