= Moseley Forum =

Moseley Forum is a neighbourhood forum of local Moseley residents who represent a geographic area of Birmingham, England. The city has a number of neighbourhood forums, bodies recognised by the City Council, which allow local residents (non-politicians) to help shape local policies and local services.
