= George Stephens (cricketer) =

English cricketer

Personal information
- Full name: George William Stephens
- Born: 26 April 1889; Edgbaston, Warwickshire, England
- Died: 17 March 1950 (aged 60); Knowle, Warwickshire, England
- Batting: Right-handed
- Bowling: Right-arm leg-spin
- Relatives: Frank Stephens (brother)

Domestic team information
- Years: Team
- 1907 – 1925: Warwickshire

Career statistics
Competition	First-class
Matches	127
Runs scored	4171
Batting average	21.50
100s/50s	4/18
Top score	143
Balls bowled	91
Wickets	4
Bowling average	20.00
5 wickets in innings	0
10 wickets in match	0
Best bowling	2/25
Catches/stumpings	51/–
- Source: Cricinfo, 9 March 2015

George William Stephens (26 April 1889 – 17 March 1950) was an English amateur cricketer who played first-class cricket for Warwickshire from 1907 to 1925.

A middle-order batsman, Stephens also acted as county captain in several matches from 1912 to 1924, and was the official captain in 1919, when Warwickshire won only one of their 14 matches and finished last. He made only 275 runs in the season at an average of 14.47. He was a more successful batsman in 1920 when he made his first century and scored 612 runs at 43.71. His highest score was 143, made in 120 minutes, against Gloucestershire in 1923. In 1925 against Derbyshire he shared a ninth-wicket partnership of 154 with Alfred Croom which remained the county record until 2009. Warwickshire had been 154 for 8; Stephens scored 121 in 120 minutes.

His twin brother, Frank, also played for Warwickshire. Both brothers played in Warwickshire's first County Championship victory in 1911 and later served on the Warwickshire committee.
