= Owen Parsons =

English architect (1872–1944)

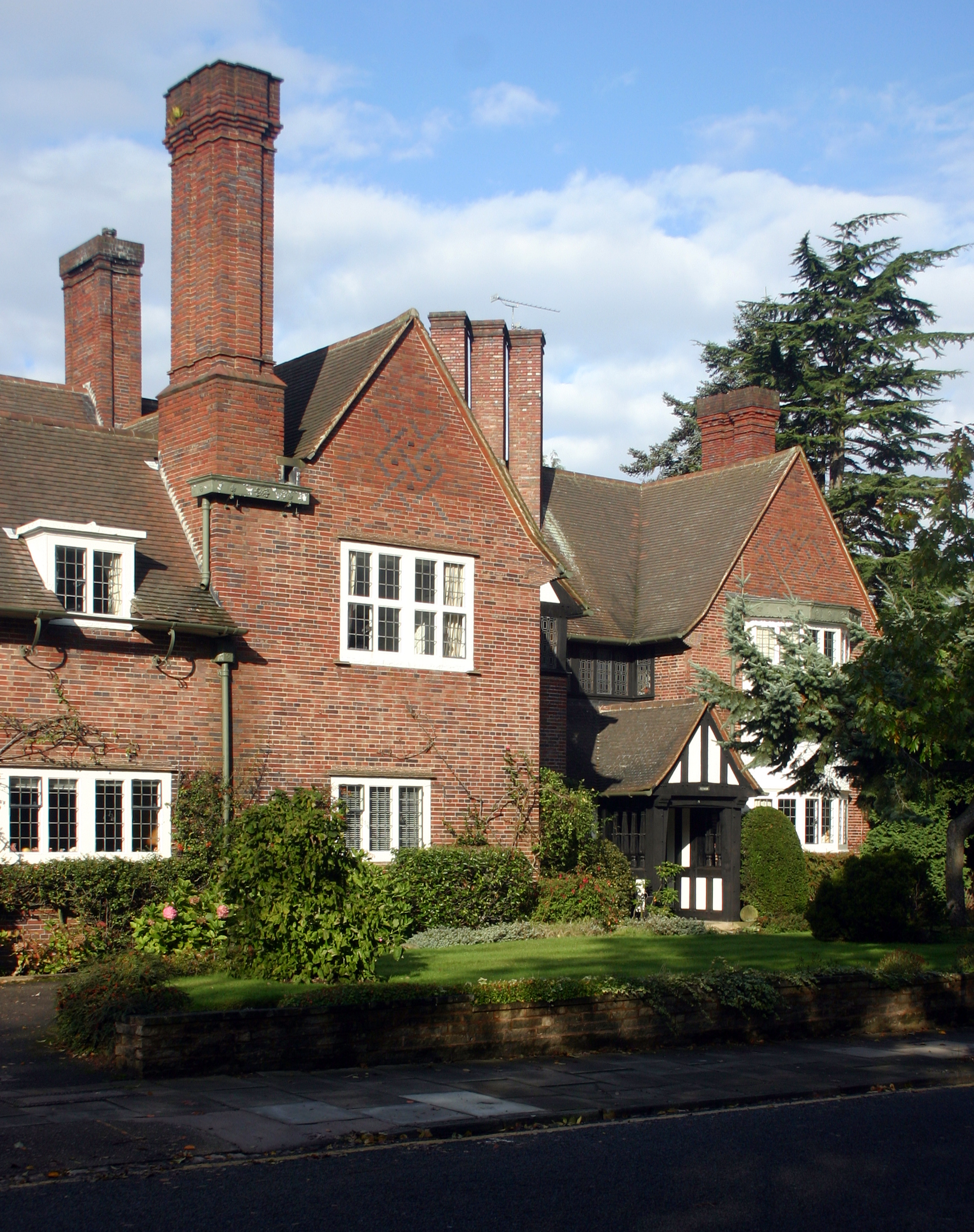
Kilmuir in Amesbury Road, Moseley, 1909

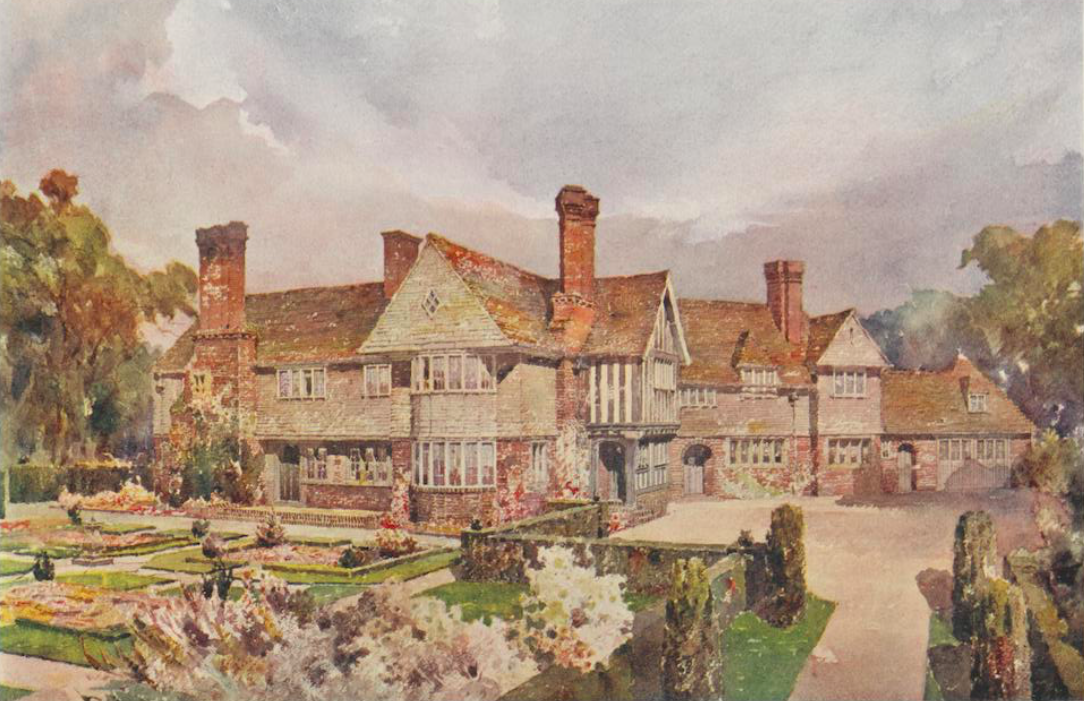
Tudor Lodge, 1 Colmore Crescent, Moseley, 1916

Owen Percy Parsons LRIBA (22 July 1872 – 15 February 1944) was an English architect who designed both speculative housing for rent and larger private commissions.

He was born in Balsall Heath, Birmingham to Councillor Thomas Parsons and Elizabeth Cox. He was articled to the architect John George Bland in 1893, and from 1895 began to practice. On Bland's death in 1898, he succeeded him in the practice at 14 Temple Street, Birmingham.

From 1902 onwards he designed a notable series of large private houses in Arts and Crafts styles in upmarket districts of Birmingham including Moseley, Kings Heath, Selly Park, Barnt Green and Four Oaks. In 1911 he was appointed LRIBA.

He married Winnifred O'Connor (1884–1956) in 1910 and this marriage produced one son and one daughter.

During the Second World War he worked as an assessor under the War Damage Commission. His son Flight Lieutenant Anthony Leslie Parsons (1915–1991) was a prisoner of war at the time.

He died of a heart attack on 15 February 1944 at his home, Holmwood, Green Hill Road, Wylde Green, Birmingham.

== Selected list of works ==
- Hindeliffe, Four Oaks, Birmingham
- The Lawns, 16 Bracebridge Road, Four Oaks 1899
- 19 and 21 Salisbury Road, Moseley 1901
- Overdale, Russell Road, Moseley 1901
- 47-65 Selly Park Road, Selly Park, Birmingham 1905
- 130 Oxford Road, Moseley, Birmingham c1907
- Kilmuir Amesbury Road, Moseley 1909 Grade II listed.
- Kingsthorpe, 40 Wake Green Road, Moseley, Birmingham 1910
- Holmwood, 14 Greenhill Road, Sutton Coldfield 1912
- Ashley Lodge (now Tudor Lodge), 1 Colmore Crescent, Birmingham, Moseley Grade II listed
- Six villas, 336-346 (since renumbered) Bristol Road, Northfield, Birmingham.
- Walmley Golf Club House 1919
- Tintagel, Greenhill Road, Sutton Coldfield 1919
- Donegal, 3 Beech Hill Road, Sutton Coldfield 1920
- Talgarth, 2 Greenhill Road, Sutton Coldfield 1923
- Four villas, 49-61 Fiery Hill Road, Barnt Green 1924
- Greenhill Cottage, 10 Greenhill Road, Sutton Coldfield 1924
- Two villas, 35-37 Fiery Hill Road, Barnt Green 1926
- Culross House, 5 Luttrell Road, Sutton Coldfield 1928
- Red Mullion, 8 Bracebridge Road, Four Oaks 1929

== Bibliography ==
- Rathbone, Niky; Bassindale, John (2009), "Owen Parsons", in Ballard, Phillada (ed.), Birmingham's Victorian and Edwardian Architects, Wetherby: Oblong Creative, pp. 555–566, ISBN 978-0955657627
