= St Agnes' Church, Moseley =

Church in Moseley, Birmingham, England

St Agnes’ Church, Moseley
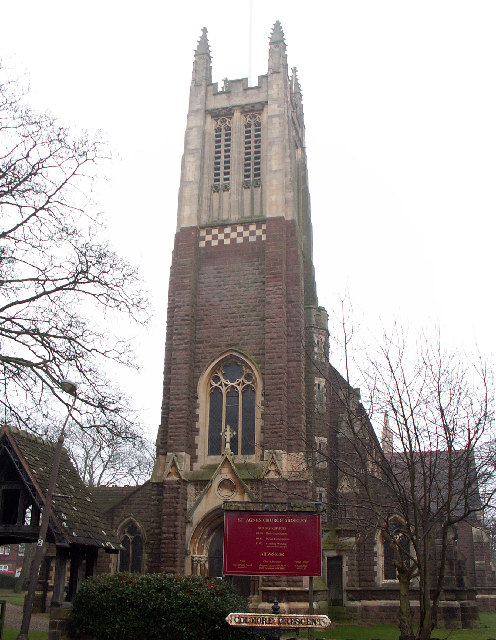
- St Agnes’ Church, Moseley
- St Agnes’ Church, Moseley
- 52°26′21″N 1°52′30″W
- OS grid reference: SP 08584 82365
- Location: Moseley
- Country: England
- Denomination: Church of England
- Website: stagneschurch.co.uk

History
- Dedication: St Agnes

Architecture
- Heritage designation: Grade II* listed
- Architect: William Davis
- Groundbreaking: 1883
- Completed: 1884

Administration
- Diocese: Birmingham
- Archdeaconry: Birmingham
- Deanery: Moseley
- Parish: St Agnes, Moseley

St Agnes Church, Moseley is a Grade II listed parish church in the Church of England in Moseley, Birmingham.

== History ==
It was designed by the architect William Davis in the Decorated Gothic style. Work started in 1883 and it opened in 1884. The East window contains the subject of "Christ in Glory" and was designed by Ballantine and Gardiner of Edinburgh and installed at a cost of £600 to celebrate the Diamond Jubilee of Queen Victoria in 1897.

The west tower was completed in 1932 by Charles Bateman. The lych-gate in the churchyard was designed by James A. Swan and installed in 1938. In the interior Swan designed the panelling, choir stalls, pulpit, lectern, screens and doors dating from 1939 which was carved by Robert Pancheri of The Bromsgrove Guild of Applied Arts.

The church was damaged by bombing in 1940. Temporary repairs were carried out and it re-opened on 23 March 1941.

St Agnes' Church is within the conservative evangelical tradition of the Church of England, and has passed resolutions to show that it rejects the ordination and/or leadership of women.

== Vicars ==
- Revd. J.W. Pyddoke 1911 - 1918 (afterwards vicar of Pleasley, Derbyshire)
- Revd. C.A.H. Going 1918 - 1935 (formerly vicar of Pleasley, Derbyshire, afterwards Rector of St Peter’s and St Paul’s, Fitz, Shropshire)
- Revd. J.P. Wilkinson 1936 - 1959
- Revd. Stephen Beck 1959 - 1983

== Organ ==
The church has a three manual pipe organ by William Hill & Sons. It was originally built for St Mark's Church, Leicester in 1871 but was moved to St Agnes’ Church and opened in 1994. A specification of the organ can be found on the National Pipe Organ Register.

=== Organists ===
- Thomas Beech 1884–86
- Thomas J. Richards 1886–1911 (afterwards organist of St Alban the Martyr, Birmingham)
- Thomas Appleby Matthews 1911–19
- Thomas J. Richards 1919–31 (formerly organist of St Alban the Martyr, Birmingham)
- W. H. Pasfield 1931–40 (formerly assistant organist at Dudley Parish Church)
- F. Bernard While

== Bells ==
The tower contains two bells, both cast in 1921 by John Taylor of Loughborough.
