= St Anne's Church, Moseley =

Church in Birmingham, United Kingdom

St. Anne's Church, Moseley
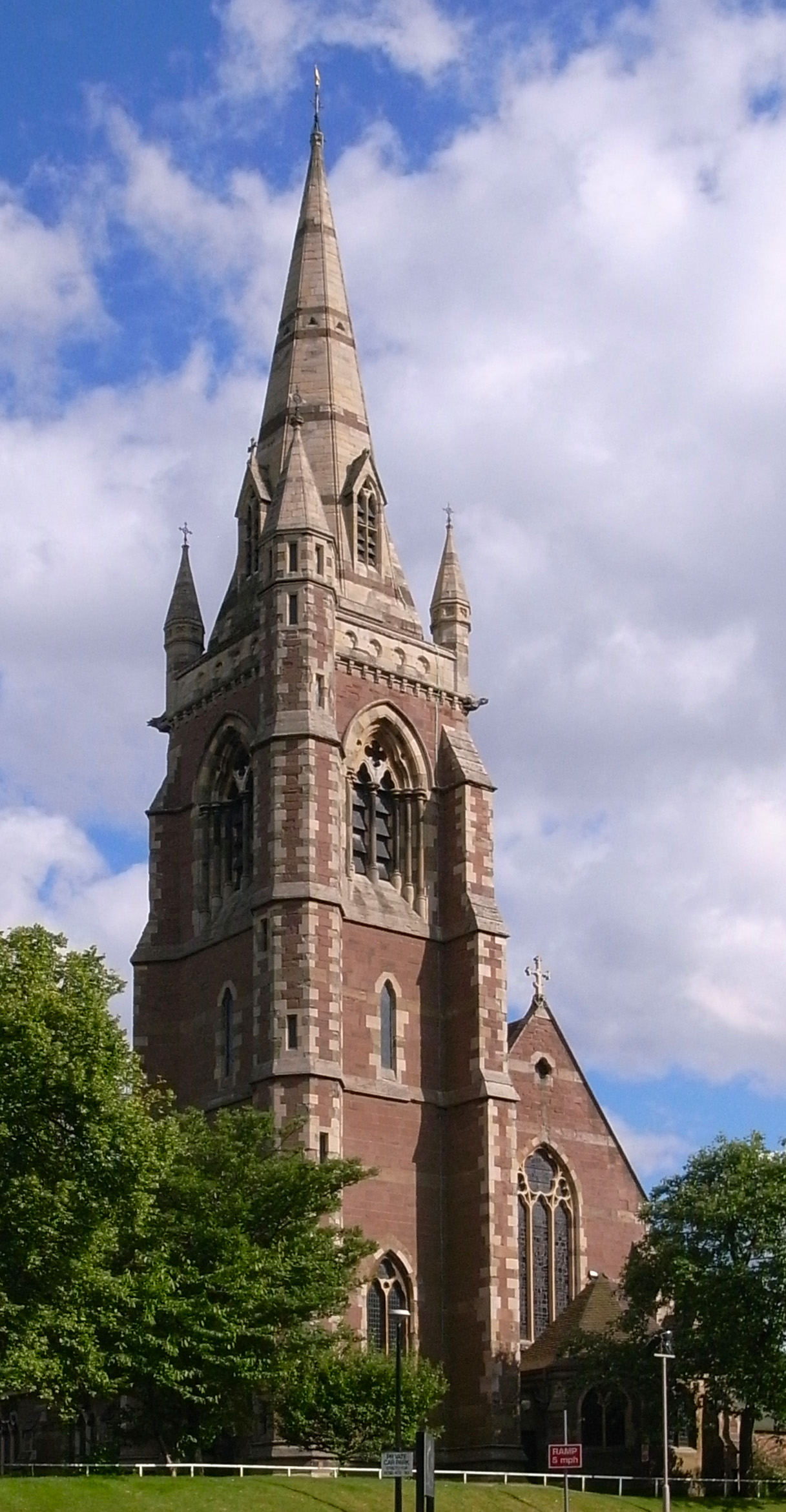
- St. Anne's Church, Moseley
- 52.4507°N 1.8915°W
- Denomination: Church of England
- Churchmanship: Broad Church

History
- Dedication: St. Anne

Administration
- Province: Canterbury
- Diocese: Birmingham
- Parish: Moseley

Clergy
- Vicar(s): Revd Angela Hannafin (Vicar) and Revd Magdalen Smith (Associate Vicar)

St. Anne's Church, Park Hill, Moseley is a parish church in the Church of England located in Moseley, Birmingham.

== History ==
The church dates from 1874 and is by the architect Frederick Preedy. It is Grade II listed. It was originally a separate parish, but is now part of a united benefice with St. Mary's Church, Moseley.

== List of Vicars ==
Robert Scott

- Robert Yaxley
- Leslie Brotherton
- Alan Reynolds
- Averyl Bradbook (2004–2005)
- Jeremy Dussek (2007–2014 )
- Duncan Strathie (2015–2023)
- Angela Hannafin (2024-present)

== Organ ==
The organ is by Brindley & Foster and dates from 1907. It was overhauled by Nicholson & Co (Worcester) Ltd in 1984. A specification of the organ can be found on the National Pipe Organ Register

The organ has been sampled and is the instrument which is provided with the Hauptwerk Virtual Organ.

== List of Organists ==
- W. Berridge-Hicks 1897 – c. 1912 – ???? (formerly organist of St. Aidan's Church, Small Heath)
- Herbert E . Knott c. 1920 and c. 1921
- Peter Howard
