= William de Lacy Aherne =

English architect

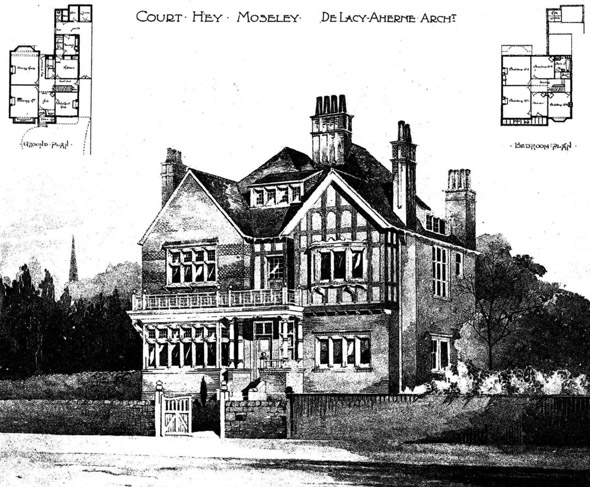
Court Hey, Moseley

William de Lacy Aherne FRIBA (17 April 1867 – 4 December 1945) was an English architect, notable for designing many Arts and Crafts houses in the Moseley area of Birmingham.

== Family ==
Born in Cheam, Surrey to William Aherne (b. 1841) and Emma Paterson (b. 1842), de Lacy Aherne came from a family of devout Plymouth Brethren, a faith that he ceased to share in early adulthood.

He married Annie Louise Thomas (1872 – 1942), daughter of William Thomas (1841 - 1911) and Mary Louise Wright (1847 - 1912) in 1898 and they had two sons- the actors Pat Aherne and *Brian Aherne- and a daughter, Elana Aherne. When he died on 4 December 1945 he was living at 25 Ladbrooke Road, London.

== Career ==
In 1886 or 1887 he took a job as an architect's apprentice in Birmingham, where he worked for the King's Norton and Northfield Sanitary Authority. His earliest recorded private commissions were in the King's Norton area and date from 1889, and in 1890 he was elected to the Birmingham Architectural Association.

In 1898 de Lacy Aherne was commissioned to build a series of houses by his father-in-law, whose local contacts in the Moseley area were helpful to the rising young architect; his work quickly became fashionable among the rapidly growing and wealthy professional middle class of the area. From 1903 onwards he designed a large number of speculative houses in high-status Moseley roads such as Russell Road, Salisbury Road, Amesbury Road, Reddings Road and Oxford Road, financed either by himself or in conjunction with local building firms. Several of these houses, including 9 St Agnes Road and 110 and 112 Oxford Road are now listed buildings. He was probably also the architect of Blackhill, the home of Birmingham Repertory Theatre founder Barry Jackson in the Malvern Hills.

He was elected a Licentiate of the Royal Institute of British Architects in 1926 and became a Fellow in 1931.

== Selected works ==
- House and post office, 100 The Green, Kings Norton 1889
- 30 and 32 Bell's Lane, Walker's Heath 1891
- 1, 2 and 3 The Fordrough, West Heath 1895
- 64 Redditch Road, Kings Norton 1895
- Ford House, Castle Road, Kenilworth 1896
- Court Hey, 25 Chantry Road, Moseley, Birmingham 1896
- 63 Salisbury Road, Moseley, Birmingham 1897
- 60 Salisbury Road, Moseley, Birmingham 1897
- 2 and 2a The Green, King's Norton, Birmingham 1897
- 17 Grove Avenue, Moseley, Birmingham 1897
- 67 and 69 Pershore Road South, Kings Norton 1898
- 71, 73, 75 and 77 Cotton Lane, Moseley, Birmingham 1898
- 112 Salisbury Road, Moseley, Birmingham 1898
- The Pleasance, Monyhull Hall Road, Kings Norton 1898 (now Barbara Hart House)
- 207 and 209 Ancestor Road, Moseley, Birmingham 1899
- Twenty two houses, 3-25 Baldwin Road, Kings Norton 1899
- Twenty two houses, 4-24 Parson's Hill, Kings Norton 1899
- 67 Cotton Lane, Moseley, Birmingham 1899
- 183 and 185, Alcester Road, Moseley 1899
- 13 St Agnes Road, Moseley, Birmingham 1900
- 45 Greenhill Road, Moseley, Birmingham 1900
- 41 Dyott Road, Moseley, Birmingham 1900
- 1, 3, 5, 7, 9, 11, 13 St Albans Road, Moseley, Birmingham 1900-01
- 9 St Agnes Road, Moseley, Birmingham 1906-07
- Two houses, 110 and 112 Oxford Road, Moseley, Birmingham 1906-07
- Two houses, 37-39 Poplar Avenue, Bearwood, Birmingham 1908
- House, 40 Reddings Road, Moseley, Birmingham 1908
- The Grey House, 28 Amesbury Road, Moseley, Birmingham 1908
- Three houses, 30-34 Amesbury Road, Moseley, Birmingham 1908
- Five houses, 42-50 Reddings Road, Moseley, Birmingham 1908
- House, 40 Sommerville Road, Sutton Coldfield 1910
- Three houses, 189-193 Russell Road, Moseley, Birmingham 1911
- Three houses, 42-46 Wake Green Road, Moseley Birmingham 1911
- House, 54 Sommerville Road, Sutton Coldfield 1911
- Inverblair, 52 Sommerville Road, Sutton Coldfield 1911
- Richmond, 50 Sommerville Road, Sutton Coldfield 1911
- Siviter House, 17 Ludgate Hill, Birmingham 1912
- Five houses, 78-86 Eastern Road, Wylde Green, Birmingham 1914
- House, 187 Russel Road, Moseley, Birmingham 1914
- House, 179 Russell Road, Moseley, Birmingham 1915
- House, 55 Russell Road, Moseley, Birmingham 1915

== Bibliography ==
- Wood, Christine (2009), "William de Lacey Aherne", in Ballard, Phillada (ed.), Birmingham's Victorian and Edwardian Architects, Wetherby: Oblong Creative, pp. 567–583, ISBN 978-0955657627
