= Moseley =

Area of Birmingham, England

Coordinates: 52.44671°N 1.88814°W

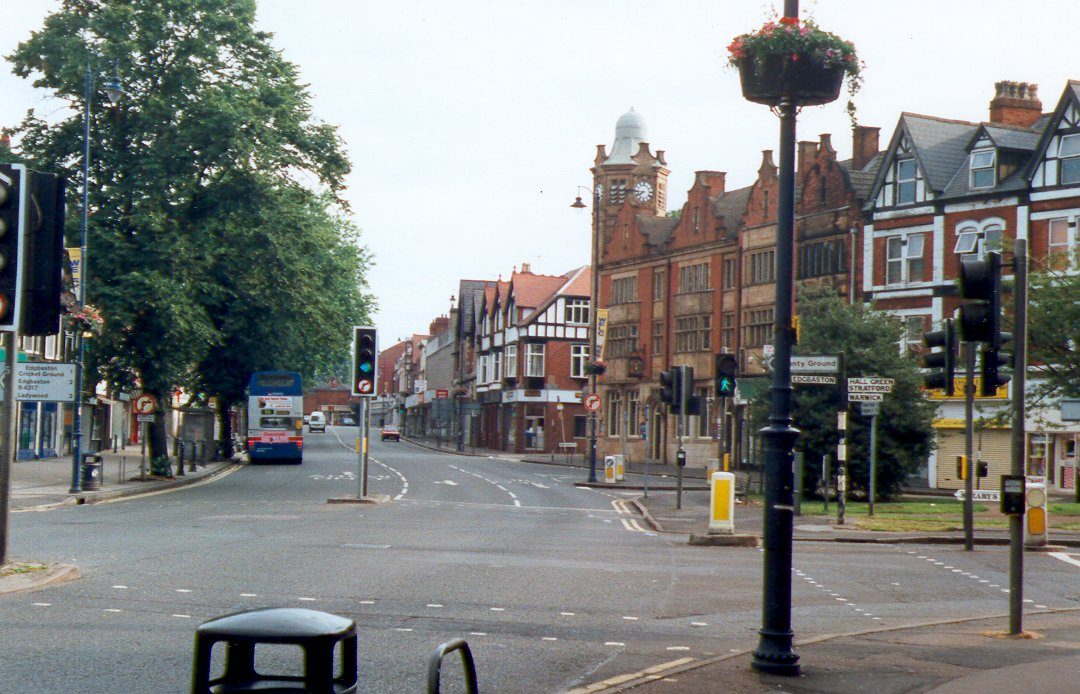
- Part of Moseley Village, at the junction of Alcester Road and St Marys Row

- Location within the West Midlands
- Population: 21,568 (estimate)
- OS grid reference: SP077832
- Metropolitan borough: Birmingham
- Metropolitan county: West Midlands
- Region: West Midlands
- Country: England
- Sovereign state: United Kingdom
- Post town: Birmingham
- Postcode district: B13
- Dialling code: 0121
- Police: West Midlands
- Fire: West Midlands
- Ambulance: West Midlands
- UK Parliament: Birmingham Hall Green and Moseley

Moseley (/ˈmoʊzliː/ MOZE-lee) is a suburb in south Birmingham, England, three miles (five kilometres) south of the city centre.

It is located within the eponymous Moseley ward of the constituency of Birmingham Hall Green and Moseley in the ceremonial county of the West Midlands. It historically lay within Worcestershire, abutting the county border with Warwickshire.

== History ==
Moseley was listed as a settlement within the manor of Bromsgrove in the Domesday Book of 1086 as Museleie, from the Anglo-Saxon mús (mouse) + leáh (lea, meadow), which translates as either 'mouse clearing' or 'mouse-sized (i.e. small) clearing'.

St Mary's Church, Moseley was licensed by the Bishop of Worcester (authorised by Pope Innocent VII) in February 1405. St Anne's Church, Moseley was opened in 1874 for the now extinct parish of Park Hill. The 600th anniversary of St Mary's was celebrated in 2005 with a series of special events. In 2012 the church bells, which had been named the worst-sounding in the country, were replaced.

Either before or as a result of the dissolution of the monasteries, Moseley became a manor in its own right, though records of this are not evident. Certainly, Moseley Hall was 'rebuilt' in parkland in the early 1600s by the Grevis family, and rebuilt again by 1795 after being set on fire during rioting in 1791. It was donated in 1891 to the City of Birmingham by Richard Cadbury and now forms part of Moseley Hall Hospital.

Spring Hill College, a Gothic revival construction built in 1857 and now home to Moseley School, is located in the south of the district. Former pupils include comedian Jasper Carrott and musician Bev Bevan of the Electric Light Orchestra.

Moseley local centre is formed around the Victorian shopping precinct known as Moseley Village, which forms part of a historical conservation area. Moseley and the surrounding areas were much developed after 1910, being built upon the once extensive farm land that was predominant in this area. The new properties being mostly of large houses, designed to cater for the Edwardian middle-class families that settled in the suburbs surrounding Birmingham's industrial centre. These large houses relied upon at least one servant or 'tweeny' as they were often termed, to help the lady of the house run the household. With the advent of the First World War, staff were hard to find to maintain houses of this size. The heating bills and high maintenance made them unpopular after the war and many were split into flats to cater for the requirements of the expanding working population who moved from the city centre as extensive redevelopment took place in the 1960s.

Local band Ocean Colour Scene were active in the mid-1990s British Britpop–indie scene with songs such as "The Riverboat Song", inspired by locations within the suburb of Moseley. Their most successful album (in terms of weeks on chart) was Moseley Shoals. Moseley is also the birthplace of Nick Rhodes of Duran Duran.

The politician Joseph Chamberlain had his Birmingham residence at Highbury Hall, near the edge of Moseley. The property was entrusted to the city after Chamberlain's death and since 2016 has been in the care of the Chamberlain Highbury Trust.

== Culture and community ==
The Moseley Community Trust (MCT) invests in the social and physical capital of the area. Established with funding from charitable trust funds and with the support of the Moseley and Kings Heath Ward Committee, the MCT is now managing a series of initiatives to improve the environment of Moseley. The Moseley Society exists to protect the heritage of the area; meetings of the Society discuss and debate a wide range of local issues and the interests of its residents. The Moseley Forum organise a monthly farmers' market.

It has its own monthly magazine, Moseley B13 (formerly Birmingham 13), reporting on local events and personalities. It has been printing as of May 1973.

A group of volunteers have formed Moseley in Bloom (MiB). Much like the Moseley Community Trust, the group undertake many projects which look at the greener issues around Moseley. Many projects take place throughout the year to enhance the landscape of Moseley as well as renovate dilapidated areas.

In the past, Moseley has hosted Moseley Festival in the summer, a festival of arts and culture that saw people in the community come together and hold a series of music, art, food, cultural and sporting events, however this event has been cut due to limited funding and resources.

Moseley Folk and Arts Festival takes place later in the year, and attracts prominent names from the world of folk. Moseley Jazz, Funk & Soul Festival takes place in Moseley Park during the summer as well. Moseley also has its own literary festival, Pow-Wow LitFest, which has taken place annually at the Prince of Wales pub as of 2011.

In 2015 Moseley was named as the "best urban place to live" by The Sunday Times, with the newspaper citing its 'Arts and Crafts', 'Bohemian culture' and 'Victorian Architecture' as reasons to live in the suburb. This award followed its being highlighted by The Guardian in 2013 as a place to move to, with similar reasons being cited.

=== Literature ===
J. R. R. Tolkien spent his early years in Moseley, living close to Sarehole Mill in Hall Green before moving to the site now occupied by Shades Music off the Alcester Road. Sarehole Mill is believed to have been his inspiration for the tranquil Shire in The Lord of the Rings. He also drew inspiration from Moseley Bog for the landscape of Middle-earth.

== Transport ==
Moseley is on the Camp Hill line railway, with three stations serving the area: Pineapple Road, Kings Heath and Moseley Village. There are two trains per hour in each direction between Kings Norton and Birmingham New Street. The line reopened to passengers on 7 April 2026.

Moseley is served by bus routes 1, 1S, 35, 41, 50, and 50A by West Midlands Bus and Diamond Bus (50 and 50A).

== Governance ==
As of 2026, Moseley is represented by two Liberal Democrat councillors on Birmingham City Council: Izzy Knowles and Philip Mills.

Moseley is situated within the parliamentary constituency of Birmingham Hall Green and Moseley, which is represented by Labour MP Tahir Ali.

== Education ==
Moseley has two secondary schools, Moseley School, a language college, and Queensbridge School, an arts college. It also has several primary schools such as Moseley C of E Primary School, a one form entry school that has connections with St. Mary's Church, and Park Hill Primary School on Alcester Road and St Martin de Porres Catholic Primary School.

Moseley is also home to Uffculme School, an all age special school for children on the autism spectrum. It is also home to James Brindley Academy's Willows Centre, which provides education to inpatients at Parkview Clinic.

Fox Hollies School also lies within Moseley.

== Sport ==
Moseley has a rich history of success in Rugby Union. Its most famous team is Moseley Rugby Football Club, who were one of Europe's best teams in the late 1960s to the 1980s. Notable players include Sam Doble, J. F. Byrne, Peter Cranmer, Alain Rolland, Mike Teague and Victor Ubogu.

The Moseley Wanderers team of 1900 won the Silver Medal in the Rugby Union competition at the 1900 Olympics.

== Notable residents ==
Many people who have been born, lived or worked in Moseley have made important contributions, a few of the more high-profile ones are:

- Kabir Ali, Worcestershire & England cricketer
- Edward Bach, doctor, best known for developing a range of remedies called the Bach flower remedies
- Dan Bull, rapper and songwriter
- Ali Campbell, singer in UB40
- Austen Chamberlain MP, statesman, Lord Mayor of Birmingham, philanthropist and Nobel Peace Prize winner
- Neville Chamberlain, Prime Minister, MP and Lord Mayor of Birmingham (declared World War II)
- Carl Chinn, historian, radio presenter, newspaper columnist, and media personality
- Alan Cottrell, metallurgist and physicist
- Fyfe Dangerfield, musician, solo artist and lead singer of the Guillemots
- Archibald John Davies, stained glass artist and founder of the glass studio of the Bromsgrove Guild of Applied Arts
- Roger Jon Ellory, author
- Simon Fowler, musician and lead singer of Ocean Colour Scene
- Dave Haslam, British writer, broadcaster and Haçienda nightclub DJ
- Claudia Jessie, actress
- Trish Keenan, songwriter, musician and lead singer of Broadcast
- Frederick W. Lanchester, pioneer of the motor car
- Joanne Malin, TV presenter, co-presenter of Central Tonight
- Herbert Mason MC, film director, producer, actor, stage manager, choreographer, production manager and army officer in World War I
- Jess Phillips, Member of Parliament for Birmingham Yardley.
- Nick Rhodes, keyboardist in Duran Duran
- Brian Travers, saxophonist in UB40
- J. R. R. Tolkien, author of The Hobbit and The Lord of the Rings

== See also ==
- Moseley Conservation Area
- St Agnes Moseley Conservation Area
