= Highter's Heath =

Electoral ward of Birmingham City Council

Coordinates: 52.404°N 1.879°W

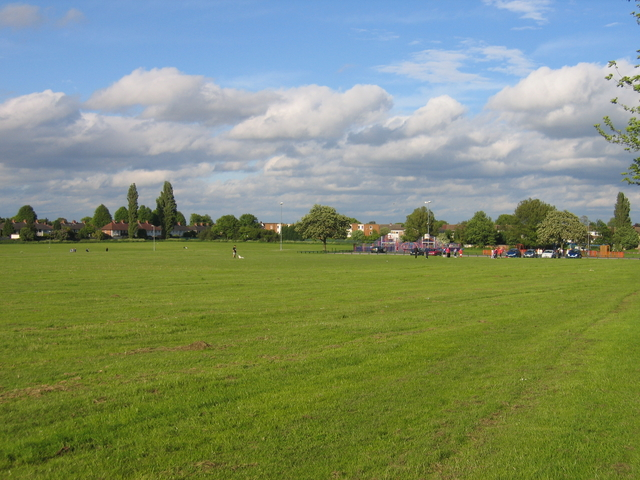
Daisy Farm Park, Highter's Heath

Highter's Heath (often Highters Heath) is a district and ward lying on the southern boundary of the city of Birmingham, UK. The district of Highter's Heath lies immediately east of the Maypole. The first recorded use of the name dates from 1495 as Heyters Heath, however today the name is not one that is particularly in widespread use, indeed only three signposted references to the name exist, when entering the city along Maypole Lane, when entering the city from the bottom of Highters Heath Lane and in Major's Green.

South of Maypole Lane the area is often referred to as Hollywood, after the adjacent village in Worcestershire, whilst to the north the boundary with Warstock (and the wider B14 moniker of Kings Heath) is undefined. The area includes Daisy Farm Park.

Immanuel is the local parish church, behind which is located the local primary school. This is called Hollywood Primary School, so named because not only did the school open well after Highters Heath School, located at the far end of Highters Heath Lane in Warstock, but also because when the school was built in the early 1960s the city boundary still ran along Maypole Lane.

== Transport ==
Maypole Lane is served by National Express West Midlands bus route 49 whilst Alcester Road South is served by bus nos. 664/665 and Glenavon Road is served by bus no. 2. Bus route 50 additionally serves the Maypole.

== Governance ==
Highter's Heath, as part of the reorganisation of local government in Birmingham, was made a single councillor electoral ward in May 2018 and includes Highter's Heath, Warstock, Maypole, and part of Yardley Wood. Adam Higgs of the Conservative Party was elected as the councillor for Highter's Heath on 7 May 2018, a position he retained in the elections of 2022 and 2026. As part of the Birmingham Selly Oak constituency, Highter's Heath is represented in the British Parliament by Alistair Carns of the Labour Party.
