= Hollywood, Worcestershire =

Village in Worcestershire, England

Coordinates: 52.391°N 1.878°W

Hollywood
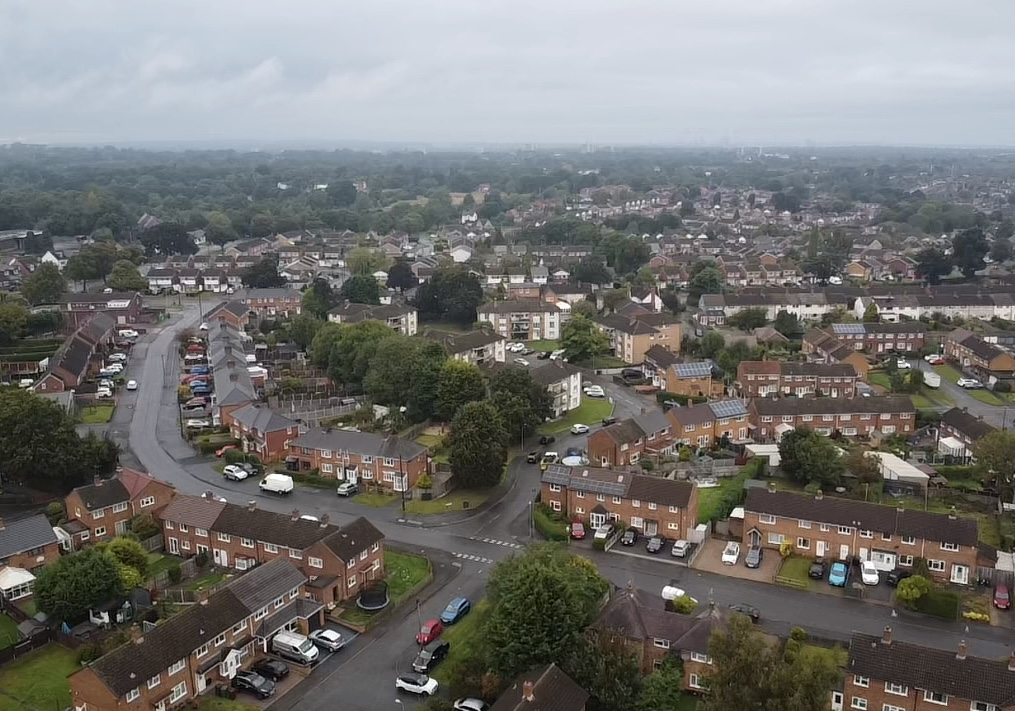
- Simms Lane, The Croft, The Innage

- Location within Worcestershire
- Population: 7,284; Including Silver Street and Packhorse/Baccabox Lane
- OS grid reference: SP081772
- Civil parish: Wythall
- District: Bromsgrove
- Shire county: Worcestershire
- Region: West Midlands
- Country: England
- Sovereign state: United Kingdom
- Post town: BIRMINGHAM
- Postcode district: B47
- Dialling code: 0121 & 01564
- Police: West Mercia
- Fire: Hereford and Worcester
- Ambulance: West Midlands
- UK Parliament: Bromsgrove

Hollywood is a large village predominantly located in the Bromsgrove district of Worcestershire, England, almost contiguous with and to the south of the city of Birmingham. Hollywood was formerly part of Kings Norton, but when Birmingham expanded in 1911, Hollywood remained in Worcestershire. The village now lies across the wards of Hollywood, most of Drakes Cross, the Trueman's Heath polling district area of Trueman's Heath parish ward and, following a 1966 border change, the southern portion of the Birmingham Highter's Heath ward, with all but the latter being located within the civil parish of Wythall. The southern part of the village is also known as Drakes Cross, whilst the eastern part is sometimes referred to as Trueman's Heath. Hollywood is situated in the extreme northeastern corner of Worcestershire, 8.5 miles (13.7 km) south of Birmingham city centre, 6 miles (9.7 km) west of Solihull, and 8 miles (13 km) northeast of Redditch.

== History ==
Until the 1950s, Hollywood was a rural area with many fields and farms. Extensive postwar development saw these fields and farms give way to housing estates, shops and schools. The majority of the development that took place was non-contiguous with the Birmingham conurbation: Hollywood Golf Course in particular ensured a break existed, as well as the retention of open fields directly south of the Maypole. However, in 1966, the city boundary moved from Maypole Lane to incorporate the latest contiguous developments on and directly off Maypole Lane, Alcester Road South and Highters Heath Lane, including the at the time recently built Hollywood Primary School. The naming of the school has primarily contributed to this part of Birmingham's Highter's Heath ward continuing to be associated with Hollywood.

== Geography ==
Hollywood is served by the Alcester Road, although the A435 road itself which formerly ran through the village now bypasses it, and is adjacent to Highter's Heath to the north and Wythall to the south. Other settlements close by include Kings Heath, Kings Norton, Shirley, Maypole, Tidbury Green, Earlswood, Major's Green, Whitlocks End and Dickens Heath.

== Amenities ==
Hollywood is home to the 18-hole Hollywood Golf Club, formerly known as Gay Hill Golf Club since 1913. Most of the village's community buildings are centred around Woodrush High School and the adjacent Coppice Primary School on Shawhurst Lane. These include the Woodrush Sports Centre, Community Hub and Wythall (parish) Library, whilst St Mary's CoE Church, originally located on Chapel Lane in Wythall, now occupies a new building adjoining the Coppice School. Hollywood Primary School is located just over the county border within the Highter's Heath ward of the city of Birmingham, and Meadow Green Primary School to the south, in Wythall village, on Meadow Lane. The Packhorse public house is located on Packhorse Lane, at the junction with Alcester Road, and The White Swan public house on Alcester Road, at the junction with Houndsfield Lane.

== Transport ==
Hollywood is served by multiple bus routes. Diamond run the 150 (between Redditch and Kings Heath), the 50A (between Redditch and Birmingham City Centre) and the 502 (a school service between Kings Heath and Alcester Academy), and LandFlight run the 664/665 (circular, through Wythall, Maypole, Dickens Heath, Shirley, and Solihull). The village is served by two railway stations, being in close proximity to Wythall station and Whitlocks End station, providing half-hourly and hourly trains to Stratford-Upon-Avon, Birmingham, Kidderminster, and Worcester.

== Notable residents ==
- Steve Ashley, former motor racing champion (Class 4 Kart, Formula Ford, F3).
- Alan Dedicoat, former presenter at BBC Radio WM and now 'Voice of the Balls' on The National Lottery Draws, born in the village.
- Chris Dunn (bass guitarist) from the band City Boy
- Leslie Dunn (actor, compere, TV news journalist), known for playing Paul Johnson in The Archers
- Parry Glasspool, Hollyoaks actor.
- Alan Smith, former Arsenal and Leicester City striker.
- John Taylor from the band Duran Duran.
