= Warstock =

Suburb of Birmingham, West Midlands, England

Coordinates: 52.416°N 1.872°W

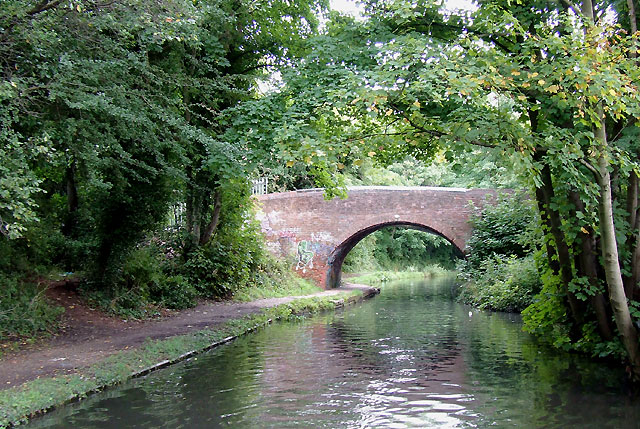
Warstock Lane Bridge, Birmingham

Warstock is a district within the city of Birmingham, UK, in the southernmost suburbs roughly 1 km east of the A435 and within the ward of Highter's Heath. The area lies within the B14 postcode and is contiguous with Yardley Wood to the north-east, Solihull Lodge to the south-east and Highter's Heath to the south-west. Kings Heath lies to the north-west.

The core (i.e. uncontentiously defined area) of the suburb is centred on Daisy Farm Road and is the smallest widely recognised district within Birmingham (map). To the west of the core area some properties favour the wider B14 moniker of Kings Heath whilst the boundary with Highter's Heath is also undefined.

The core area includes the Highters Heath Community (primary) School and is served by National Express West Midlands no. 2 bus route.

The housing in Warstock is mostly terraced and semi-detached, for the most part built in and around the 1930s, to house the result of the first baby boom. Two areas initially developed in the 1950s have since been rebuilt, namely Shorters Avenue and Whitlock Grove / Moundsley Grove.

There are a number of shops sited across two locations on Prince of Wales Lane. Those on the east side of the road (between Grafton Road and High Street), which includes Warstock Post Office, are actually within Solihull MBC, although their postcode remains Birmingham B14.

There were many pubs in and around this area but in recent years all but a few have closed and been demolished. The Bagnall Arms (School Road/Warstock Lane), The Warstock (Prince of Wales Lane/Yardley Wood Road), The Haven (251 School Road, later known as The Mercury), The Valley (Yardley Wood Road/Haunch Lane), and The Maypole (at the Maypole) have all been demolished. The Dog and Partridge (146 Priory Road) still stands but is now used as a church. The nearest surviving pubs are now The Prince of Wales at the southern end of Prince of Wales Lane (closed as of June 2021, and rumoured to be replaced by a nursing home), The Horseshoe on Alcester Road, The Lodge in Solihull Lodge, and DJ Quinns, formerly Behans Bar and originally The Sherwood, on Highfield Road, along with Yardley Wood Social Club at the northern end of Prince of Wales Lane.
