= Walker's Heath =

Area of Birmingham, England

Coordinates: 52.4052°N 1.9144°W

Walker's Heath is a small area spanning the southern border of the city of Birmingham, England (northeastern segment of the Kings Norton South ward) and the Bromsgrove District of Worcestershire (northern-most segment of the Wythall West ward). It is located to the immediate south-east of the Birmingham suburb of Kings Norton.

A Local Government Boundary Commission for England review of 1992 identified the adult population of the Worcestershire part of Walker's Heath as just 400 (since increased to 634); however, despite a recommendation the area be transferred to the city of Birmingham, such a change did not come to effect. As a result, Walker's Heath continues to share a commonality with Rubery, a larger suburb located a few miles west, in being a contiguous built-up area spanning the Birmingham-Worcestershire border.

A notable feature of the area is Walkers Heath Park.

Walker's Heath is served by National Express West Midlands bus route 35 to Birmingham via Kings Heath and 49 Solihull to Rubery via Kings Norton.
