= Maypole Comprehensive School =

Location
- 501 Bell's Lane, Druids Heath, West Midlands, B14 5TL; Birmingham

Information
- Established: September 1969
- Closed: July 1983
- Local authority: Birmingham
- Age range: 11-18
- Education system: Comprehensive
- Campus: Urban

Maypole Comprehensive School was a mixed, purpose built comprehensive school built between 1969 and 1971 in Birmingham, West Midlands, England. It was located on the southern edge of Birmingham near The Maypole in the outer city ward of Druids Heath. The school was designed to house 1,000 pupils and had facilities for gymnasia, science and language laboratories, music and other specialist rooms. Due to a reorganisation of schools in Birmingham, it merged with another mixed entry comprehensive to become Baverstock School in 1983.

== Founding and construction ==
It was one of a number of new building projects authorised in 1969, at a time of national teacher unrest and strikes. The school was to offer 354 places and cost £334,635 to build. It was built in four phases, the first was ready to open in 1969 but construction was delayed as a consequence of the (Conservative) Birmingham Education Authority's conflict with the Labour Government about the preservation of Grammar Schools under the plan for nationwide comprehensive (non-selective) education. Until this was resolved, the government refused to release funding for new secondary schools on the Comprehensive model.

== Feeder Schools ==
The catchment area system divided Birmingham into zones, and children could only apply for a place in schools, within that zone, although the local authority could assign a child out of zone if there was a shortage of local places. This system was abolished with the Greenwich judgement.

== Expansion and closure ==
In 1972, a new classroom due to open in September was held back by a building worker's strike, resulting in a half day rota for the 750 pupils. In 1975 the building of three portable classrooms was frozen 'because of economies', forcing the school to use classrooms at Grendon Primary School.

In 1981 a shake-up of school organisation in Birmingham was announced, in part due to financial stresses, but also to a declining birth rate affecting secondary school entries. One aspect of the re-organisation was the decision, in the face of declining rolls, to move most Sixth form education to Further education colleges.

It was announced that Maypole School would merge with the only other mixed entry comprehensive in the catchment area, Brandwood, to become Baverstock School.

== Head Teachers ==
1970 - Mr. A. E Walker.

1975-1983 Miss B. C. Bonham
