= West Midlands Bus route 50 =

Bus route in Birmingham, England

50

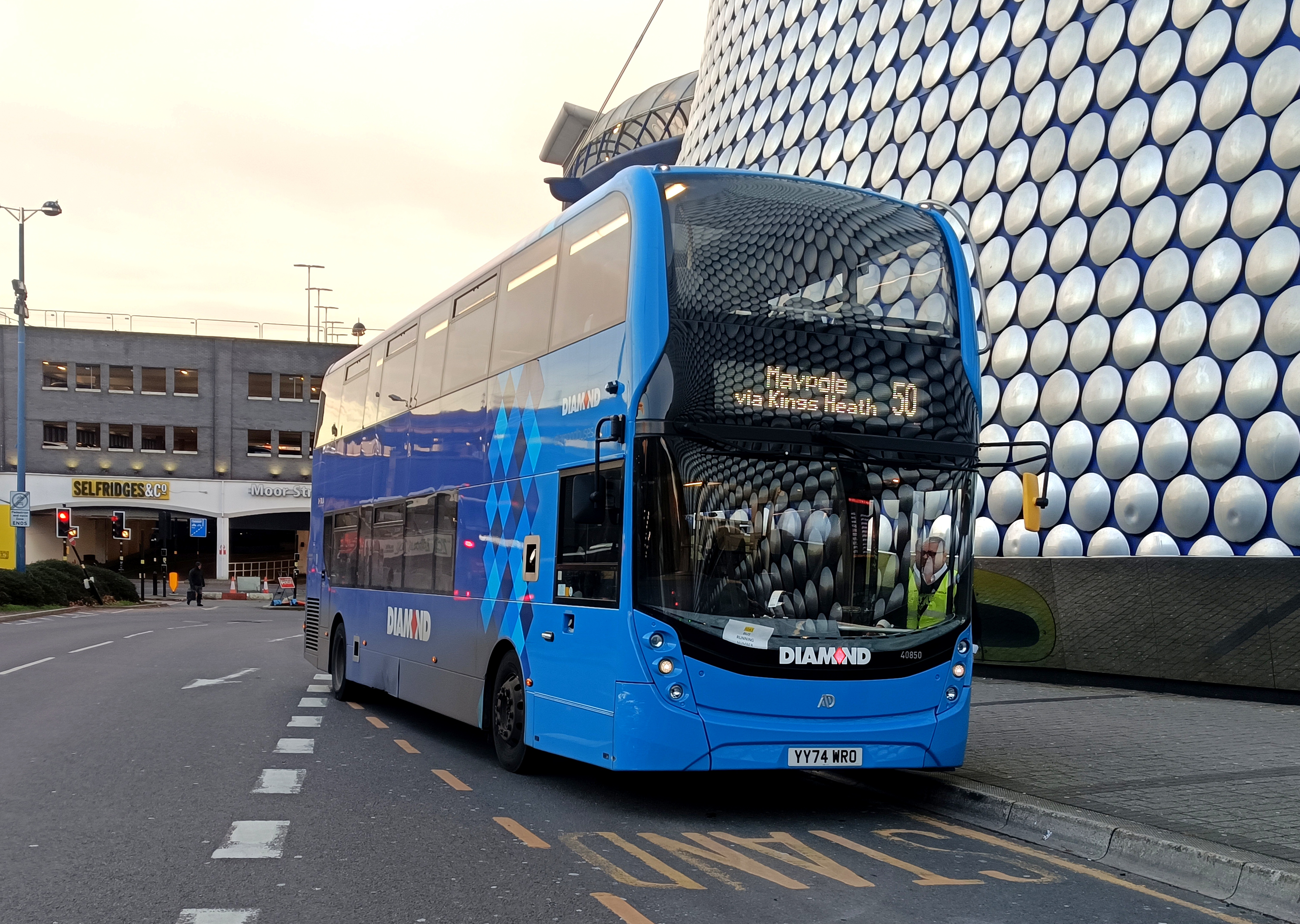
- Diamond West Midlands Alexander Dennis Enviro400 MMC operating route 50 on Moor Street in November 2025

Overview
- Operator: Diamond West Midlands; West Midlands Bus
- Garage: Yardley Wood (NXWM); Redditch (Diamond)
- Vehicle: Alexander Dennis Enviro400 MMC; BYD D8UR-DD ADL Enviro400 EV (NXWM); Wright StreetDeck (Diamond)

Route
- Start: Druids Heath (NXWM); Maypole (Diamond); Redditch Bus Station (Diamond 50A)
- Via: Kings Heath; Moseley; Balsall Heath
- End: Birmingham, Moor Street Queensway

West Midlands Bus route 50 operates in Birmingham, England. It operates from Central Birmingham to Druids Heath via Moseley, Kings Heath and Maypole along Alcester Road, it is one of the busiest bus routes in Europe. Route 50 was introduced in 1949 and is currently opearted by Diamond West Midlands and West Midlands Bus.

== History ==
Route 50 was introduced by Birmingham City Transport between the City Centre and Maypole in October 1949 to replace a withdrawn tram route. It was supplemented by route 49 which ran as far as Moseley or Kings Heath (via Leopold Street rather than Bradford Street) and route 48 which ran Gooch Street, Clevedon Road and Salisbury Road to Moseley then Alcester Road to the Maypole. The latter was extended to the new Druids Heath estate in July 1966.

Route 49 ceased in May 1975 when West Midlands Passenger Transport Executive linked it to route 35, the new service adopting the latter number whilst being also further extended to Pool Farm (the 35 previously ran Kings Heath to Brandwood only). In the 1980s, route 48 was also withdrawn with route 35 instead covering the Gooch St / Salisbury Rd section and route 50 extended to Druids Heath.

Following deregulation Your Bus additionally operated on the route numbered 50Y before they were taken over by the successor to WMPTE operations, West Midlands Travel in 1993 who continued to run 50Y services until their Travel Your Bus subsidiary until as late as 2001.

In 1998, route 50 became the first Travel West Midlands route to be operated using low-floor double-deck buses, however the first low-floor double-deck journey in the United Kingdom was operated a few hours prior by Abus. The Optare Spectra buses bought specifically for the route were replaced by Alexander ALX400 bodied Volvo B7TLs in February 2001. It celebrated its 50th anniversary later in the same year.

People's Express operated a rival service before being taken over by Diamond Bus; Diamond continue to operate on the route. In October 2006, Sunrise Travel commenced operating services on route 50, but withdrew the service a couple of months later. The Green Bus also competed on the route in 2013 and 2014, but withdrew their service on the route in December 2014.

National Express West Midlands commenced operating a 24-hour service on the route on 20 July 2014. New Alexander Dennis Enviro400 were introduced on route 50 in February 2008, replacing Alexander ALX400 bodied Dennis Trident 2s.

Route 50 is claimed by National Express to be one of the busiest routes in Europe. This, however has been disputed, with some claiming that the Greater Manchester bus route 192 is more frequent.

In early 2015, route 50 received new Alexander Dennis Enviro400 MMC buses. In late 2018, the route was upgraded to the Platinum specification buses.

It is proposed by Network West Midlands that the 50 is converted to a cross city service, to be merged with a Dudley - Birmingham via Cape Hill service.
