= Travel Your Bus =

British bus operating company

- Parent: National Express Group
- Ceased operation: 2001
- Headquarters: Alcester
- Service area: West Midlands
- Service type: Bus services

Travel Your Bus was a bus operator in the West Midlands. It was a subsidiary of West Midlands Travel.

== History ==
The Your Bus network of bus services started on 30 November 1987 when route 50Y was introduced by Smiths Coaches. This ran every 20 minutes in competition with West Midlands Travel's route 50 between Druids Heath and Birmingham City Centre via Alcester Road using second-hand Daimler Fleetline double deck buses purchased from Greater Manchester Buses. The company adopted the orange, brown and white livery these vehicles arrived in as their fleet colours for the bus operation and uniquely added a Y to the end of all its bus service numbers. To get buses to and from the West Midlands and Alcester the company introduced placing journeys, initially just at peak times, which ran the most direct way via the A435 thus bypassing Redditch.

On 3 September 1988, a peak hour route 51Y of three journeys each way was introduced that diverted via Redditch New Town when it ran between Alcester and Birmingham. This service was withdrawn on 13 January 1992.

The company also introduced route 47Y on 31 October 1988, which was also a way of getting buses to and from the West Midlands, running via Redditch New Town, West Heath and the Pershore Road into Birmingham. This service was renumbered 45Y on 28 October 1989 and was withdrawn on 13 January 1992, bringing to an end the brief operation of Your Bus in Redditch. Your Bus continued to develop services in south Birmingham and Solihull over the next few years and invested heavily in new single deck vehicles. By 1990, it operated 40 buses.

=== West Midlands Travel Takeover ===
During 1993, Your Bus was taken over by West Midlands Travel who continued to run it as a separate subsidiary, adopting the branding Travel Your Bus in September 1996. The operating centre was soon moved to Miller Street in Birmingham where the coaching interests of West Midlands Travel under the Central Coachways trading name were absorbed. In 1995, West Midlands Travel was taken over itself by National Express.

=== Rebranded Travel West Midlands ===
On 4 February 2001, following a group restructuring the Travel Your Bus services were absorbed into the main company's West Midlands bus operation which by this time was trading as Travel West Midlands (and now trades as National Express West Midlands), ending the Your Bus operation. The Central Coachways name and some contract work was sold to Flights Coaches.

=== Photos ===
- Your Bus service 50Y
- Your Bus (WMT) service 2Y
- Travel Your Bus service 53Y
