= Wythall =

Village and civil parish in Bromsgrove, England

Coordinates: 52.374°N 1.886°W

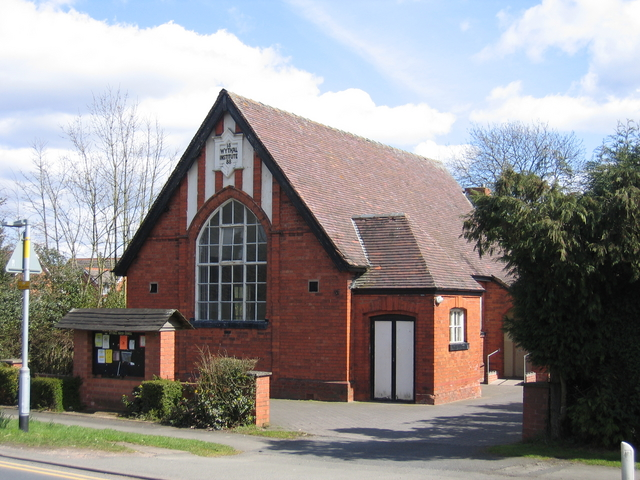
- Wythall Institute

- Location within Worcestershire
- Population: 12,269
- Civil parish: Wythall
- District: Bromsgrove
- Shire county: Worcestershire
- Region: West Midlands
- Country: England
- Sovereign state: United Kingdom
- Post town: Birmingham
- Postcode district: B47
- Dialling code: 01564
- Police: West Mercia
- Fire: Hereford and Worcester
- Ambulance: West Midlands
- UK Parliament: Bromsgrove

Wythall is a large village and civil parish in the Bromsgrove district, in the northeastern corner of the county of Worcestershire, England. Wythall parish borders Solihull and Birmingham, and had a population of 12,269 in the UK census of 2021.

== History ==
The civil parish was created in 1911 when the remainder of the previous King's Norton civil parish was absorbed into the then County Borough of Birmingham.

== Geography ==
Wythall village is around 7 miles south of Birmingham City Centre (a 20-minute train journey from Wythall railway station) along Alcester Road. There are a number of 19th century buildings on this road including the Wythall Institute (erected 1888/89). The civil parish of Wythall has always included Drake's Cross, Hollywood and Headley Heath and today also includes Major's Green and the formerly undeveloped Worcestershire part of Walker's Heath. Wythall village itself is generally the area covered by the parish ward of Grimes Hill and the northeastern portion of the Wythall Heath parish ward, combined population 2,080, although the Silver Street and Chapel Lane areas are also usually included (the remainder of the Wythall Heath parish ward additionally includes the subsidiary settlements of Inkford and Tanner's Green along with the Kings Norton Golf Course). The easternmost section of Wythall village, around the railway station, was traditionally referred to as Grimes Hill.

== Religion ==
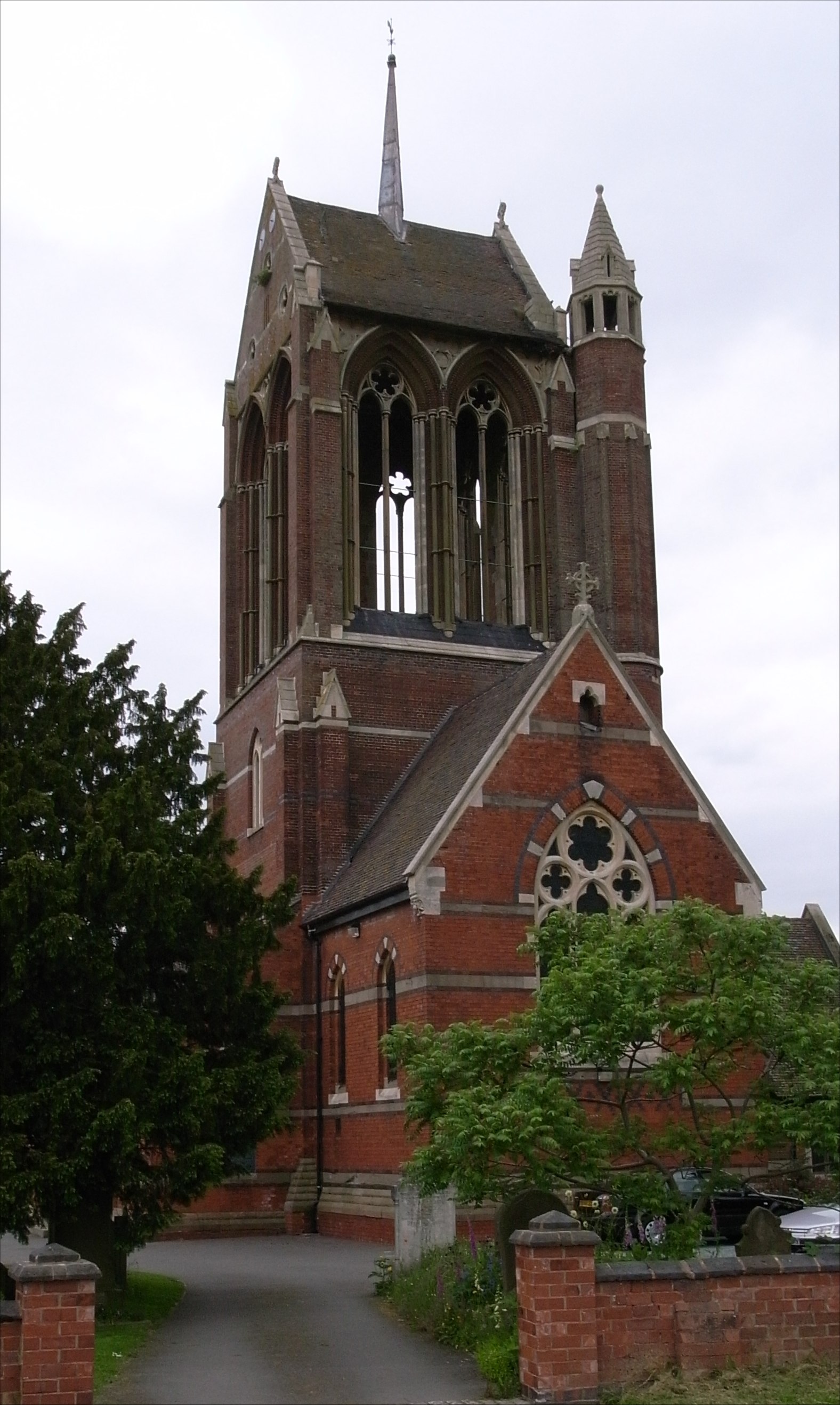
St Mary's Church, now redundant

Wythall's former parish church, St Mary's, stands to the south-west of Wythall and Hollywood villages. The Anglican church was built in 1862, and has a roof and stair turret added by W.H. Bidlake. It closed for worship in 1986 and is now a Grade II listed building in private ownership.

Three churches are active in the parish today. Kingswood Meeting House on Packhorse Lane, Hollywood, is a Unitarian chapel. Its congregation's first meeting house, built around 1708, was damaged in the Sacheverell riots of 1715; the present building dates from 1793, was remodelled between about 1860 and 1874, and is Grade II listed. The Church of England congregation of St Mary's now meets in a church building behind the Coppice Primary School on Shawhurst Lane, Hollywood. Hollywood Christian Life Centre, an independent evangelical church affiliated to the Fellowship of Independent Evangelical Churches, is based on Simms Lane, Hollywood, and has also held gatherings at Meadow Green School in Wythall.

At the 2021 census, 57.5% of the parish's residents described themselves as Christian and 32.6% as having no religion, compared with 46.2% and 37.2% across England and Wales.

== Education ==
There are two primary schools within Wythall parish, the Coppice Primary School in Hollywood and Meadow Green Primary School in Wythall village. There was previously a school in Silver Street from circa 1875 to 1992 which for many years catered for all primary aged school children in Wythall and the surrounding area, until a growing population required more school development. Woodrush High School in Hollywood opened in 1957 for children aged 11 and over, and Shawhurst Infants School (next door to Woodrush) opened around 1967, leaving what was by now called Silvermead School as a junior school. Meadow Green School opened in September 1965 to give additional junior and infant provision. During 1991–92 an extension was built on Shawhurst Infants School, and its development became the Coppice Primary School. The Silvermead site was then closed, although many of its buildings have been converted into homes as Silvermead Court. The Coppice Primary School became an academy in December 2011.

Until 2002 a private school, Innisfree House, existed in Station Road. Its original purpose was the education of the children of officers of the RAF station (see below), and in the years after the Second World War it was attended by the young Bruce Chatwin.

== RAF Wythall ==
From 1939 to 1959 Wythall was home to a Royal Air Force station, initially housing a barrage balloon facility, and latterly, 1952–57, a Joint Services School of Applied Linguistics, training men from the RN and RAF in Russian military terminology and the use of radios for Signals Intelligence purposes; additionally, Chinese, Czech, German and Polish were taught to small numbers of RAF men. Part of the site is now occupied by the Transport Museum, Chapel Lane, which has a collection of historic buses and battery electric vehicles.

== Economy ==
The parish's built-up areas of Wythall, Hollywood, Drakes Cross and Major's Green are surrounded by land in the West Midlands Green Belt. Local shops are concentrated in two small parades in Hollywood and along Station Road in Wythall, and the area also has three golf courses.

Becketts Farm on Alcester Road began as a small family dairy farm. Its first farm shop opened in the 1960s, selling eggs from the garage of the original farmhouse, and the business has since grown to include a farm shop, restaurant, conference facilities, a cookery school and commercial lettings, employing over 120 people.

Davies Timber, a timber merchant based at Wythall Saw Mills on Alcester Road, was founded over 100 years ago by Jack Davies and remains on its original site.

== Transport ==
Hourly West Midlands Railway services are run between Stratford-Upon-Avon and Kidderminster, through Wythall Station and Earlswood, and hourly to and from Worcester Foregate Street terminating at Whitlocks End Station, one stop short of Wythall. The village is linked to Redditch and Kings Heath by Diamond Bus service 150 and hourly Landflight services 664/665 to and from Solihull, both operating Mon-Sat.
