= Walkers Heath Park =

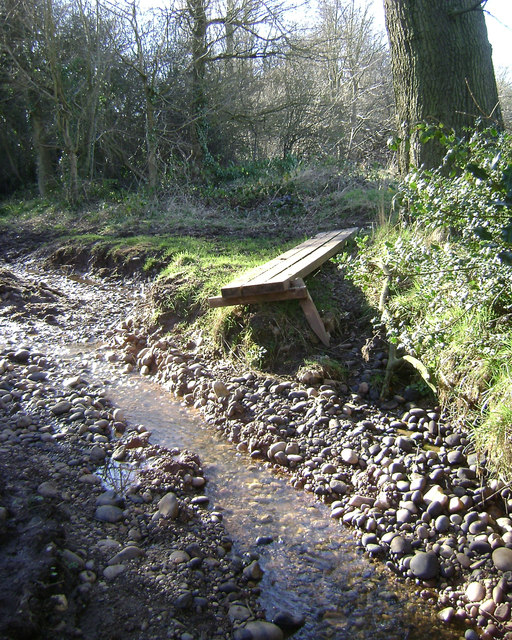
- Interactive map of Walkers Heath Park
- Location: Birmingham, England
- Coordinates: 52.401751°N 1.912222°W
- Operator: Birmingham City Council

Walkers Heath Park is a park in Walker's Heath, south-west Birmingham that covers approximately 21 hectares (52 acres) nestled between the estates of Kings Norton and Druids Heath. The site was originally Headley Fields Farm.

The park has a basketball court, netball court and a tennis court with permanent tennis net as well as two sets of kickabout goals. There's also a concrete table-tennis table.

The park is unusual in that it is managed by one local authority, Birmingham, but is located within and the land owned by a second, Bromsgrove District.

The Friends of Walkers Heath Park have organized volunteer efforts aimed at improving the park's grounds and facilities. Together with Catch22 and The National Trust, The Friends of Walkers Heath Park have planted new trees, added new seating and bins, cleaned out Chinn Brook that runs through the park, and laid new hedges. A "Community Games" were held on the grounds to encourage local residents to use the renovated facilities. Several areas of the park are suitable for bicycling, including mountain biking.

== Partnerships ==
- Partnership with Birmingham City Council - Active Parks Pilot.

The 'Leisure Centres Without Walls' a.k.a. 'Active Parks' the pilot project is as follows: - a pilot project in 3 parks across the city of which Walkers Heath Park is one, where Birmingham City Council Sport and Parks teams are working with the Friends of Parks groups to deliver activities in parks and open spaces. The programme will include a range of sports and other activities for families, groups, and individuals and will be run by staff and volunteers. If successful, it is hoped that they can launch the initiative across the city.
