= Wheelers Lane Technology College =

Coordinates: 52.4285°N 1.8878°W

Location
- Wheelers Lane; Kings Heath; Birmingham, West Midlands, B13 0SF; England

Information
- Type: Community school
- Local authority: Birmingham City Council
- Department for Education URN: 103501 Tables
- Ofsted: Reports
- Headteacher: Scott Wheeldon
- Gender: Boys
- Age: 11 to 16
- Enrolment: 652 as of March 2022
- Capacity: 650 as of March 2022
- Website: wheelerslane.bham.sch?uk

Wheelers Lane Technology College (formerly Wheelers Lane Boys' School) is a secondary school for boys located in the Kings Heath area of Birmingham, in the West Midlands of England.

It is a non-selective community school administered by Birmingham City Council. The school also has previously been awarded specialist status as a Technology College.

Wheelers Lane Technology College offers GCSEs and BTECs as programmes of study for pupils.

== Notable alumni ==
- James O'Connor (born 1984), footballer
- Ian Westwood (born 1982), cricketer
