= The Baverstock Academy =

Location
- 501 Bells Lane; Druids Heath, West Midlands, B14 5TL; England; 52.4050°N 1.8913°W

Information
- Type: Academy
- Motto: Strive to Succeed
- Established: 1983
- Founder: Roger Perks OBE
- Closed: 2017
- Local authority: Birmingham
- Department for Education URN: 139738 Tables
- Ofsted: Reports
- Chair of Governors: Jordan Keen
- Gender: Mixed
- Age: 11 to 18
- Enrolment: 460 at last inspection (April 2017)
- Colours: Yellow, navy blue and black
- Website: www.baverstockacademy.co.uk

The Baverstock Academy (formerly Baverstock Foundation School and Specialist Sports College) was a mixed secondary school and sixth form college, located on the southern edge of the Birmingham outer city ward of Druids Heath.

Due to its outstanding sports facilities, it became one of the first to gain Specialist Sports College status in September 2002 before the Specialist Schools initiative was discontinued but then became a member of the Specialist Schools Trust. Baverstock also held Artsmark Gold, Schools Achievement, and Sportsmark awards. With many past students representing Great Britain in many sporting competitions. The school was also a TEEP Training School and part of the National Literacy Trust programme.

The school was placed in special measures after an "inadequate" inspection result in September 2014. An inspection in February 2016 concluded that special measures should continue, although Ofsted, in June 2016, stated the school was 'substantially' making improvements to the removal of special measures status. The academy was awarded The Good Schools Guide accreditation in 2016 for better performance by Boys taking Engineering at GCSE level than at any other Comprehensive School in England.

The school closed in 2017 and was demolished in November 2020.

== History ==
Baverstock was formed in 1983 during a citywide reorganisation of education. It was a merger of Brandwood School, which had been identified for closure for some time, with Maypole Comprehensive on the site of Maypole School which was built in four phases opening in 1969 and completed by1971. The school crest is the combination of the schools that merged to form Baverstock, with the sabre and shield coming from Brandwood School and the motto Strive to Succeed suggested by students at the school.

The then headteacher, Mr Roger Perks, started with a newly formed school but only 26 applicants for 150 places in the first year's intake.

The school was known for doing things very differently. Mr Perks focused on the pressures the students were facing in their social and family life, which led to programmes like a breakfast club, which was seen as radical in the early 1980s (and which he had first used at Ladywood School a decade before). To show his pride in the school and to set an example to the students, Mr Perks wore the school uniform. Past students will remember the Golden Key award. This was used to illustrate that education was the key to bring change, opportunity and success.

1988 saw the school become grant-maintained, one of the first to take this new status. This allowed the school to heavily invest in new buildings and sports facilities within the school site to cater for the rapidly expanding student population, and the creation of the Sixth Form College in 1996. After having been a grant-maintained school for many years, Baverstock became a Foundation School in 1998 after the abolition of the grant-maintained programme. This brought the school under local education authority control again.

In September 2002, the school was granted Sports College status and became known as Baverstock Foundation School and Specialist Sports College. The school received recognition from 10 Downing Street, the home of the Prime Minister, for its provisions and investment in physical education as one of the nation's top sports colleges. A sports school partnership was formed to work with many local primary schools to raise standards in physical education sports.

Roger Perks retired in April 2002 and David Green became headteacher.

In 2010, plans were announced to merge Baverstock School with Kings Norton High School to form a new 1,000-pupil school. Although a Statement of Intent was signed by Michael Gove, then Secretary of State for Education, this was later withdrawn.

On the departure of David Green as headteacher in 2010, the school was achieving its best ever GCSE results. The replacement for Mr Green was Mr. Thomas Marshall.

The school converted to academy status on 1 June 2013, ceasing to be a state comprehensive school. It was run by the LEAP Academy Trust, with admissions still dealt with by Birmingham City Council.

On 30 June 2016, LEAP Academy Trust announced plans to close the school within the next twelve months, subject to approval by the Secretary of State for Education. The reason given was the failure to find a financial sponsor. Campaigners started a petition against the closure.

== Headteachers ==
=== Roger Perks O.B.E ===
Charles Roger Perks, known as Roger Perks, joined Maypole High School from Naseby School, where he had previously been headteacher. Perks took the role of the headteacher in 1983 when the merger between Maypole High School and Brandwood School led to the formation of Baverstock School. Within five years, Baverstock was regarded as one of Birmingham's most successful inner-city schools. Perks was awarded an O.B.E for services to education in 1991. He retired in 2002 after 19 years of service to the school, and died on Christmas Day in 2004. The students of Baverstock School raised a large amount of money (by means of a concert) for a memorial to him.

=== David Green ===
David Green joined the school in late 2002 and left it at the end of the Summer term 2010. He has now become the chair to the governors of Kings Norton Girls' School.

=== Thomas Marshall ===
Thomas Marshall took the position of headteacher in the September 2010 term. On 1 June 2013, Baverstock Foundation School and Specialist Sports College became The Baverstock Academy, with Mr Thomas Marshall as executive principal of the academy trust.

The school was rated as inadequate by Ofsted in 2014 and then placed into special measures. In November 2015, the school was investigated by the Department for Education for a what was seen as a "concern" over "irregularity" within the school's finances. The investigation came to the conclusion of "serious allegations of financial irregularity and governance" at the school between August and September and sought improvement by December 2015. This led to the removal of Mr Marshall from his post in December 2015. On 1 November 2016, Thomas Marshall finally resigned from the board of the trust, finally ending his position at the Academy.

Marshall was prohibited from teaching indefinitely and could not teach in any school, sixth form college, relevant youth accommodation, or children's home in England. He was able to apply for the prohibition order to be set aside, but not until 4 March 2021 - two years from the date of the order - at the earliest.

In July 2020, under section 128 of the Education and Skills Act 2008, the education secretary Gavin Williamson gave a direction prohibiting a person from taking part in the management of an independent school on prescribed grounds connected with the person's suitability. The banning order meant that Marshall was not allowed to hold management roles in schools, even if his teaching ban was rescinded.

=== Sylvia Thomas ===
Sylvia Thomas, interim executive principal from December 2015 to June 2016. Sylvia left Baverstock for a new principal position in Oxfordshire at Wykham Park Academy.

=== Peter Cox ===
Peter Cox became interim principal in June 2016. From January 2017, he became CEO of The Leap Academy Trust. In February, a letter was leaked to the BBC, dated November 2016 and addressed to the Lord Nash. This was clear he was pushing for closure of the academy and was a clear breach of his role as interim principal and CEO, where he was employed by the DFE to remain impartial and stabilise the academy. Upon the news, the campaign group pushed for his resignation, which they achieved in March 2017. He is a lead inspector for the Independent Schools Inspectorate and an education adviser for the Department of Education's Academy Performance and Brokerage Division, vice principal of a multi-Academy trust in the North East of England working across their two secondary academies, three primary academies, and a studio school.

== Sixth form ==
Baverstock's sixth form was part of the master plan set out by then head teacher Roger Perks, to secure the future success of the school within the community. It was officially opened in 1996 by the then Prime Minister, John Major.

On 5 February 2016, the governing body of the school announced the suspending of the Sixth Form for the 2016–2017 academic year. The reasons given were that the school could no longer give students the right "quality of educational experience" and needed to focus academic concentration on the main school as a priority.

== LEAP programme ==
LEAP (Learn, engage, Achieve and Progress) was a behaviour support centre that was designed to help with exclusions at the school, which had traditionally been very high.

Its purpose was to support students with behaviour issues and to ultimately reduce the exclusion rate. LEAP put the emphasis on learning. The centre was, initially, very labour-intensive with money being spent on providing a new self-contained area from the rest of the main school to put focus on the students. The success of LEAP has been recognised nationally. In 2013–14, 100% of the students who attended the Baverstock Academy achieved the top GCSE grades. LEAP students sit GCSEs and achieve well.

In August 2014, LEAP was the subject of a BBC Panorama programme Last Chance Academy, which highlighted the school's success with disruptive students.

== Notable former pupils ==
- David Avery, television and theatre actor.
- Simon Black, footballer, Birmingham City F.C and Doncaster Rovers F.C.
- Matthew Cox, rugby union player, also for England's national sevens team
- Farah Mendlesohn, historian and science fiction critic, and Hugo Award winner (2005). (Entered Maypole school, 1980).
- Corey O'Keeffe, footballer, Birmingham City, and U17's player for Republic of Ireland
- Jack Storer, footballer, Birmingham City
- Adam Zindani, guitarist with the Stereophonics
