= Kings Heath Secondary School =

Location
- Chamberlain Road; Birmingham, West Midlands, B13 0QP; England
- Coordinates: 52.4237°N 1.8798°W

Information
- Type: Community school
- Local authority: Birmingham
- Department for Education URN: 103486 Tables
- Ofsted: Reports
- Head teacher: Marie Orton
- Gender: Mixed
- Age: 11 to 16
- Enrolment: 792 as of September 2024
- Capacity: 806
- Colours: Navy Blue , Sky Blue , Gold , White
- Website: www.khss.org.uk

Kings Heath Secondary (formerly Kings Heath Boys) is a community school located in Kings Heath, south Birmingham, England. It has a comprehensive admissions policy, and in 2024, had an enrolment of 792 pupils ages 11–16. The current headteacher is Mrs Marie Orton.

== History ==
In May 2023, the school received a rating of "good" from Ofsted, maintaining its rating of "Good" from the previous short-inspection in 2022. The report concluded that "Pupils are happy and considerate at Kings Heath..." and "Leaders have constructed a broad and ambitious curriculum. This has inspired subject leaders to skilfully design subject curriculums."

In July 2023, following consultation, the school announced the decision to become a co-educational (boys and girls) school beginning in September 2024. Improvement works were completed in September 2023 to add the necessary facilities to welcome girls into the school and enhance facilities across the board.

Kings Heath Secondary is a Trauma Informed Attachment Aware School (TIAAS) and has been awarded the Silver TIAAS certification.

In 2023, the school's Arts programme was recognised with a Silver ArtsMark award.
