= Frank Bowden (footballer) =

English footballer (1904–c.1934)

Personal information
- Full name: Frederick Bowden
- Date of birth: November 1904
- Place of birth: Birmingham, England
- Position: Outside left

Senior career*
Years	Team	Apps	(Gls)
- Darwen (Shirebrook)
1925–1927	Birmingham	1	(0)
- Kidderminster Harriers
- Stourbridge
1928–1929	West Ham United	0	(0)
1929–1932	Coventry City	38	(8)
1932–1933	Kidderminster Harriers		
1933–1934	Chesterfield	0	(0)
1934–1935	Coventry City	0	(0)
1935–1936	West Ham United	0	(0)
- * Club domestic league appearances and goals

Frederick Bowden (November 1904 – after 1934), generally known as Frank Bowden, was an English professional footballer who played in the Football League for Birmingham and Coventry City.

== Early life and career ==
Bowden was born in the Kings Heath district of Birmingham. A pacy winger, he made his debut for Birmingham in the First Division on 26 December 1925 in a 2–1 defeat away at Tottenham Hotspur. This turned out to be his only first-team appearance for the club, and he moved into non-league football in the Midlands. Bowden then spent time on West Ham United's books, without appearing in the Football League side, and joined Coventry City, for whom he played 38 times in the Third Division South and scored eight goals. He later signed for Chesterfield and for second spells with Coventry and West Ham, but played no more league football.
