= Turbulence (2011 film) =

2011 British film

Turbulence is a 2011 British film directed by Michael B. Clifford.

It tells the story of a struggling pub and a local rock band. The film was shot in the Kings Heath area of Birmingham.
