= Tommy Green (footballer, born 1873) =

English footballer

Personal information
- Full name: Thomas Green
- Date of birth: 14 July 1873
- Place of birth: Kings Heath, Birmingham, England
- Date of death: 4 October 1921 (aged 48)
- Place of death: Worcester, England
- Position: Inside forward

Senior career*
Years	Team	Apps	(Gls)
1892–1894	Coles Farm Unity		
1894–1896	West Bromwich Albion	8	(2)
1896–1902	Small Heath	0	(0)
1902–1906	Oldbury Town		
- * Club domestic league appearances and goals

Thomas Green (14 July 1873 – 4 October 1921) was an English footballer who played as an inside forward. He attended Vicarage Road School in Birmingham and joined Coles Farm Unity in 1892. He signed for West Bromwich Albion in May 1894 and made his debut against Small Heath in February 1895. After scoring two goals in eight appearances for Albion (all in the league), Green moved to Small Heath in June 1896. He also played for Oldbury Town between May 1902 and May 1906. Green later became a licensee and died in Worcester on 4 October 1921.
