= Dave Linney =

English footballer (born 1961)

Personal information
- Full name: David William Linney
- Date of birth: 5 September 1961 (age 65)
- Place of birth: Birmingham, England
- Position: Midfielder

Youth career
- 1977–1979: Birmingham City

Senior career*
Years	Team	Apps	(Gls)
1979–1982	Birmingham City	1	(0)
1982–1983	Oxford United	26	(0)
1983–1988	Yeovil Town		
1988–19??	Basingstoke Town		
–	Weymouth		
–	Chard Town		
- * Club domestic league appearances and goals

David William Linney (born 5 September 1961) is an English former professional footballer who played in the Football League for Birmingham City and Oxford United.

== Career ==
Linney was born in the Kings Heath district of Birmingham. He began his football career as an apprentice with Birmingham City in 1977, and turned professional two years later. A useful reserve team player, Linney appeared only once for Birmingham's first team, as substitute for Neil Whatmore in the 2–1 First Division win at home to Stoke City on 13 March 1982, shortly after Ron Saunders had taken over from Jim Smith as manager. Released when Saunders reduced the size of the squad, Linney rejoined Smith at Oxford United, where he played 37 games in all competitions in the 1982–83 season, of which 26 were in the Third Division.

Linney joined Yeovil Town, then playing in the Alliance Premier League, in 1983. At the end of the 1983–84 season, Yeovil's supporters' club voted him their Player of the Year. Yeovil were relegated the next season to the Isthmian League Premier Division, after which Linney contributed to two consecutive runners-up spots before they finally won the Isthmian League title and promotion back to the top level of non-league football in 1987–88. Linney left the following season to join Basingstoke Town, and went on to play for Weymouth and Chard Town. In recognition of his five years' service, Yeovil awarded him a testimonial match, against Bristol City at the end of the 1988–89 season.

He went on to work in the commercial department at Yeovil Town F.C., and in 2002 succeeded Alan Skirton as the club's commercial manager, a post he held along with the role of match day announcer until December 2019.
