= Solihull Lodge =

Suburb in Solihull, West Midlands, England

Coordinates: 52.408°N 1.837°W

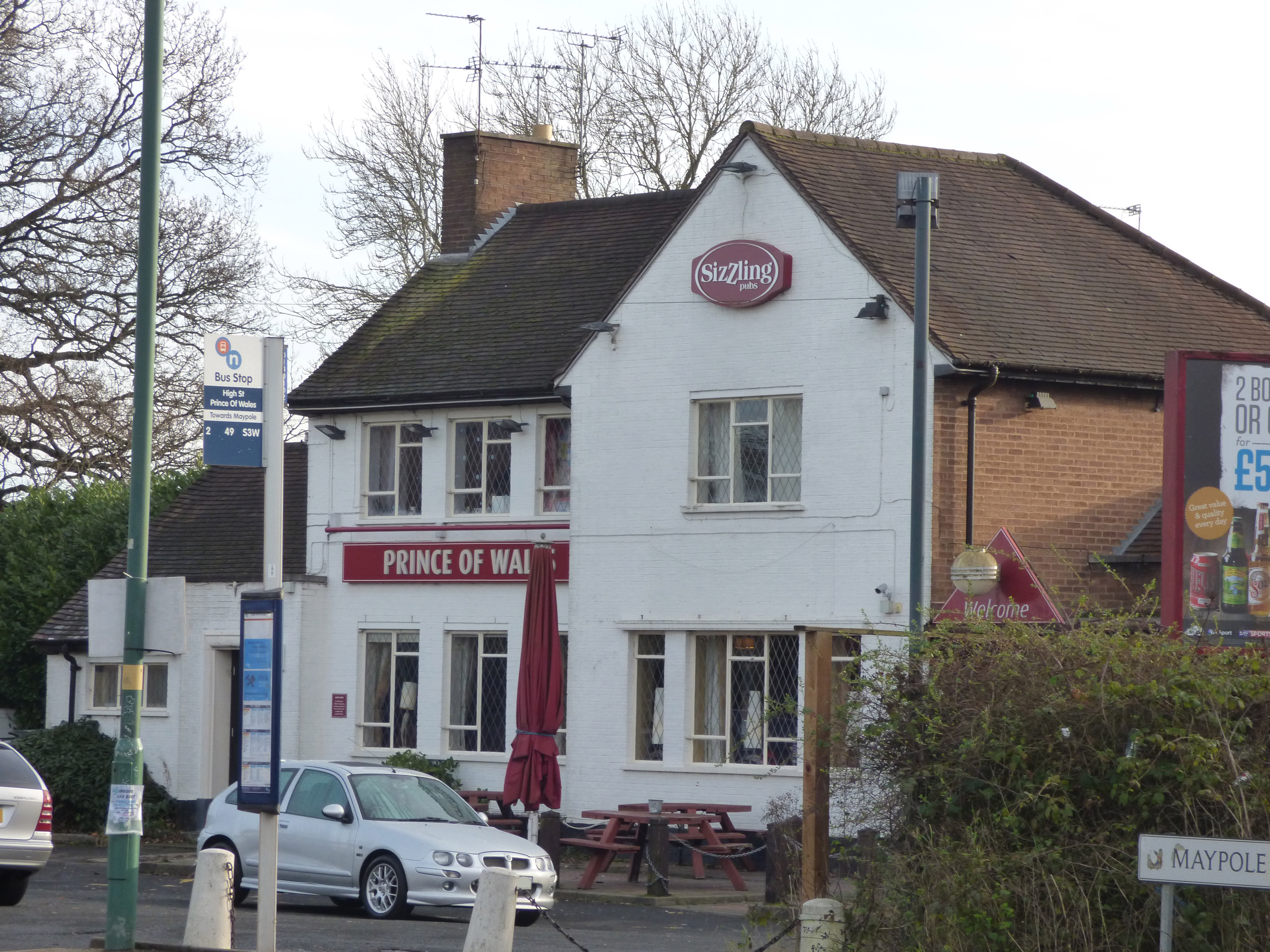
Former Prince of Wales Public House, Solihull Lodge

Solihull Lodge is a residential area of Solihull, England (to the southwest of Shirley), near its border with Birmingham (Yardley Wood and Warstock areas). The area developed originally from a number of farms which were located near the Mill Pond on Priory Road. The arrival of the Birmingham–Stratford canal enabled more development, and now the area has a population of around 2,500. The area includes Peterbrook Primary School, The Lodge Public House, Solihull Lodge Community Centre, and local shops Oxhill Road One Stop and Esso Spar.
