= Christ Church, Yardley Wood =

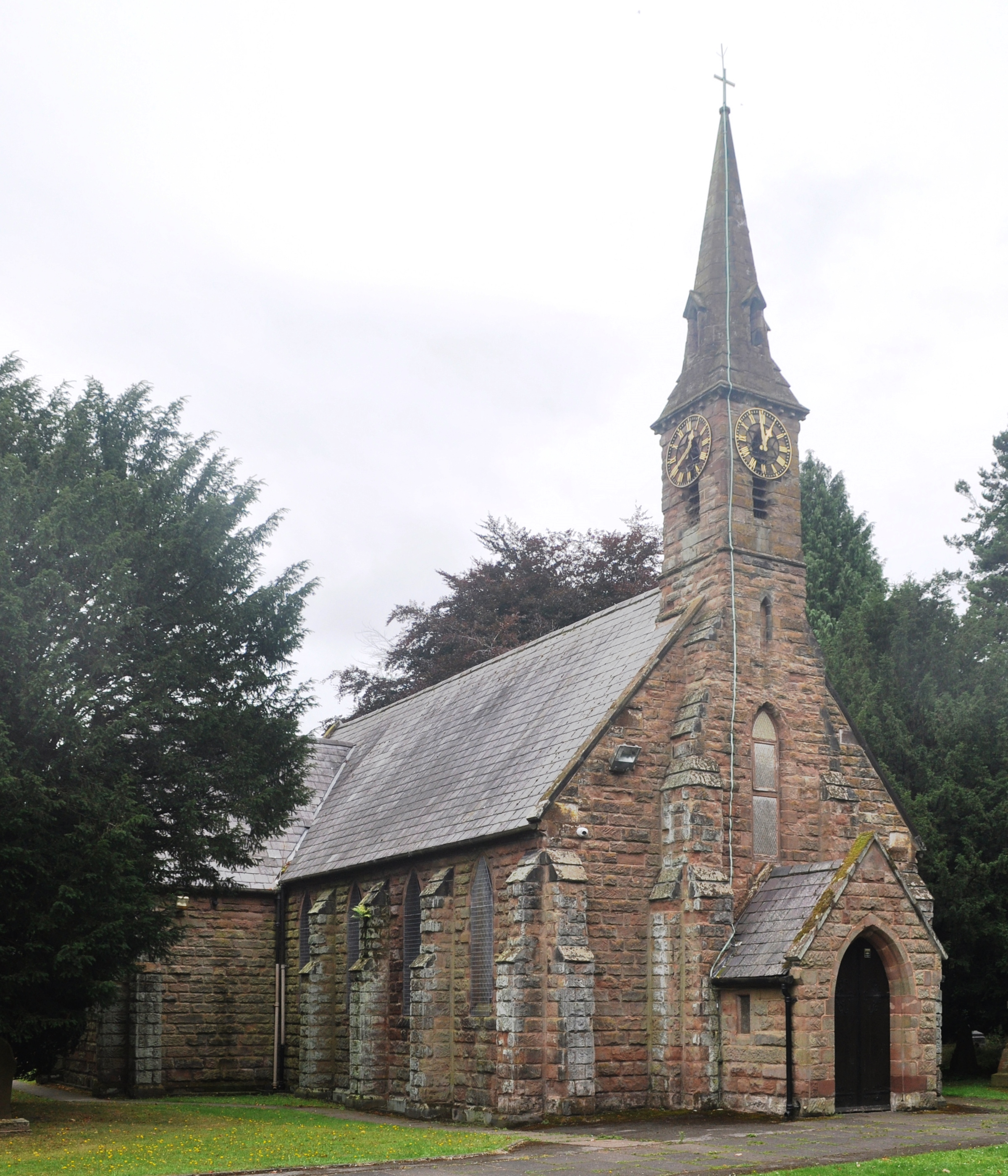
- Christ Church in August 2024
- Christ Church, Yardley Wood
- 52°24′49″N 1°51′53″W
- OS grid reference: SP 09191 79552
- Location: Yardley Wood, Birmingham
- Country: England
- Denomination: Church of England
- Website: www.christchurch-yardleywood.org.uk

History
- Dedication: Christ

Architecture
- Heritage designation: Grade II listed
- Architect: Arthur Edward Perkins
- Completed: 1849
- Construction cost: £1,550

Administration
- Diocese: Anglican Diocese of Birmingham
- Archdeaconry: Birmingham
- Deanery: Moseley
- Parish: Yardley Wood

Clergy
- Vicar: Lydia Gaston

Christ Church, Yardley Wood is a Grade II listed parish church in the Church of England in Birmingham.

== History ==
The foundation stone was laid on 14 April 1848. The church was built by Sarah Taylor of Moor Green to designs by the architect, Arthur Edward Perkins. It was consecrated on 28 March 1849 by the Bishop of Worcester.

A parish was assigned in 1849 out of St Edburgha's Church, Yardley and St Nicolas' Church, Kings Norton.

The west tower was completed in 1896.

Parts of the parish were taken to form the parish of St Agnes' Church, Moseley in 1914, Holy Cross Church, Billesley Common in 1937, and Immanuel Church, Highter's Heath in 1938.

The church contains wood paneling and carving given by the Earl of Denbigh to St Bartholomew's Church, Birmingham, and moved to Christ Church after that church was destroyed in the Second World War.

== Organ ==
A barrel organ by J.W. Walker was installed here from St Mary's Church, Moseley. This was replaced or extended by Halmshaw and Conacher. A specification of the organ can be found on the National Pipe Organ Register. The organ is no longer present.
