= Yardley Wood =

Area of Birmingham, England

Coordinates: 52.418662°N 1.850586°W

- Location within the West Midlands
- OS grid reference: SP103802
- Metropolitan borough: Birmingham
- Metropolitan county: West Midlands
- Region: West Midlands
- Country: England
- Sovereign state: United Kingdom
- Post town: BIRMINGHAM
- Postcode district: B14
- Dialling code: 0121
- Police: West Midlands
- Fire: West Midlands
- Ambulance: West Midlands
- UK Parliament: Birmingham Selly Oak

Yardley Wood is an area of Birmingham, England. It covers the easternmost quadrant of postcode area B14 (as well as Priory Road and adjacent streets up to the city boundary), and is located across the wards of Billesley and Highter's Heath in the south of the city.

To the west, the area is contiguous with Warstock. Other nearby settlements include Billesley, Highter's Heath, Hall Green, Solihull Lodge, and Kings Heath.

Yardley Wood is remote from the Birmingham suburb of Yardley which is located to the east of the city, although historically (before the 1911 Greater Birmingham Act) they were both in Yardley Rural District and hence lay within Worcestershire.

== Transport ==
The area is served by Yardley Wood railway station, despite the station being located just inside the Hall Green (B28 postcode) area, as well as by the following bus routes:

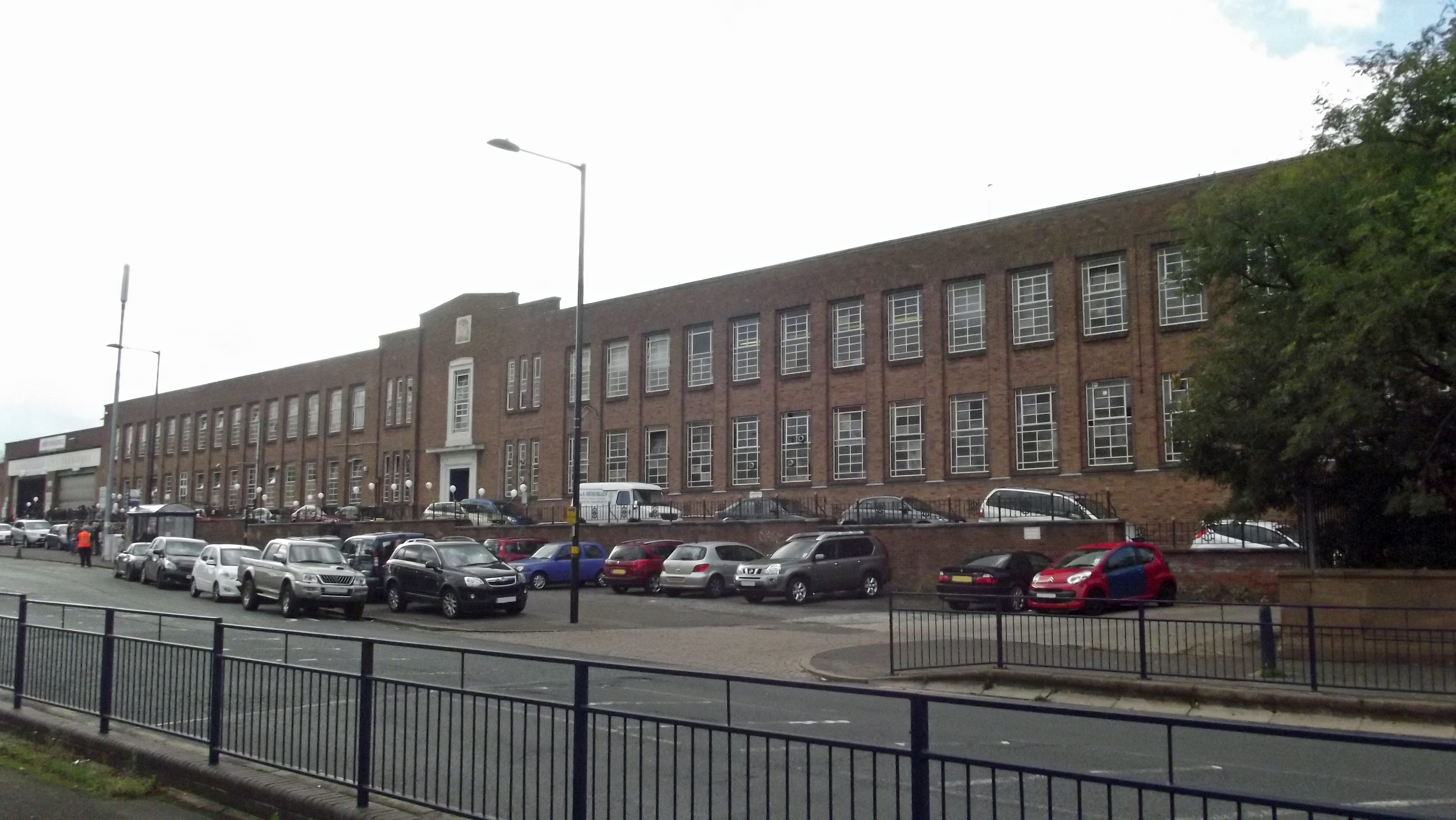
Yardley Wood Bus Garage - Yardley Wood Road

.....	Yardley Wood Road
2	Birmingham to Maypole via Stoney Lane
18	to Bartley Green via Cotteridge and Northfield
27	Solihull to Rubery Great Park via Monkspath, Shirley, Kings Heath, Stirchley, Bournville and Northfield
.....	School Rd / Ravenshill Rd / Priory Rd
3	Yardley Wood, Slade Lane to Birmingham

Additionally, bus route 76 (Queen Elizabeth Hospital to Solihull) serves the railway station. All these bus services are run by National Express West Midlands, who have a large depot in Yardley Wood with over 400 employees.

The Stratford-upon-Avon Canal runs through Yardley Wood (marking the boundary between Billesley and Highter's Heath wards), sitting in a deep cutting where it passes beneath School Road. The canal towpath can be accessed at Yardley Wood Road (bridge no. 5), at a location once known as Happy Valley, and from Priory Fields Nature Reserve (in turn accessed from Priory Road), as well as at High Street, Solihull Lodge (bridge no. 7).

== Community ==
Local schools include Yardley Wood Community Primary School, plus Highters Heath Community School (on the border with Warstock), Our Lady of Lourdes RC Primary School (on the border with Billesley), and Christ Church C of E Secondary Academy.

Yardley Wood Library is located on Highfield Road.

Christ Church, Yardley Wood is the local parish church. There is also a local Baptist Church.

The area includes Warstock Community Centre (adjacent to Highters Heath Community School) and a social club, as well as several linked areas of natural beauty.
