= Wythall railway station =

Railway station in Worcestershire, England

Coordinates: 52.380°N 1.866°W

Wythall
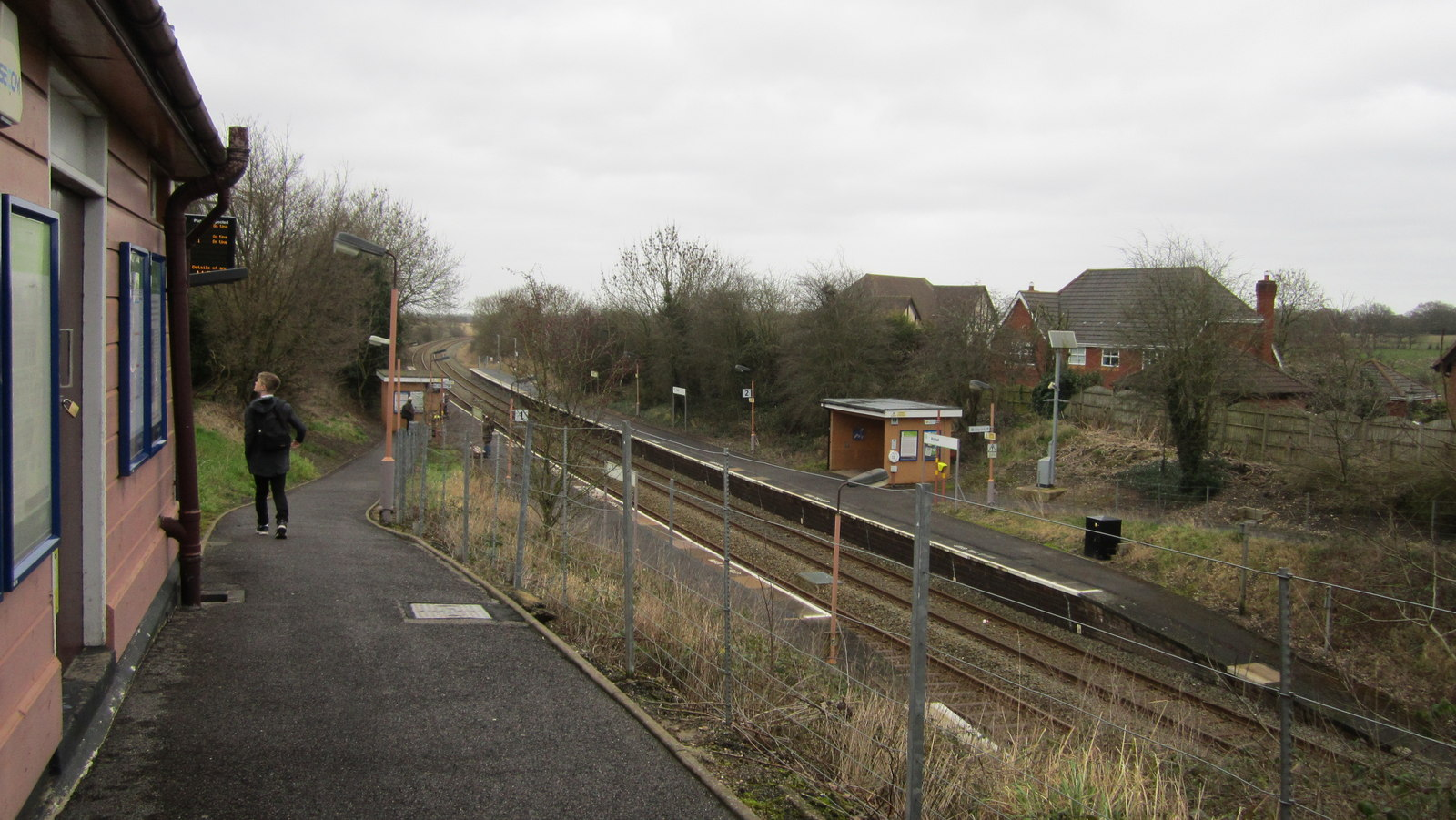

General information
- Location: Wythall, Bromsgrove; England
- Grid reference: SP092758
- Manager: West Midlands Trains
- Transit authority: Transport for West Midlands
- Platforms: 2

Other information
- Station code: WYT
- Fare zone: 5
- Classification: DfT category E

Key dates
- 1 July 1908: Opened as Grimes Hill Platform
- 12 July 1914: Renamed Grimes Hill & Wythall Halt
- 11 July 1927: Renamed Grimes Hill and Wythall Platform
- 6 May 1974: Renamed Wythall

Passengers
- 2021/22: ▲46,348
- 2022/23: ▲51,570
- 2023/24: ▲58,554
- 2024/25: ▲65,636
- 2025/26: ▲75,354
Location
Notes
- Passenger statistics from the Office of Rail and Road

Wythall railway station serves the village of Wythall in Worcestershire, England. The station, and all trains serving it, are operated by West Midlands Trains.

Although situated just outside the West Midlands county, the station lies within the area supported by Transport for West Midlands given its proximity to Tidbury Green, and therefore TfWM-issued tickets for train travel are valid for travel to the station, but TfWM-issued bus tickets are not. London Midland closed the ticket office in 2011.

The station opened as Grimes Hill Platform on 1 July 1908. It then became Grimes Hill & Wythall Halt on 12 July 1914; Grimes Hill and Wythall Platform on 11 July 1927; the suffix was dropped on 9 July 1934 and it finally became Wythall on 6 May 1974.

== Services ==
The station is served by hourly trains in each direction between Birmingham Snow Hill and Stratford-upon-Avon, with most Birmingham services continuing through to Stourbridge Junction. There is also an hourly Sunday service in each direction, to Worcester Foregate Street and Stratford.

Preceding station	National Rail	Following station
Whitlocks End	West Midlands Railway; North Warwickshire Line	Earlswood
