= Maypole, Birmingham =

Area of Birmingham, England

Coordinates: 52.4059°N 1.8843°W

The Maypole, Birmingham is a location on the A435 road on the southern edge of Birmingham, England, between Druids Heath and Highter's Heath and bordering the Bromsgrove district of Worcestershire. It has a population of 2,260 according to the 2011 Census.

== Transport ==
The Maypole is also situated close to major transport links, such as the M42 via the A435 Hollywood bypass. The A435 intersects the M42 at junction 3, close to both the M5 and M40 intersections which lie west and east of junction 3 respectively. The Maypole is located about 7 miles south of Birmingham city centre which is connected by the 50 bus route which runs through the Maypole and terminates adjacent to the Selfridges building in the city centre. The 50 bus route is one of the most regular bus routes in Europe, arriving at Maypole every 5 minutes. Solihull can be reached by the 49 bus route which runs every 20 minutes and which also runs in the other direction to Cotteridge. Bus route 2 also runs every 20 minutes to Yardley Wood.

== Local amenities ==
The area is served by a number of shops including banks and food outlets. The famous Arsenal F.C. striker and commentator Alan Smith attended Hollywood Primary School which is situated on Pickenham Road close to the Emmanuel Church.

== Notable events ==
Back in 2008, a troubled group of students attending Baverstock Sports College made headlines when they donned patriotic garb on St. George's Day, April 23. Local newspapers reported that the boys, aged 15 were told by staff to have their St George’s Day crosses washed out of their hair and face or be sent home. Anthony Fuller, aged 15, who lives in Druids Heath, said: "We were made to celebrate South Africa Day a couple of weeks ago, but when it comes to our own national day, the school does this. I thought it was bang out of order." His Mom Pauline, 31, said "He just had a red stripe through his hair and a cross on the side of his face. It was just for a bit of fun. There was nothing political about it." The incident came as St George's Day was celebrated in Birmingham with events including a curry festival, a big city walk and a performer dressed as St George handing out flowers.
