= National Express West Midlands =

Bus operator in the West Midlands of England

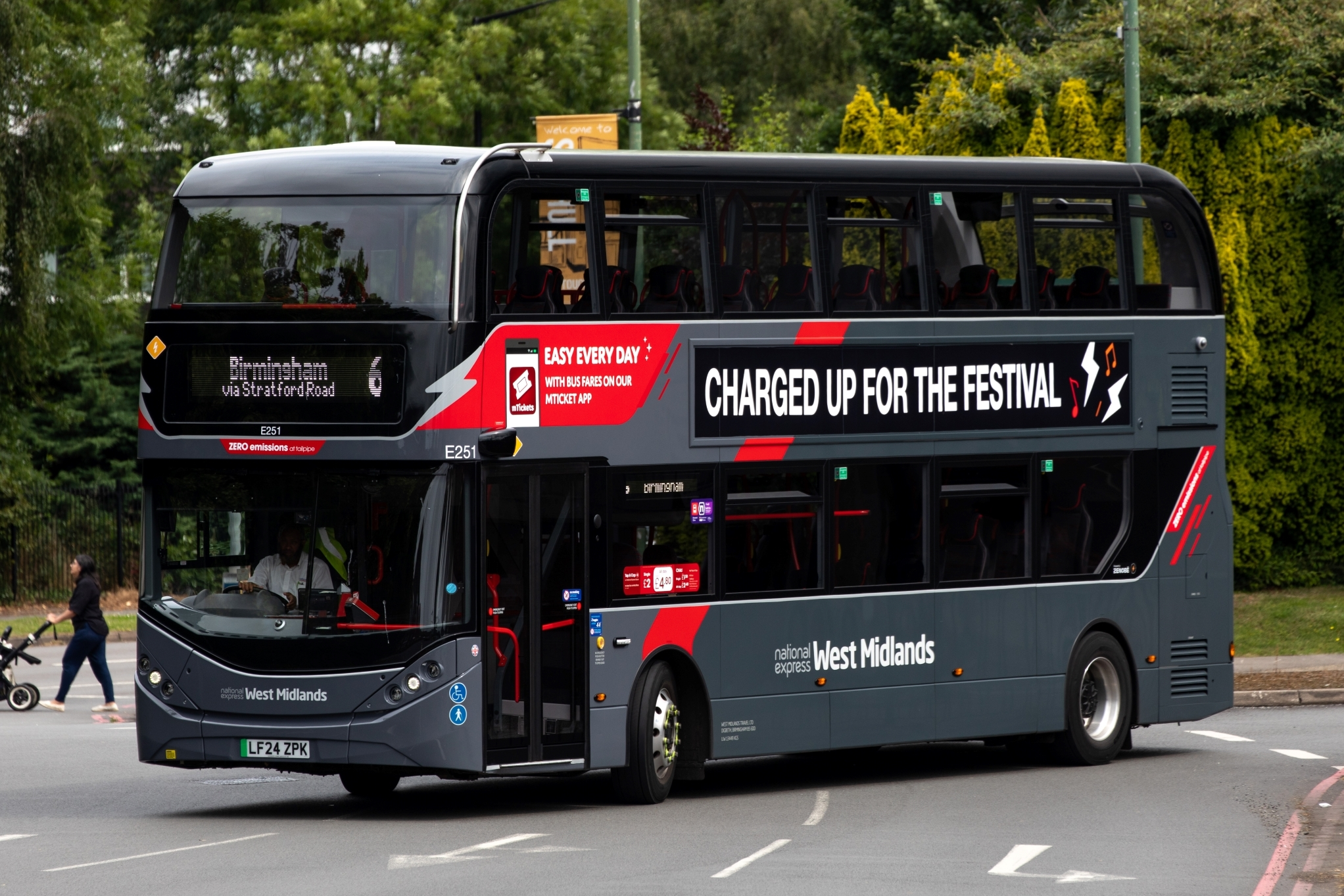
- BYD Alexander Dennis Enviro400EV in Solihull in July 2024
- Parent: Mobico Group
- Founded: August 1986
- Defunct: 31 October 2026
- Headquarters: Digbeth, Birmingham, England
- Service area: West Midlands
- Service type: Bus services
- Alliance: National Express Coventry
- Depots: 8
- Fleet: 1,600+
- Managing Director: Sarah East
- Website: www.nxbus.co.uk

National Express West Midlands (NXWM) was a bus operator in the West Midlands of England owned by the Mobico Group.

On 1 November 2026, operations of both NXWM and National Express Coventry transferred to a new company, West Midlands Bus, ahead of the sale of the company to the West Midlands Combined Authority.

NXWM operated services in Birmingham, Coventry, Dudley, Sandwell, Walsall, Wolverhampton and Solihull, as well as express services from Birmingham to areas such as Cofton Hackett and Bromsgrove.

== History ==
=== Deregulation ===
Former logos

Logo from 1986–1996

Logo from 1996–2008

Logo from 2008–2015

In August 1986, prior to the deregulation of bus services, West Midlands Travel (WMT) was formed out the bus operations of the West Midlands Passenger Transport Executive. The PTE ceased to be a bus operator as a result of the Transport Act 1985, but both the West Midlands Passenger Transport Authority and successor organisation Transport for West Midlands retain a co-ordinating role, tendering bus services and funding concessionary fares and infrastructure such as bus stations.

West Midlands Travel faced its first major deregulation challenge in March 1987 when London Regional Transport (LRT) pulled out of its 'London Liner' London to Birmingham express coach service. Operated jointly by both LRT's London Coaches subsidiary and WMT's Central Coachways subsidiary using a fleet of MCW Metroliner coaches, following London Coaches' withdrawal, Central Coachways continued to run the service as its sole operator from the end of March.

The company invested in a heavy rebranding campaign in 1988 that saw the introduction of a new silver, blue and red livery to the bus fleet, new uniforms, and the purchase of 150 new MCW Metrobus double-decker buses. After 18 months of deregulation, WMT announced in October 1988 that it had made a profit of over £17.6 million (equivalent to £48,998,000 in 2025), retained 97% of its pre-deregulation bus network and had recorded a 5% drop in passengers compared to before deregulation; the latter, however, increased to a drop of 10% by 1989, resulting in fare rises and cutbacks in its bus network.

=== Employee ownership ===
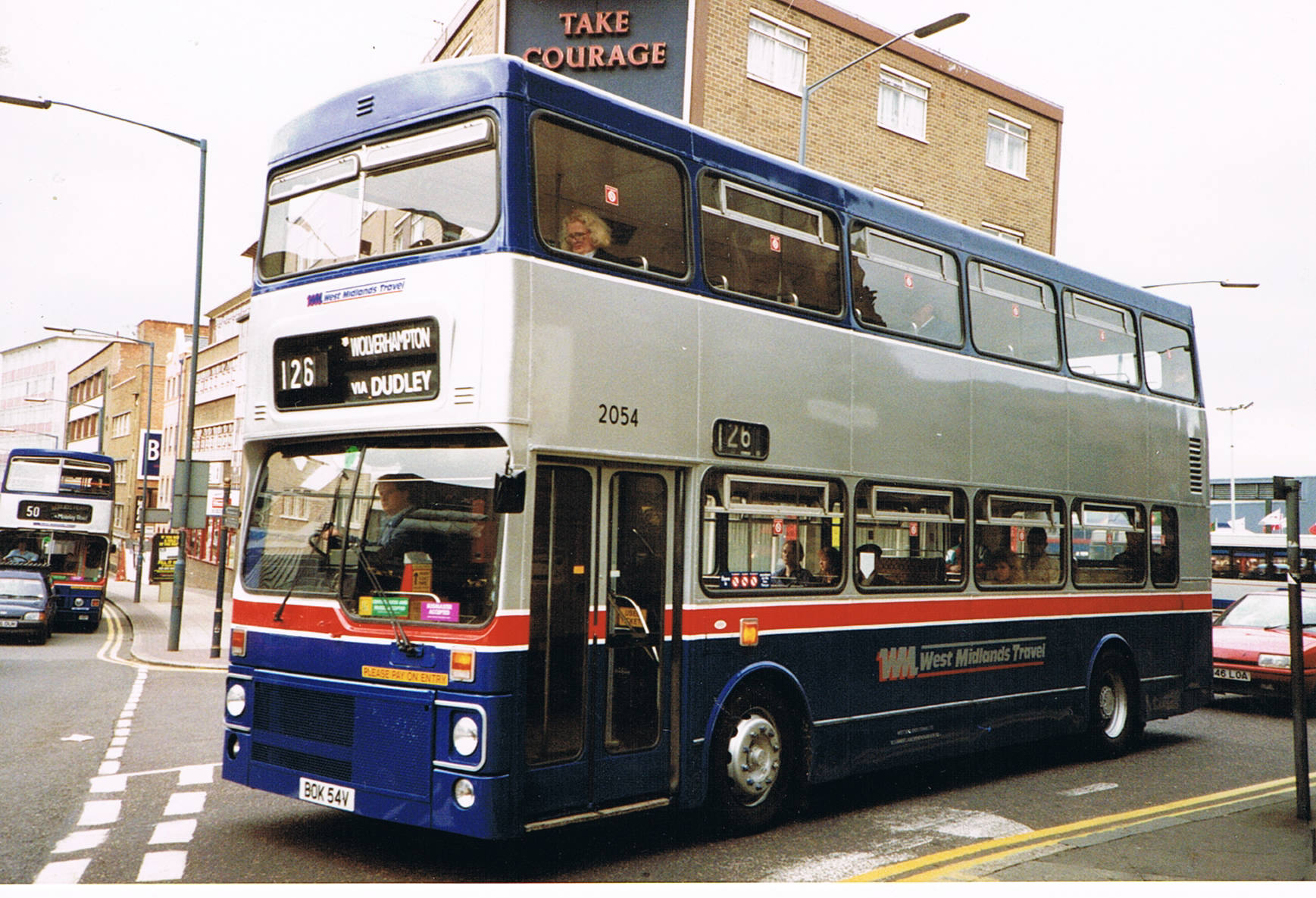
West Midlands Travel MCW Metrobus in Birmingham in April 1993

Despite pressure from the central government, including both a threat to be split under Section 61 of the Transport Act 1985 to force its sale and government funding for the Midland Metro tram project being lost if the company was not sold, West Midlands Travel remained in public ownership under the West Midlands Passenger Transport Authority. Plans for a management buyout through an Employee Share Ownership Plan (ESOP) were first submitted to the WMPTA in June 1989 by WMT's management and employees in response to the splitting threat, which were approved by the PTA and submitted to Minister of State for Transport Michael Portillo in early 1990; after a competing bid by Stagecoach Group owner Brian Souter to buy WMT for £85 million (equivalent to £195,496,000 in 2025) was rejected by the PTA, the ESOP offer was finally approved in December 1991, with WMT sold to its management and employees for £70 million (equivalent to £160,997,000 in 2025).

In November 1992, West Midlands Travel was ordered to have its entire fleet of over 1,800 buses given MOT tests by July 1993 after 108 fleet vehicles were found by the Vehicle Inspectorate to be poorly maintained, with faults including faulty brakes, broken lights and bell pushes, oil leaks, and damaged passenger seating. In an examination of 343 WMT fleet vehicles, inspectors immediately prohibited 66 from running services and marked 42 as being in need of repair; twelve WMT buses found to have faults so serious that they were classified as "neglected" by the examiners.

West Midlands Travel also made a number of acquisitions during its employee ownership. In 1990, WMT partly owned minibus operator Merry Hill Motors, and that same year, WMT purchased a fleet of new Alexander bodied Scania N113 double-decker buses to compete with Your Bus of Alcester; Your Bus was later acquired by WMT in 1993. Retained as subsidiary companies of WMT, these operators were later rebranded to Travel Merry Hill and Travel Your Bus respectively before being absorbed into the main Travel West Midlands operation by 2001. A further competitor purchased by WMT in August 1993 was Metrowest Omnibus of Dudley, which was also retained as a separate subsidiary of WMT after founding director Keith Danks left the company a month prior.

In April 1994, West Midlands Travel made its first out-of-area acquisition by purchasing former London Buses subsidiary Westlink from its employee owners, followed in October by the purchase two Essex-based companies from the Lynton Group: County Bus & Coach, a bus operator formed from the split of London Country North East that consisted of over 240 vehicles, as well as Sampson Coaches. Westlink was sold by WMT to fellow former London Buses subsidiary London United a year later, while County Bus & Coach was later sold to the Cowie Group.

West Midlands Travel underwent another rebrand during 1994. Buses had their West Midlands Travel fleetnames replaced with "WM Buses" and the corresponding name of the depot the bus was based from, forming combinations such as WM Buses Acocks Green, amid moves by senior management to use the West Midlands Travel name as a holding company ahead of a possible floatation of WMT on the London Stock Exchange.

=== National Express/Mobico ownership ===
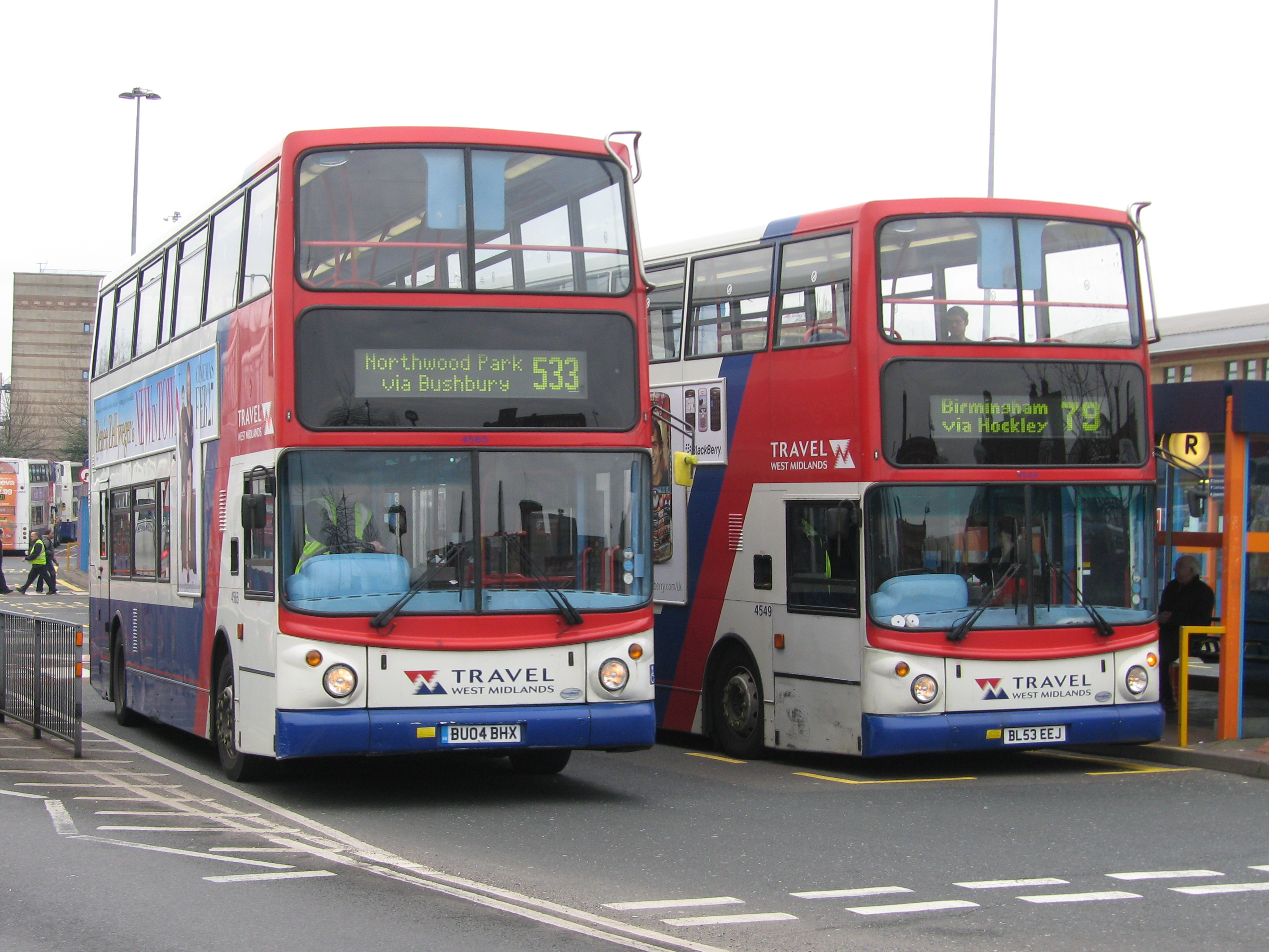
Two Travel West Midlands TransBus ALX400s at Wolverhampton bus station in 2008

In March 1995, the National Express Group purchased West Midlands Travel from employee ownership for £85 million (equivalent to £501,642,000 in 2025), with over 5,000 employee shareholders of WMT receiving windfall gains averaging £30,000 (equivalent to £62,000 in 2025). Operations were subsequently merged into the National Express Group in April. In September 1996, WMT was rebranded to Travel West Midlands. This was followed in November 1997 with the sale of TWM's Central Coachways arm to the Flights Travel Group.

In November 2002, Travel West Midlands' Coventry services were separated from the main TWM operation and rebranded to Travel Coventry.

In February 2008, as part of a rebranding of all National Express subsidiaries, Travel West Midlands was renamed National Express West Midlands, with the adopted red and white livery being the sixth livery to be used by the company. The Travel Coventry operation was also rebranded as National Express Coventry.

Having overbid for the National Express East Coast rail franchise, on 3 September 2009, the National Express Group's largest shareholder, Spain's Cosmen family, and private equity company CVC Capital Partners made a takeover offer of £765 million (equivalent to £1.220693×10^{9} in 2025) for the group's coaching and North American school bus businesses, with the Stagecoach Group agreeing to acquire the National Express Group's UK bus and rail operations, including National Express West Midlands, as part of the sale. In preparation for the potential sale, a handful of NXWM buses were painted white, while Stagecoach considered selling its Stagecoach Midlands division in order to satisfy anti-monopoly requirements. After the CVC-Cosmen deal collapsed in October, Stagecoach made a £1.7 billion (equivalent to £2.712651×10^{9} in 2025) merger offer to National Express, however this bid was called off amid fears it could not be completed by the end of the year.

National Express West Midlands aimed for their whole fleet to be low-floor by March 2010, a goal that was achieved in July of that year with the withdrawal of the final MCW Metrobuses in public service at Acocks Green garage.

In August 2026, Mobico Group announced its sale of National Express West Midlands to the West Midlands Combined Authority. A new company, West Midlands Bus, was formed taking over the operations of National Express West Midlands on 1 November 2026. The new company will be sold by Mobico to the WCMA on 1 December 2026.

== Services ==
=== Platinum ===
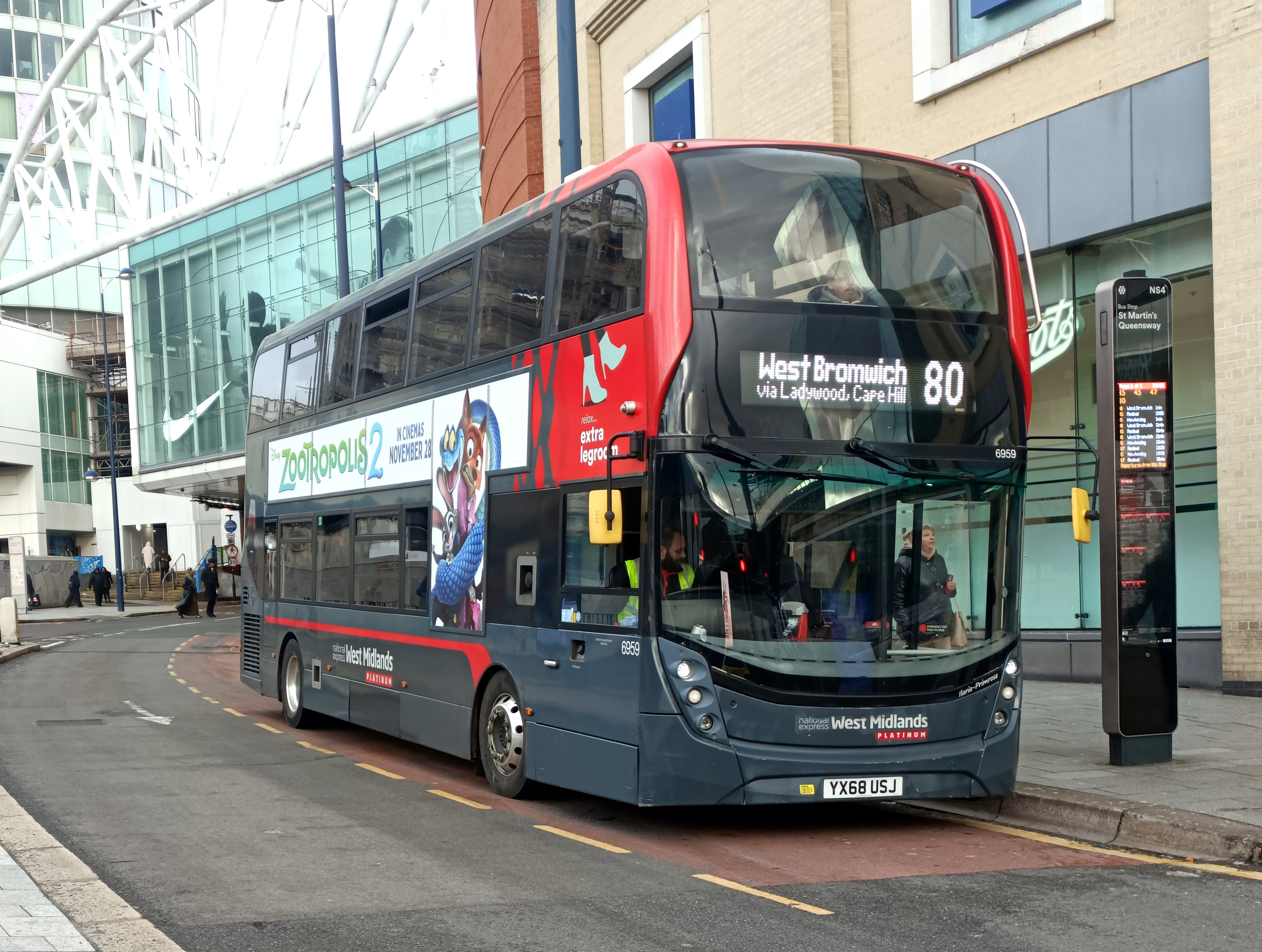
Platinum-branded Alexander Dennis Enviro400 MMC on route 80 in November 2025

In 2015, National Express West Midlands launched the Platinum brand. The Platinum range of buses is a premium brand which offers passengers extra legroom, high backed seats, next stop announcements (on supported services), free Wi-Fi and USB charging on a select series of routes in the West Midlands. The Platinum brand uses Alexander Dennis Enviro400 MMCs, Alexander Dennis Enviro400EVs and Wright StreetDeck Hydroliners, which are usually painted in a grey and red colour scheme; some buses are given special colour schemes for select services such as the 8/X8, 9, 16, 50 and 82/87. Drivers on Platinum services are issued with suit-style uniforms.

Deliveries of the first Platinum buses began in 2015, with 58 Alexander Dennis Enviro400 MMCs from a larger order of 171 buses delivered with Platinum branding. These were initially deployed on services 900 and 957, since renumbered X1 and X2, before being rolled out onto services 934, 935, 936, 997 and X51 later in the year. The Platinum brand was rolled out into the Black Country in 2016 with the delivery of a further 96 Platinum Enviro400 MMCs, resulting in Platinum buses being cascaded from Birmingham Central garage to Pensnett for the Merry Hill to Birmingham X10 service, and then expanded to Harborne in December 2017 with the delivery of 38 new buses. The Platinum brand further expanded again in 2018 with the delivery of 72 more Enviro400 MMCs, some of which were delivered to National Express Coventry for the city's first Platinum services, while the West Midlands buses operated on routes connecting Stourbridge, Druids Heath and Chelmsley Wood with central Birmingham.

National Express West Midlands' first zero-emissions BYD-D8UR-DD ADL Enviro400 City EV buses were built to Platinum specification, and entered service in July 2020 on route 6 from Birmingham to Solihull via Shirley. The fuel cell electric Wright StreetDeck Hydroliners that followed entered service on route 51 from Birmingham to Walsall via Perry Barr. There were further additions to the electric fleet of buses in April 2025, where 170 new Alexander Dennis Enviro400 double decker zero emission buses were added to the fleet. This brings the total number of electric buses in operation to 329.

As of January 2024, the Platinum Fleet is no longer providing free Wi-Fi. The reasoning for this is that despite pulling in an average of 600,000 passengers daily, only 1% (~6,000 a day) used the Wi-Fi provided.

=== Sprint ===
The Sprint cross-city bus rapid transit service was first announced in July 2014, initially taking the form of a single service linking Birmingham city centre and Quinton via Hagley Road, connecting with the Metro's Line One extension as 'Metro's Little Sister'.

Following the awarding of the 2022 Commonwealth Games to Birmingham in 2016, it was announced that the Sprint network would expand with three additional cross-city bus routes linking Solihull, Sutton Coldfield and Walsall with Birmingham City Centre. These services are to be operated by National Express West Midlands; it was originally envisaged that this route would be operated by 24 Van Hool ExquiCity articulated buses in time for the Commonwealth Games, however it was later announced in 2019 that construction of infrastructure related to the Sprint articulated buses was delayed until after the Commonwealth Games.

Phase 1 of the Sprint network was completed in May 2022, with bus lanes and priority junctions being introduced on commuter corridors on the A34 and A45 roads.

== Fleet and depots ==
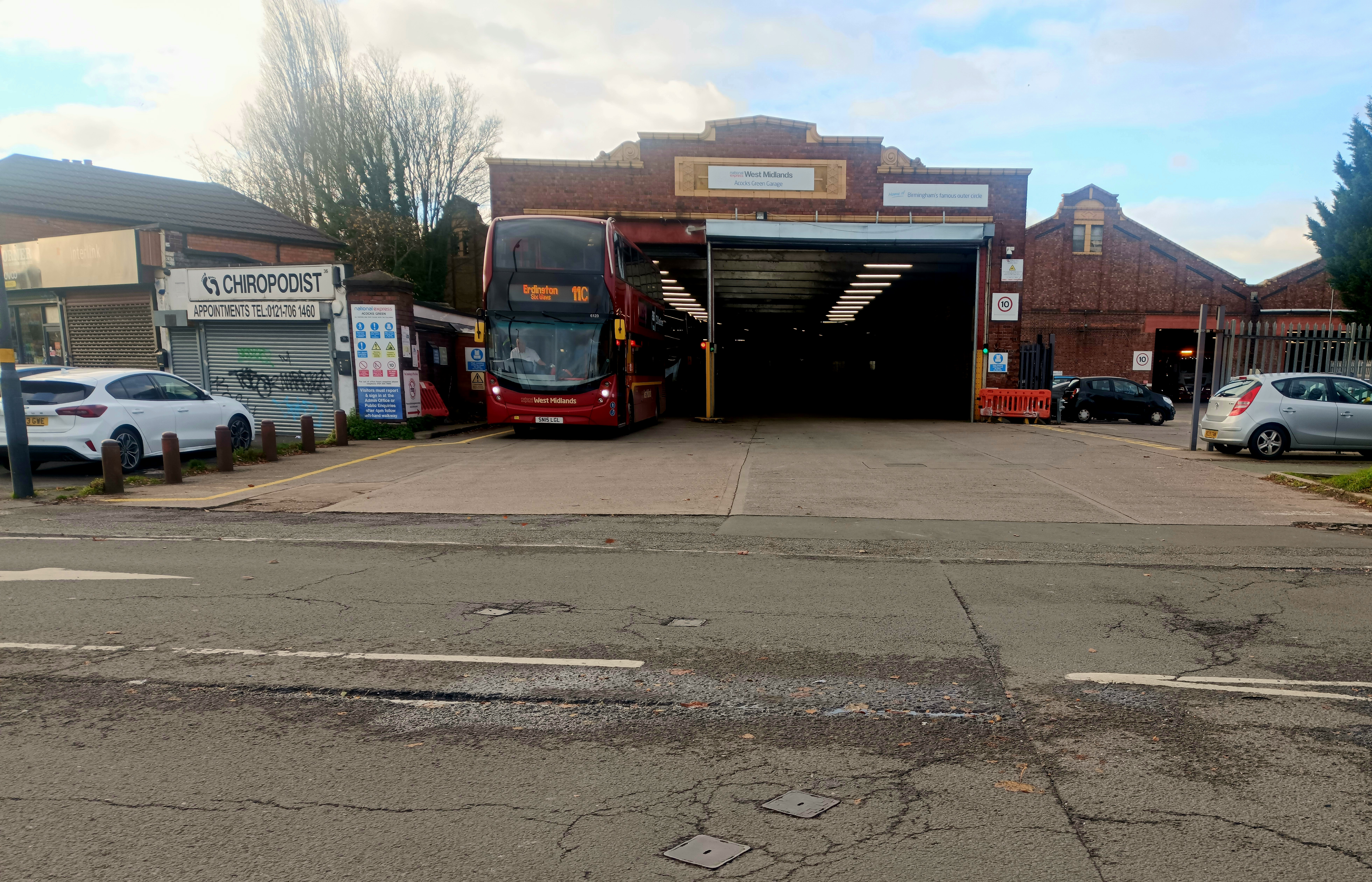
Acocks Green Garage in November 2025

As of June 2024, National Express West Midlands operates a fleet of over 1,600 buses and coaches from eight garages in Acocks Green, Birmingham Central (Digbeth), Perry Barr, Yardley Wood, Pensnett, Walsall, West Bromwich and Wolverhampton. Perry Barr is the newest location, having opened in December 2022. The site, housing infrastructure for charging a fleet of electric buses and a bus driving simulator as well as featuring 150 solar panels, environmentally-friendly heating systems and water recycling for the three bus washes on site, replaces the 90-year-old original Perry Bar garage, which was deemed unsuitable for modernisation and housing charging infrastructure.

Prior to the construction of the new Perry Barr garage, Bordesley Green garage was the newest location, having opened in 2005. Bordesley Green was also the headquarters for National Express West Midlands, which replaced a freehold office site in St Paul's Square that WMT moved to in 1994; this office replaced the original WMT headquarters located in a building on Summer Lane, Birmingham that was shared with Centro. Bordesley Green garage closed in 2022 following the sale of the land in and around the depot for redevelopment, resulting in the head office relocating to the National Express Group headquarters in Digbeth, and Walsall bus garage was sold to the West Midlands Combined Authority ahead of the introduction of bus franchising and further hydrogen buses on the NXWM network.

Previously garages in Stourbridge, Dudley, Merry Hill (part of Travel Merry Hill), Harts Hill, Sutton Coldfield, Hockley, Cotteridge, Selly Oak, Wolverhampton (Cleveland Road), Washwood Heath, Harborne and Quinton have been operated. The Dudley garage closed on 28 August 1993 to make way for the Dudley Southern By-Pass (which opened in 1999) and was replaced, along with the former Travel Merry Hill depot, by a depot at Pensnett. In July 2010, Lea Hall depot closed.

On 4 February 1998, Travel West Midlands were poised to become the first bus operator in the United Kingdom to operate a double-decker low-floor bus in service, with Birmingham Central garage having taken delivery of one of two Optare Spectra bodied DAF DB250LFs in October 1997. However, Abus of Bristol, who had also bought a low-floor Spectra, managed to bring their bus out into service a few hours ahead of TWM, making them the first low-floor double-decker operators in the United Kingdom. 20 more Spectras were later delivered to TWM to upgrade West Midlands bus route 50 during 1998.

=== Alternative fuels ===
Alternatively fuelled buses were first introduced to the Travel West Midlands fleet in 1997, with 14 Alexander Ultra bodied Volvo B10Ls fuelled by compressed natural gas being launched on route 529, serving Walsall and Wolverhampton via Willenhall. These Ultras were supplied as part of a partnership supported by the Energy Saving Trust between TWM, Volvo Bus and British Gas, the latter of whom constructed CNG refuelling points at Walsall garage for the buses.

In February 2020, National Express announced its intention to operate a completely zero-emission bus fleet by 2030, pledging it would not buy another diesel-powered bus and only purchase zero-emissions vehicles for its West Midlands, Coventry and Dundee operations from 2020 onwards. The company's first nine BYD Alexander Dennis Enviro400EV battery electric buses began operation on 5 July 2020, with 20 hydrogen fuel cell-powered Wright StreetDeck Hydroliner buses following in late 2021. By 2024, over 200 BYD Enviro400EVs had been ordered for delivery to National Express West Midlands.

Further hydrogen-powered buses are set to enter the NXWM fleet following funding from the Department for Transport. A total of 124 hydrogen buses were due to enter service by 2024, which would have given Birmingham the largest hydrogen bus fleet in Europe. However due to a number of factors including fuel supply issues, as of January 2026 only the initial 20 have been delivered.

=== Health Bus ===
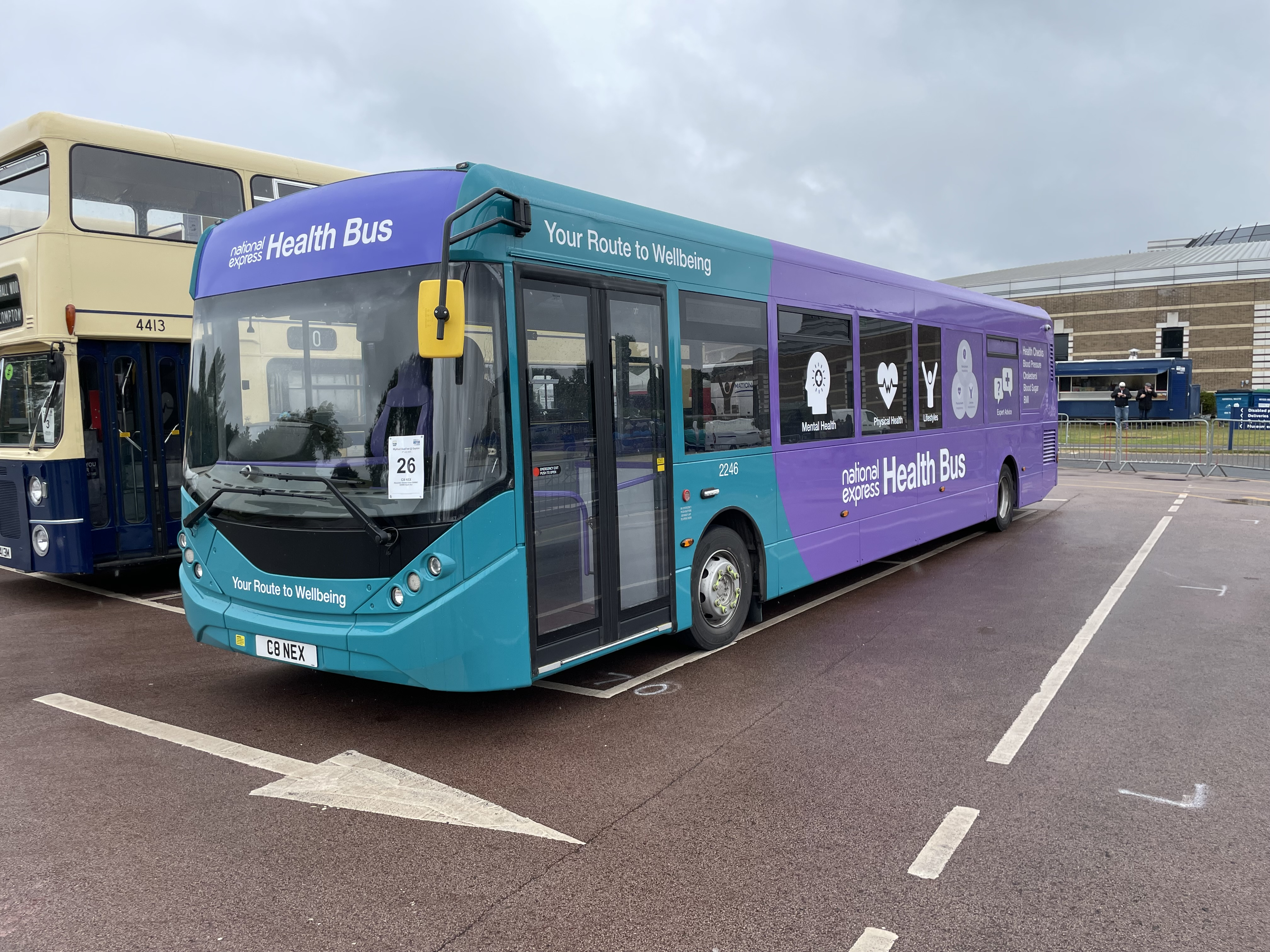
Health Bus Alexander Dennis Enviro200 MMC at the British Motor Museum, Gaydon, in July 2024

National Express West Midlands are responsible for the upkeep and maintenance of the Mobico Group's 'Health Bus', an employee benefit scheme free to use for all employees that travels across the Mobico Group's bus operations. Launched in 2014 using a converted Mercedes-Benz O405N single-deck bus, this scheme was upgraded in 2024 with the conversion of an Alexander Dennis Enviro200 MMC for use as the group Health Bus; featuring two in-built consultation rooms and a waiting room, the bus is operated by a health coach and a health coordinator, providing physical health checks to employees for their body mass index, body and fat, blood pressure, cholesterol and blood glucose levels.

=== Travel shops ===
NXWM previously operated five travel shops located in Dudley, Coventry Pool Meadow bus station, West Bromwich bus station, Birmingham, Corporation Street and Walsall bus station. All offices sold all types of Travelcards, National Express coach tickets and assist customers with information and route planning. The travel shop at Wolverhampton bus station was unique in that it was the only travel shop within a bus station not operated by NXWM, instead being operated by Transport for West Midlands (previously Centro then Network West Midlands), a division of the West Midlands Combined Authority.

In October 2021, National Express West Midlands announced that they were closing all of their travel shops; this was apparently due to people preferring to buy their tickets online and fewer people visiting their shops. The travel shop in Wolverhampton operated by TfWM closed permanently on 1 April 2023.
