= Druids Heath =

Housing estate in Birmingham, England

Coordinates: 52.406296°N 1.888328°W

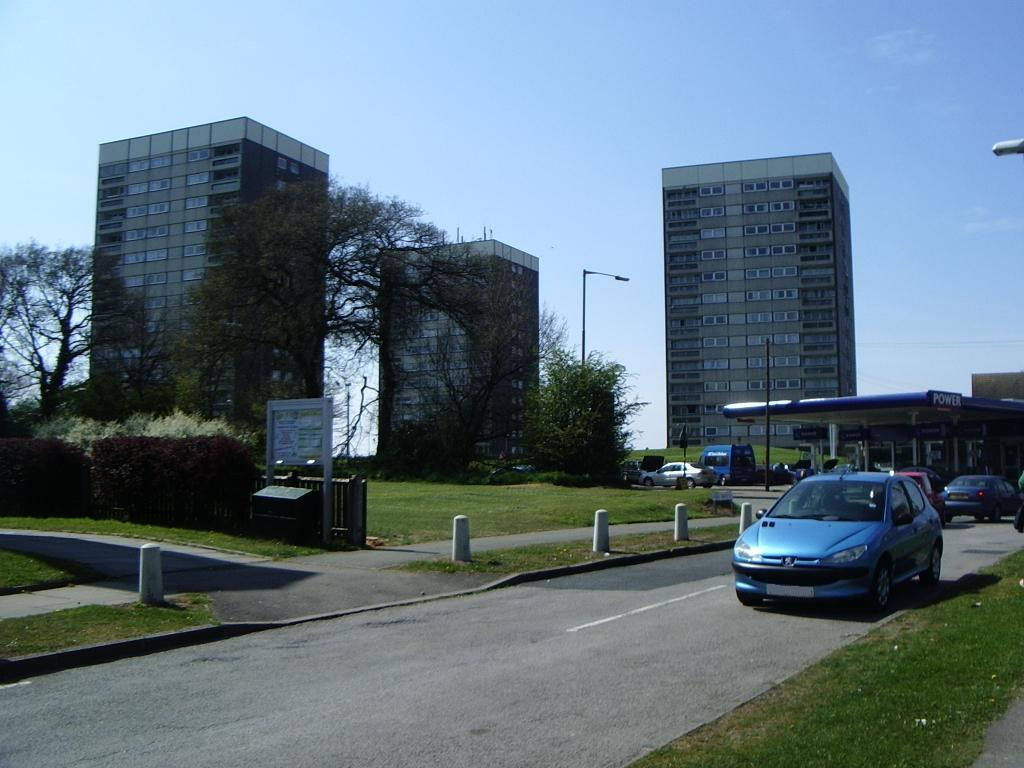
- Druids Heath Estate

- Location within the West Midlands
- OS grid reference: SP076786
- Metropolitan borough: Birmingham
- Metropolitan county: West Midlands
- Region: West Midlands
- Country: England
- Sovereign state: United Kingdom
- Post town: BIRMINGHAM
- Postcode district: B14
- Dialling code: 0121
- Police: West Midlands
- Fire: West Midlands
- Ambulance: West Midlands
- UK Parliament: Birmingham Selly Oak

Druids Heath is a large housing estate in Birmingham, in the county of the West Midlands, England. It is 6 miles (9.7 km) south of the city centre and covers the south-west quadrant of the B14 postcode (west of the Maypole) in the Brandwood ward. The estate was built on farmland at the southern edge of Bells Lane, with Druids Lane forming the eastern, southern, and western borders. When first planned, it was known as Bells Lane Phases 1 and 2 and was part of wider postwar plans for the development of the area to accommodate the growing population of the city. Nearby settlements include Kings Heath and Kings Norton.

Part of Druids Heath was ranked as the most deprived area in Birmingham and in the top fifty most deprived areas in the country in the 2019 Multiple deprivation index.

== History ==
The towers were constructed in the 1960s. In October 2025, Birmingham City Council approved plans for the demolition of the estate for its redevelopment although this was later quashed at the High Court.

== Etymology ==
The name Druids Heath was formerly Drews Heath named after a local family who farmed here until the mid-19th century. Drew's Farm stood at the junction of Druids Lane and Bells Lane near the Maypole.

== Politics ==
Druids Heath is in the local council ward of Druids Heath and Monyhull, which is represented by Green Party councillor Julien Pritchard. It is also in the parliamentary constituency of Birmingham Selly Oak, which is represented in the House of Commons by the Labour Member of Parliament (MP) Alistair Carns.

== Education ==
The schools within the Druids Heath area are; The Baverstock Academy (closed 2017), Bells Farm Primary School, The Oaks Primary School and St. Jude's RC Junior and Infant School.
