= Kings Heath =

Suburb of Birmingham, England

Coordinates: 52.43257°N 1.89327°W

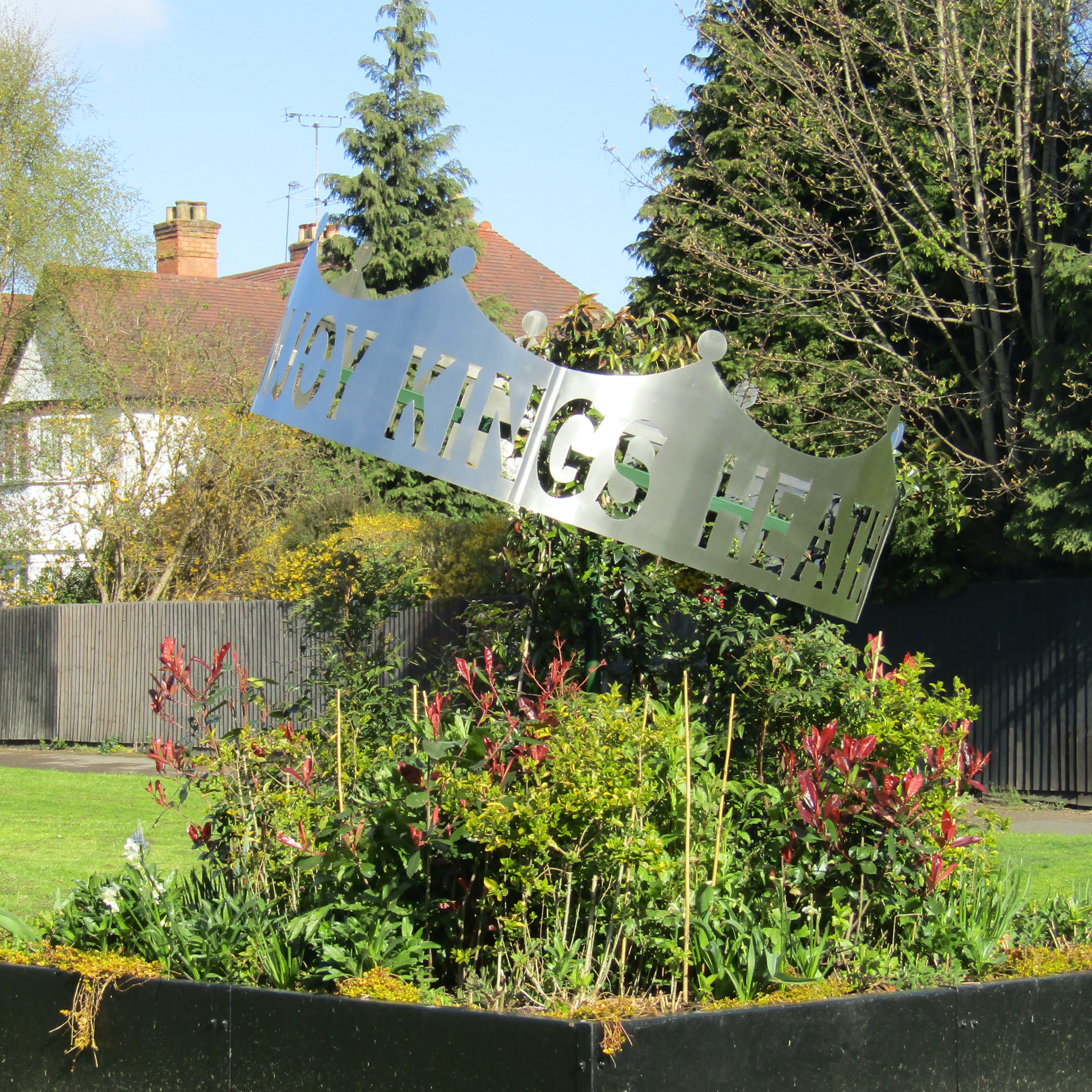

- Location within the West Midlands
- Population: 18,868 (estimate)
- OS grid reference: SP073816
- Metropolitan borough: Birmingham
- Metropolitan county: West Midlands
- Region: West Midlands
- Country: England
- Sovereign state: United Kingdom
- Post town: Birmingham
- Postcode district: B14
- Dialling code: 0121
- Police: West Midlands
- Fire: West Midlands
- Ambulance: West Midlands
- UK Parliament: Birmingham Hall Green and Moseley
- Councillors: Jordan Oliver Phillip (Green); Hamzah Fahd Sheikh (Green)

Kings Heath (historically, and still occasionally King's Heath) is a suburb of south Birmingham, England, four miles south of the city centre. Historically in Worcestershire, it is the next suburb south from Moseley on the A435 Alcester Road. Since 2018 it has been part of the Brandwood and Kings Heath Ward.

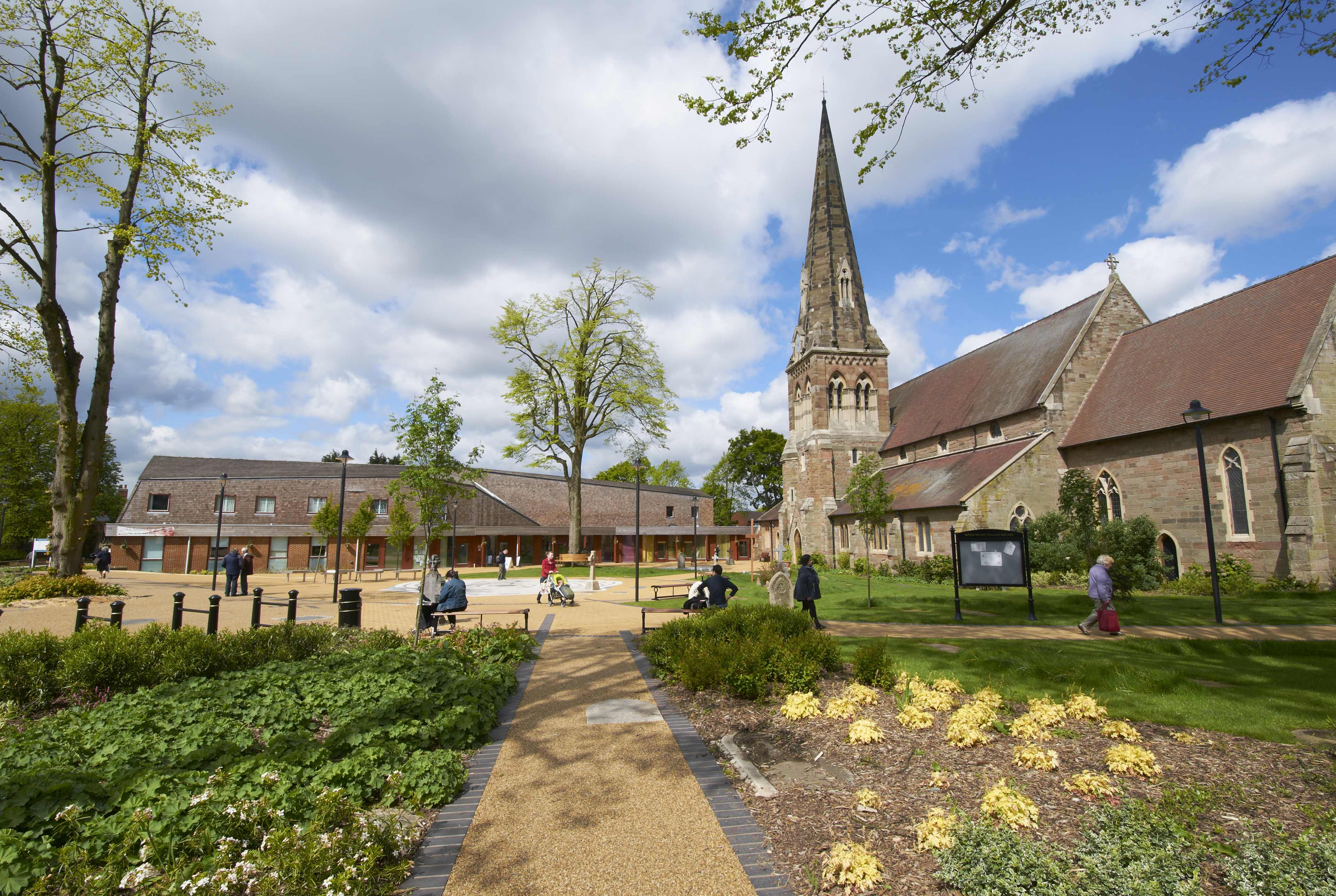
All Saints' Church

== History ==
Kings Heath came into being as a village in the 18th century when improvements to the Alcester to Birmingham road acted as a catalyst for the development of new houses and farms. Prior to this the area was largely uninhabited heathland, alternating under the control of Bromsgrove, Moseley, and Kings Norton.

The streets running off High Street are dominated by pre–1919 terraced, owner-occupied housing.

On 28 July 2005, Kings Heath was hit by a major tornado (by European standards), which damaged several shops on High Street and All Saints' Church. The tornado then moved on to damage many houses in Balsall Heath. There were no fatalities.

In 2008, the businesses agreed to establish a business improvement district, which top-slices a proportion of their local business taxes to go directly into improvements and promotion of the area. A number of independent shops have taken advantage of comparatively cheap rents in the side roads off High Street, leading to an influx of boutiques and the start of an (organic) café culture.

Despite being part of Birmingham for over a century – and being closer in size to a town than a suburb – Kings Heath is referred to as a 'village' by some members of the community. A focal point of the suburb is All Saints Square, located at one end of the High Street at the junction of Alcester Road South and Vicarage Road. This was created in the mid-2010s when the churchyard of All Saints' Church was redeveloped into a public square. It is used as the venue for the suburb's monthly farmers' market and other seasonal events.

Residents and businesses hosted the first annual Queens Heath Pride in September 2021 after "The Gayborhood Foundation" named the area one of the world's best 'gayborhoods' alongside the likes of The Castro in San Francisco and The Marais in Paris. The foundation and parade were later revealed to be the brainchild of local resident and comedian Joe Lycett in response to an increase in anti-LGBTQ protests outside schools in Birmingham. Even after this fact was revealed, Queens Heath Pride continues to take place annually on York Road.

== Education ==
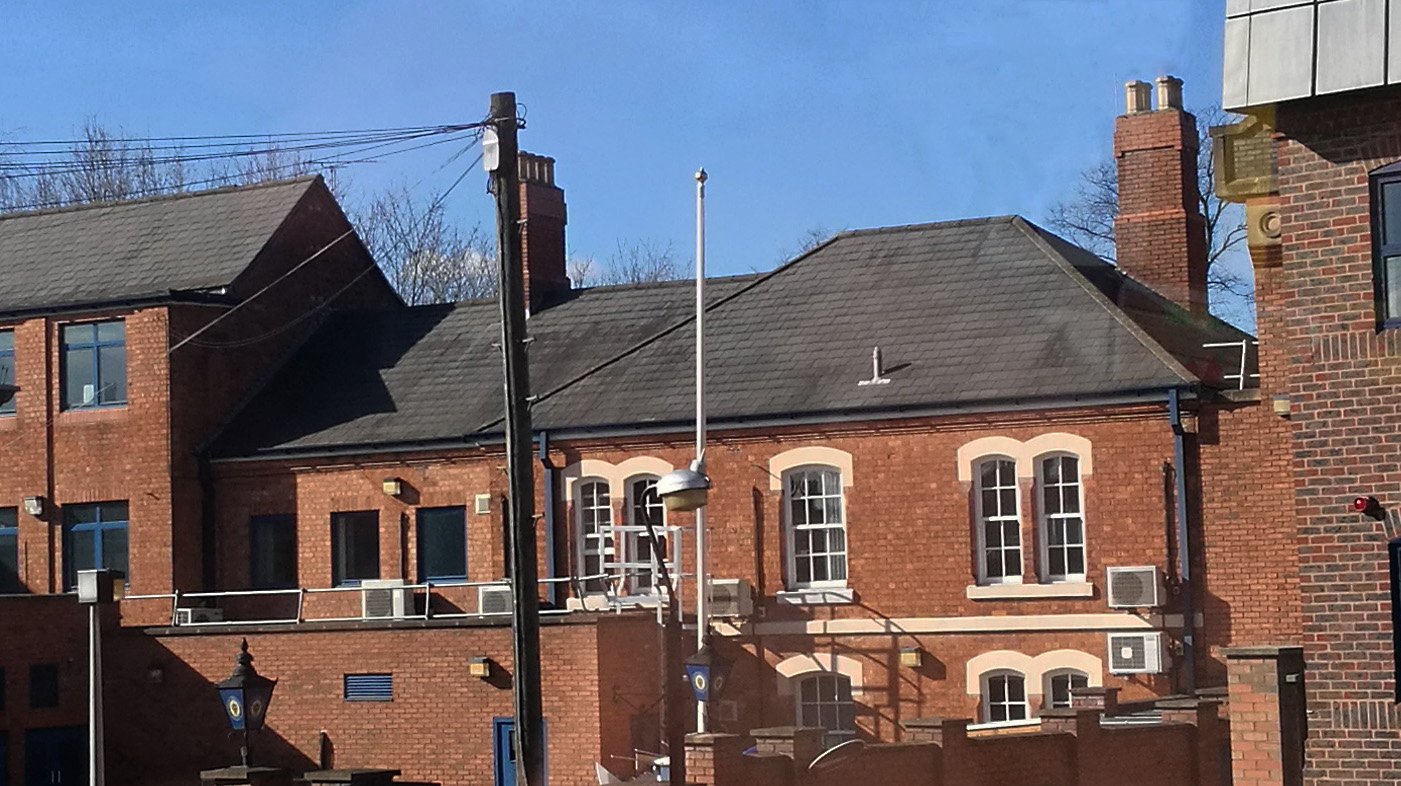
Kings Heath Police Station

Kings Heath has several notable schools including Kings Heath Secondary School, Wheelers Lane Technology College, King Edward VI Camp Hill School for Boys, King Edward VI Camp Hill School for Girls, and Bishop Challoner Catholic College.

== Transport ==
Kings Heath sits on the Camp Hill line, with services from Kings Heath station, and is also served by bus routes 11A/C, 27, 35, 50, 50A, 76 and 150. Buses are operated by National Express West Midlands (11A/C, 35, 50 and 76) and Diamond (27, 50, 50A, 150)

The Camp Hill line opened on 7 April 2026, bringing three new stations to the local area: Pineapple Road, Kings Heath, and Moseley Village, with two trains per hour in each direction between Kings Norton and Birmingham New Street. The business case has been opened to explore the feasibility of a fourth station to be rebuilt at the historic Brighton Road station site, as Balsall Heath.

== Community facilities ==
The central shopping area runs along High Street and Alcester Road, and the shops include branches of national chain stores, independent bakeries, butchers and greengrocers, charity shops, supermarkets, electrical retailers and opticians. There are also a number of pubs, churches and schools on and around High Street.

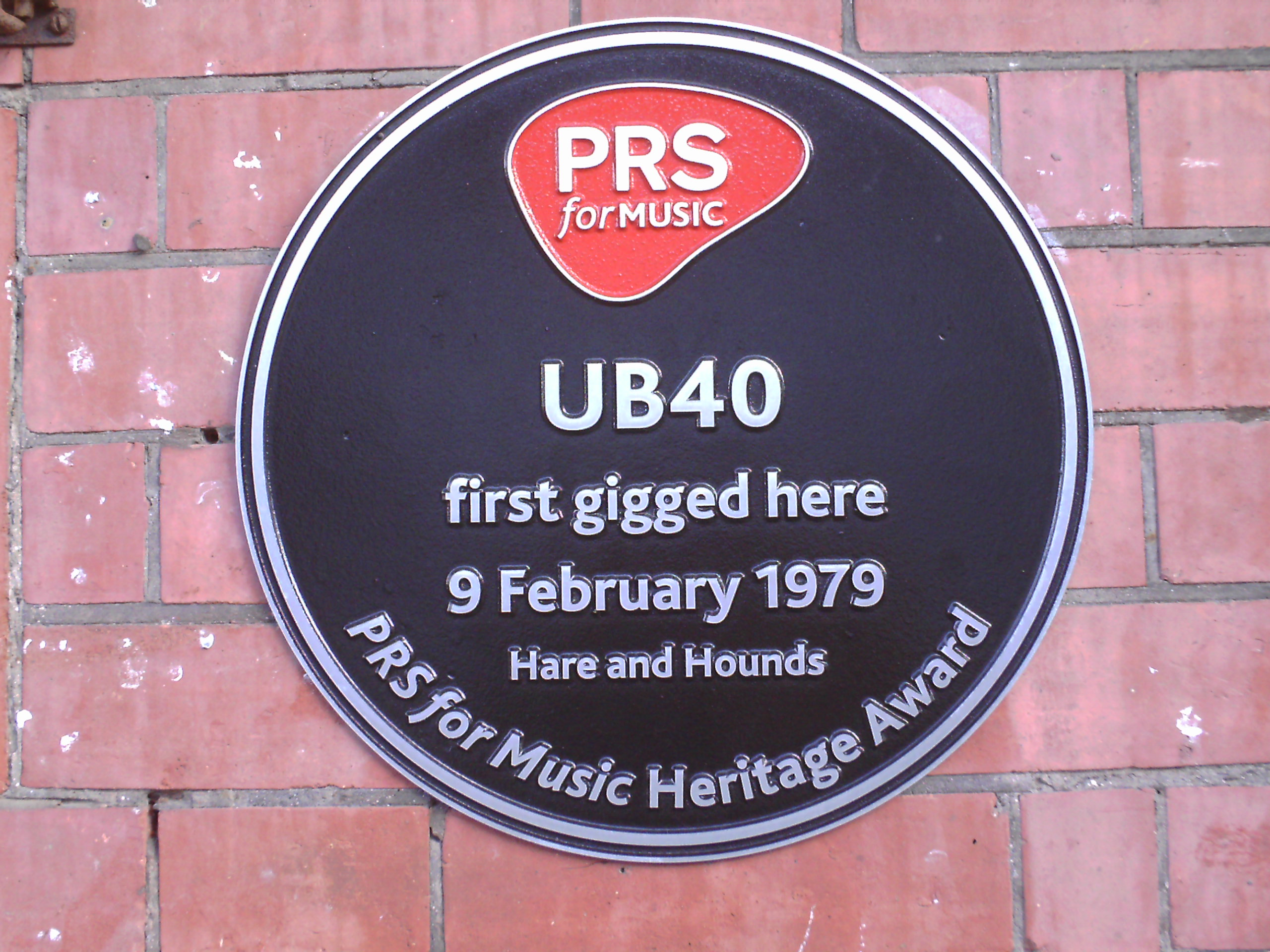
Plaque marking UB40's first gig.

Kings Heath has one park, Kings Heath Park, which is famous as the setting for the popular ATV series Gardening Today. Kings Heath Park has "Green Flag" status. It features a Victorian-styled tea room and is the venue for the Royal Horticultural Society's annual Gardener's Weekend Show, which is one of the top regional events for gardening enthusiasts to show off their vegetables, floral displays, etc.

The Hare & Hounds public house, in Kings Heath High Street, was the location of the first concert by UB40 on 9 February 1979, which is commemorated by a PRS for Music plaque. The pub was rebuilt in 1907, but is grade II listed, as it has retained many original Art Nouveau internal fixtures. The pub is still an important local music venue.

== Sport and leisure ==
Kings Heath Stadium was a greyhound track that existed from 1927 until its closure in 1971. The site was first developed in 1923 at Alcester Lane's End on the southern outskirts of Kings Heath as the venue for the annual Kings Heath Horse Show. The ground was converted to include a greyhound track and the first race took place on 21 May 1927. After the Horse Show moved elsewhere in the 1960s, the ground was exclusively used for greyhound racing until being permanently closed in 1971. The land was eventually sold for housing development.

An 18-hole golf course opened in 1926 just to the south of the race track along the Alcester Road. This is also the site of the modern Cocks Moors Woods sports and leisure centre, the largest of its kind in south Birmingham.

Kings Heath Baths was an indoor facility on Institute Road that first opened on 15 August 1923. For many years, the swimming pool was drained and floored over during the winter so it could be used as a dance hall, with additional badminton courts also provided. The baths closed in 1987 and the building was subsequently demolished.

The Kingsway Cinema opened on High Street in March 1925 and remained open for more than fifty years until its closure in May 1980. The cinema was later converted into a bingo hall, first run by Essoldo Bingo, then Gala Bingo, but eventually closed in 2007. The building was largely destroyed by a fire on 17 September 2011. It was auctioned off in 2016 to a local building development company and demolition work was carried out at the rear of the building in early 2018. The Grade A locally listed facade at the front was largely unaffected by the 2011 fire and the redevelopment plans include restoring this to its former state.

== Governance ==
Kings Heath lies in the ward of Brandwood and Kings Heath, and is represented by two Green Party councillors on Birmingham City Council, Jordan Phillip and Hamzah Sheikh, both elected in 2026.

Kings Heath is in the parliamentary constituency of Birmingham Hall Green and Moseley, represented by Labour MP Tahir Ali.

== Notable residents ==
=== People born in Kings Heath ===
- Tommy Green (1873–1921), footballer who played for West Bromwich Albion
- Sydney S. Guy (1885–1971), founder of Guy Motors
- Albert Gardner (1887–1923), footballer who played for Birmingham City
- Frank Bowden (1904–?), footballer who played for Birmingham City and Coventry City
- Edna Iles (1905–2003), classical pianist
- Jim Roberts (1922–2019), architect whose works included the Rotunda in central Birmingham
- Peter Aldis (1927–2008), footballer who played for Aston Villa
- Ann Jones (born 1938), tennis player who won eight Grand Slam Championships
- Martin Barre (born 1946), guitarist for Jethro Tull
- Dave Latchford (born 1948), footballer who played for Birmingham City
- Bob Latchford (born 1951), footballer who played for Birmingham City, Everton and England
- Peter Latchford (born 1952), footballer who played for West Bromwich Albion and Celtic
- Toyah Willcox (born 1958), musician and actress
- Garry Thompson (born 1959), footballer who played for Coventry City, West Bromwich Albion and Aston Villa
- Dave Linney (born 1961), footballer who played for Oxford United
- Gary Childs (born 1964), footballer for Walsall and Grimsby Town
- Kevin Ashley (born 1968), footballer who played for Birmingham City and Wolverhampton Wanderers
- Laura Mvula (born 1986), soul singer/songwriter

=== Notable residents ===
- J. R. R. Tolkien (1892–1973) moved to Kings Heath to live with his grandparents in 1895
- Anthony E. Pratt (1903–1994), inventor of the board game Cluedo
- Tommy Godwin (1920–2012), international cyclist who ran a cycle shop in Kings Heath from 1950 to 1986
- Judith Cutler (born 1946), crime fiction writer
- Stuart Linnell (born 1947 in Northfield, Birmingham), radio and TV presenter
- Trevor Burton (born 1949), guitarist and founding member of The Move
- Paul Dyson (born 1959), footballer for Coventry City and Stoke City who ran a sports shop in Kings Heath after his retirement
- Salma Yaqoob (born 1971), politician and psychotherapist
- Joe Lycett (born 1988), comedian, moved from Hall Green, promotes Kings Heath as a gay village, hosts annual pride events.

== In popular culture ==
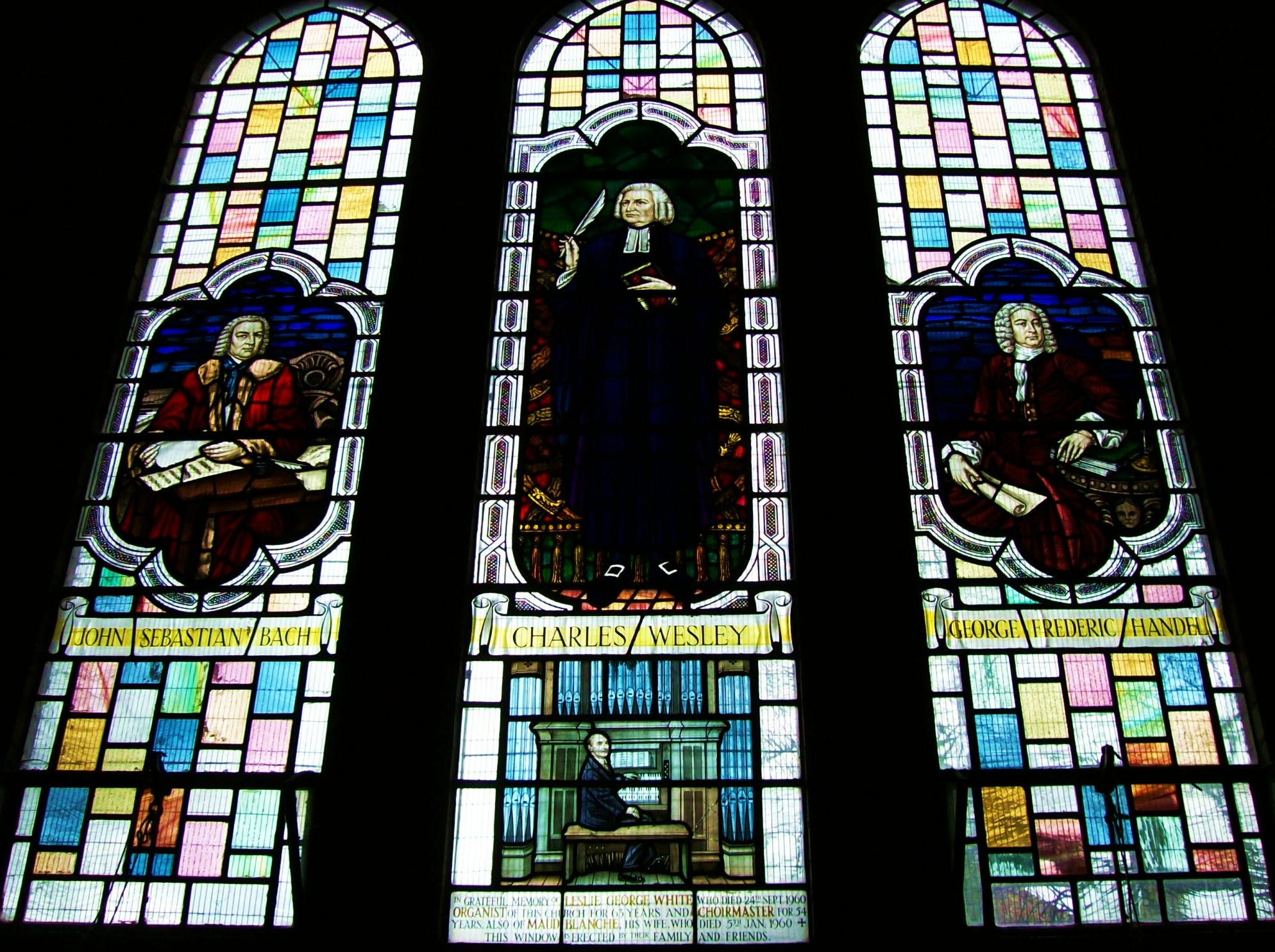
The church musicians window; Kings Heath Methodist Church; featuring Bach, Charles Wesley, Handel and the local organist Leslie Wright

The 2011 musical film Turbulence was shot in the area, with much of the film's action taking place in the Hare & Hounds pub.

The 2013 song "Green Garden" by Birmingham born Laura Mvula is an elegy to her home in Kings Heath.

The BBC documentary Fighting For Air, about suburban air pollution, was filmed in Kings Heath in 2017 and broadcast on BBC2 on 10 January 2018.

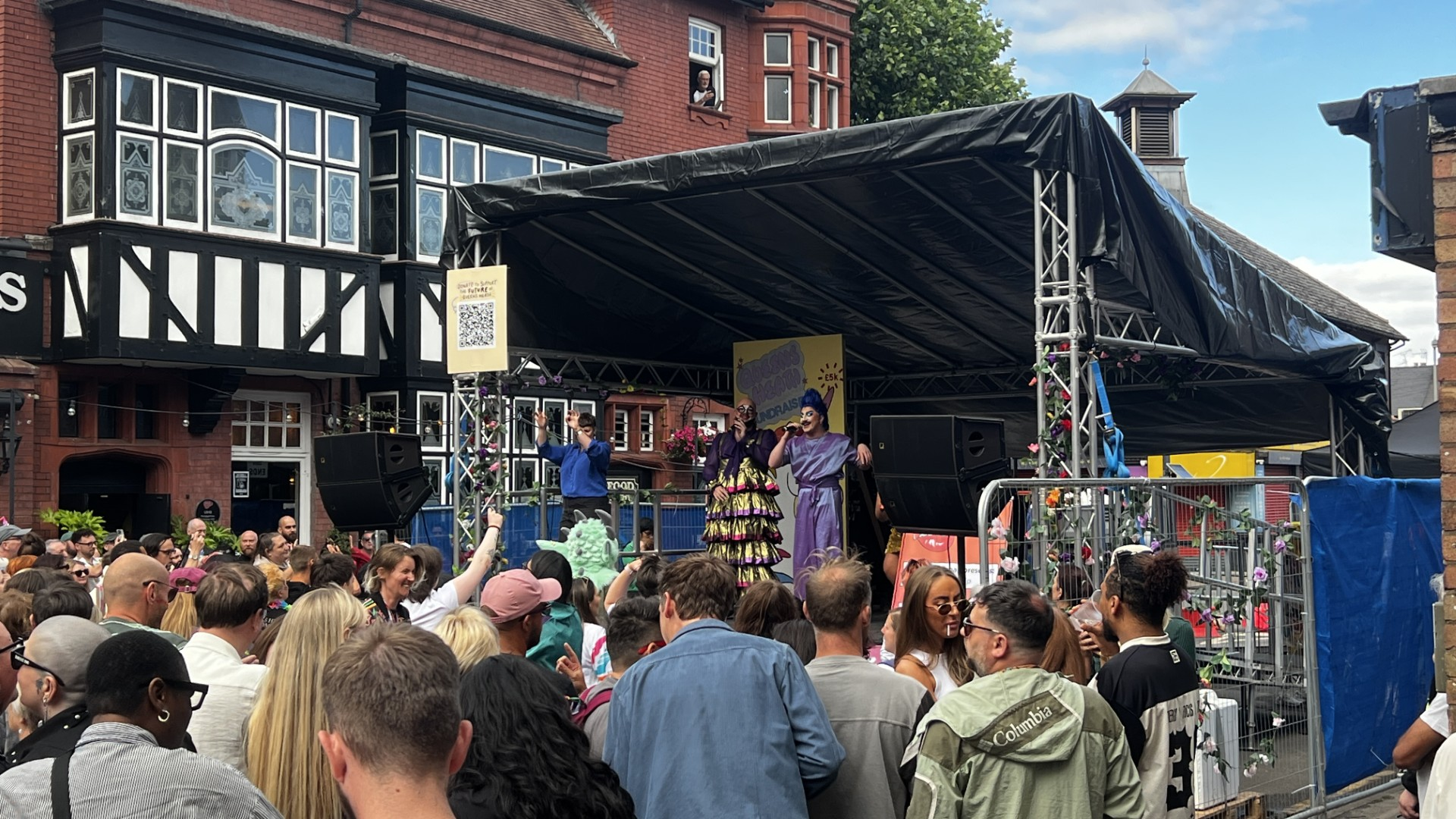
Queens Heath Pride 2025 (6 July)

In 2021, Birmingham-born comedian Joe Lycett promoted Kings Heath as a 'gay village'. This became a pride event and "Queens Heath Pride" runs annually on York Road and Heathfield Road.

== See also ==
- Brandwood Ward
- Moseley and Kings Heath Ward
