= Greet, Birmingham =

Coordinates: 52.456°N 1.859°W

Greet (grid reference SP100841) is a historical area in south Birmingham, England, around modern Sparkhill.

== History ==
Now a name obsolete in addresses, Greet, meaning "gravel" (grit)", was one of the medieval manors around Birmingham on the eastern gravelly slopes of the sandstone ridge which runs through central Birmingham. The manor was a timber-framed house, first mentioned in 1562, with the majority of the surrounding land being owned by Studley Priory. This land had been given to the priory by William de Edricheston in 1254, soon after he had acquired it. The land remained in the ownership of the Priory until 1545 when it was sold to Clement Throckmorton and Sir Alexander Avenon, an ironmonger who would later become Lord Mayor of London. Avenon gave the land to his son and wife in 1570, before dying in 1580. In 1586, his son, Alexander, pledged his manor to cover a debt which he owed to a Thomas Starkey, and in the same year sold the reversion to James Banks, who sold it in 1601 to Henry Greswolde. Greswolde died in 1602 and left Greet to his eldest son, George, who was just thirteen years old at the time. Dorothy, widow of Henry, continued to live at Greet manor, having purchased from Joan, widow of Thomas Starkey, her interest in the manor.

George Greswolde died in 1612, and was succeeded by his brother Humphrey. He died in 1660, and was succeeded in turn by his two sons Humphrey, who died in 1671, and Henry, who died in 1700, leaving four sons. These were: Humphrey who died unmarried in 1712, Henry who left a daughter Anne, Marshal and John. In 1776, Henry Greswolde Lewis, held a third. The other two thirds were held, in 1784, by William Richard Wilson and Jane Anne Eleanor, his wife, who appear to have given up their share to Henry Greswolde Lewis. He was succeeded in 1829 by his kinsman, Edmund Meysey Wigley, who assumed the name Greswolde and died unmarried in 1833. On his death, Henry Wigley, who also assumed the name Greswolde, became tenant for life under the will of Henry Greswolde Lewis, and he and his son, Edmund Greswolde, who was tenant in line, barred the estate in tail and conveyed the estates to the use of Henry Greswolde for life, with remainder to Edmund Greswolde in fee simple. Edmund died in 1836, and on his death, his father succeeded to the estates in fee simple under the will of Edmund.

Situated next to Wake Green, Greet gave its name to Greet Common (upon which now stands Moseley School), and the now lost Greet Mill (grid reference SP099827), at the point where the A34 road crosses the River Cole between Sparkhill and Hall Green. Greet Mill was the water mill 1 km. north (downstream) of Sarehole Mill and was first mentioned in 1275. Another mill was also located in Greet, called Lower Greet Mill, which was first mentioned in 1725.

== Politics ==
Greet is part of the Birmingham Hall Green and Moseley parliamentary constituency.

== Sources ==
- Victor Skipp (1980). A History of Greater Birmingham – down to 1830. Victor Skipp. ISBN 0-9506998-0-2.
- British History Online: A History of the County of Worcester: volume 3 - Parishes: Yardley
