= Sarehole =

Area in Hall Green, Birmingham, England

Coordinates: 52.43409°N 1.85581°W

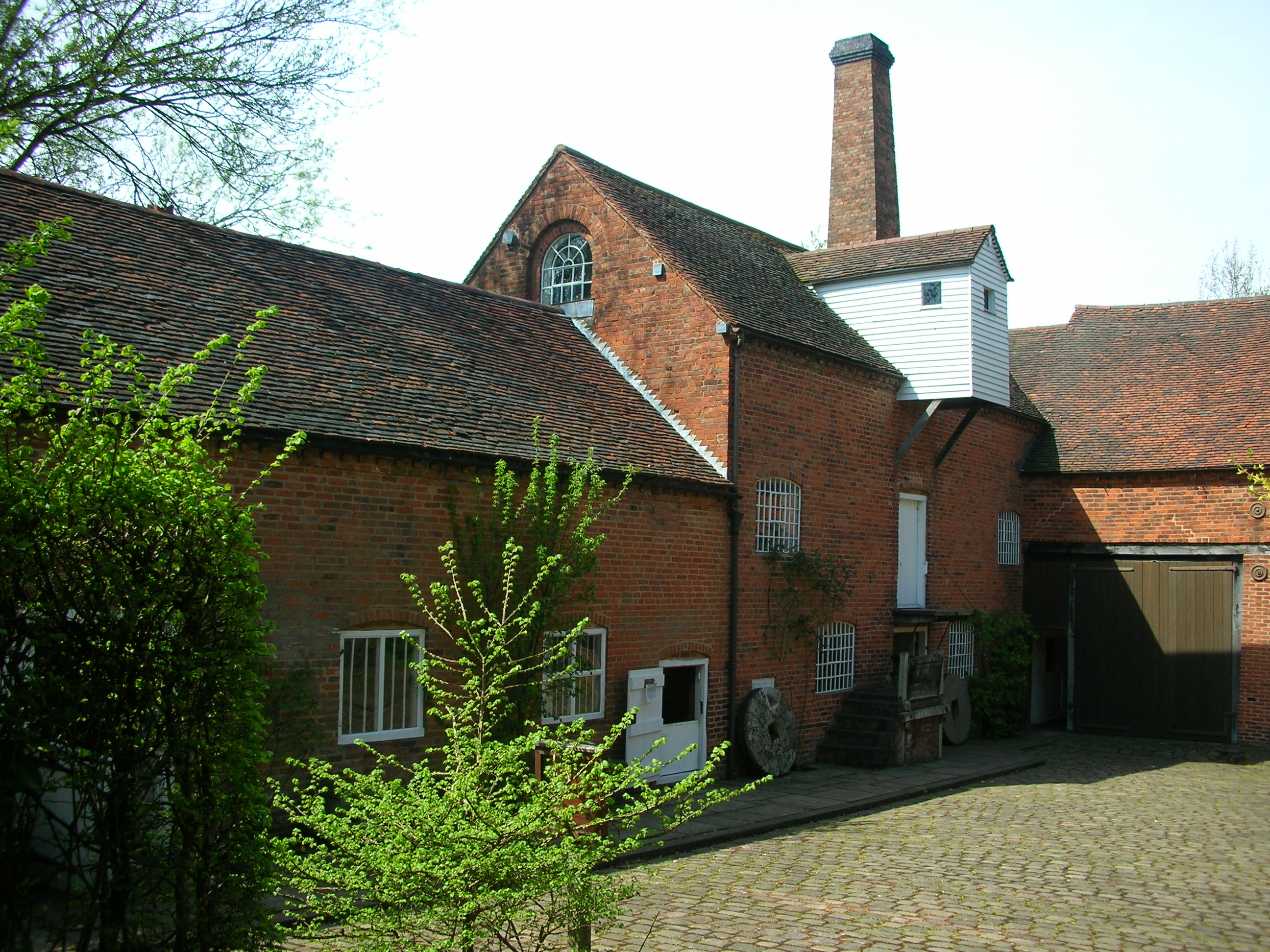
Sarehole Mill

Sarehole (grid reference SP099818) is an area in Hall Green, Birmingham, England. Historically in Worcestershire, it was a small hamlet in the larger parish, and manor, of Yardley, which was transferred to Birmingham in 1911. Birmingham was classed as part of Warwickshire until 1974, and since then has been part of the West Midlands.

W. H. Duignan's Worcestershire Place Names conjectures that the name derives from Old English Syrfe, "Service tree", and hyll, "Hill".

Sarehole gave its name to a farm (now built over) and a mill. It extended from the ford at Green Lane (now Green Road), southwards for about a mile, along the River Cole to the Dingles. Birmingham City Council has named the segment of the path along the Cole southwards from Sarehole Mill the John Morris Jones Walkway after a local historian.

J. R. R. Tolkien lived here as a child in the 1890s. The area influenced his description of the green and peaceful country of the Shire in his books. The nearby Moseley Bog (now a nature reserve) may have been the inspiration for the Old Forest. Tolkien stated:

It was a kind of lost paradise. There was an old mill that really did grind corn with two millers, a great big pond with swans on it, a sandpit, a wonderful dell with flowers, a few old-fashioned village houses and, further away, a stream with another mill. I always knew it would go – and it did.

According to local legend, the hill on which Spring Hill College stands is criss-crossed with secret tunnels and could easily have become Tolkien's Bag End. Sarehole Mill, which also influenced the young Tolkien, is a water-driven mill, now a museum, within the Shire Country Park. During the 18th century the mill was leased by Matthew Boulton, one of the pioneers of the Industrial Revolution and leading figure of the Lunar Society, for scientific experimentation.

== Sources ==
- Hall Green and Hereabout, John Morris Jones, ed. Michael Byrne 1989, (Birmingham Libraries Catalogue)
- Here and Then – The Past of Our District, John Morris Jones, (Birmingham Libraries Catalogue)
