= Wake Green =

Area of Birmingham, England

Coordinates: 52.43861°N 1.87639°W

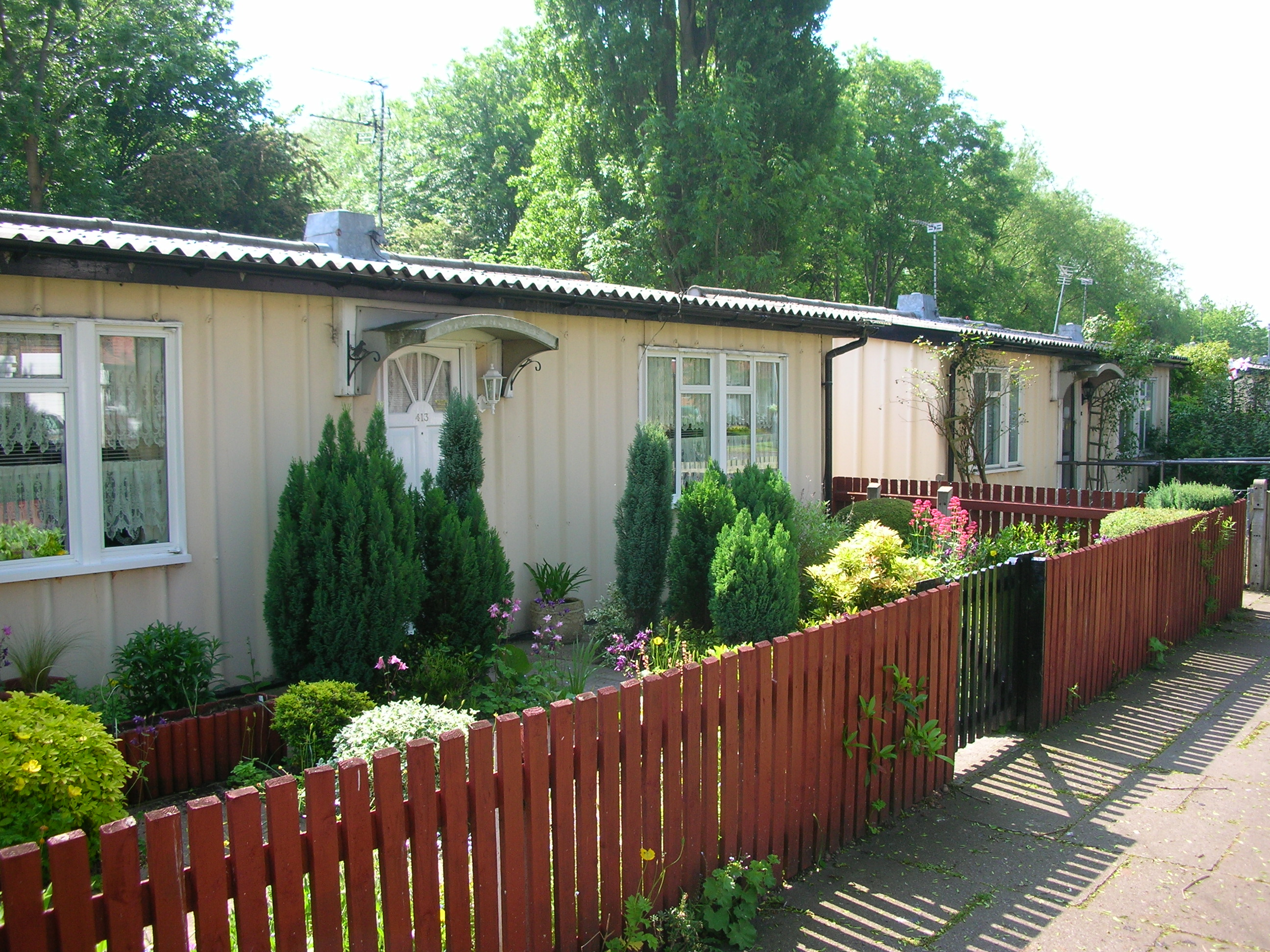
Phoenix prefabs, 1945, on Wake Green Road

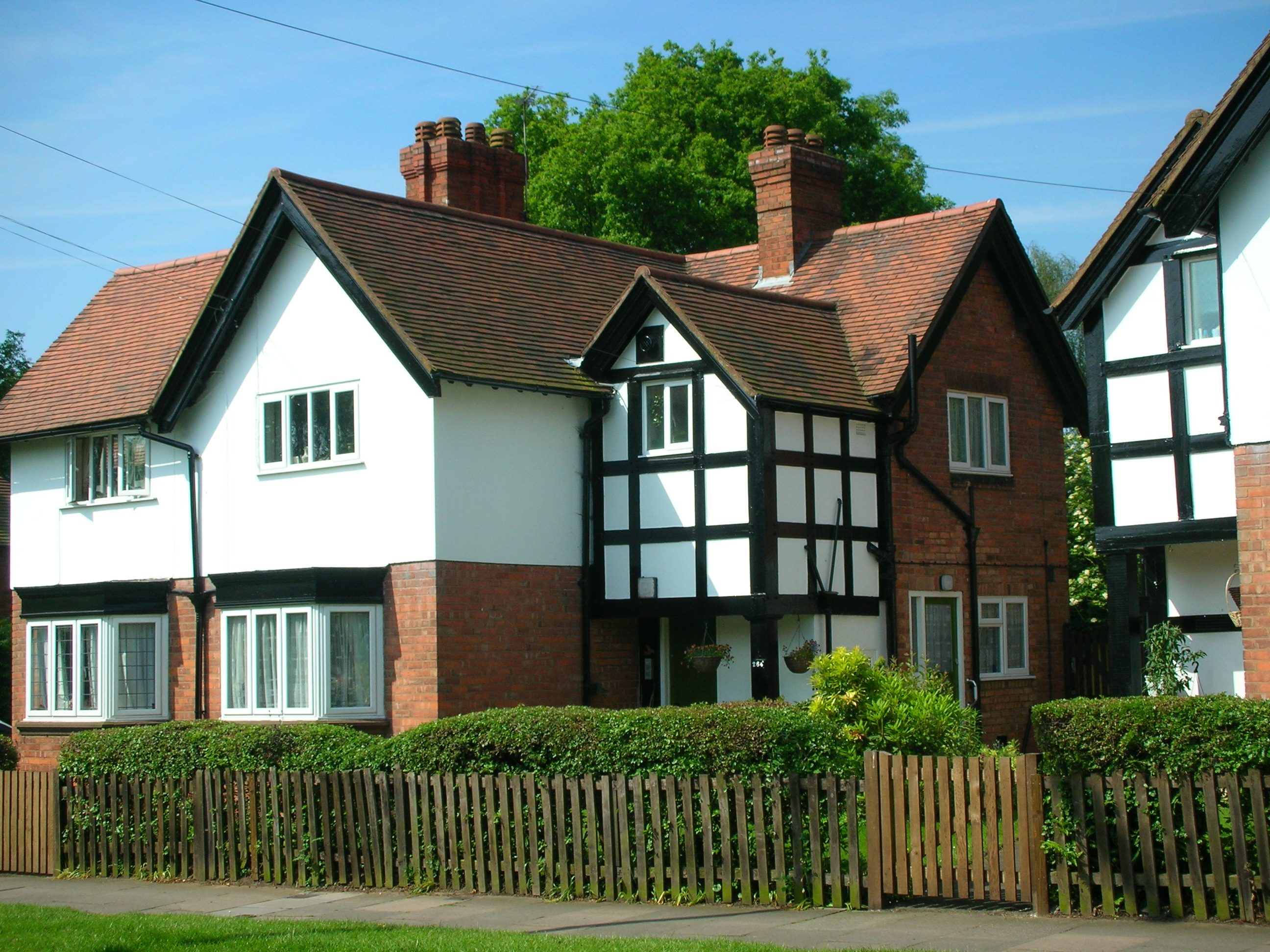
First English home of J. R. R. Tolkien, aged 4–8

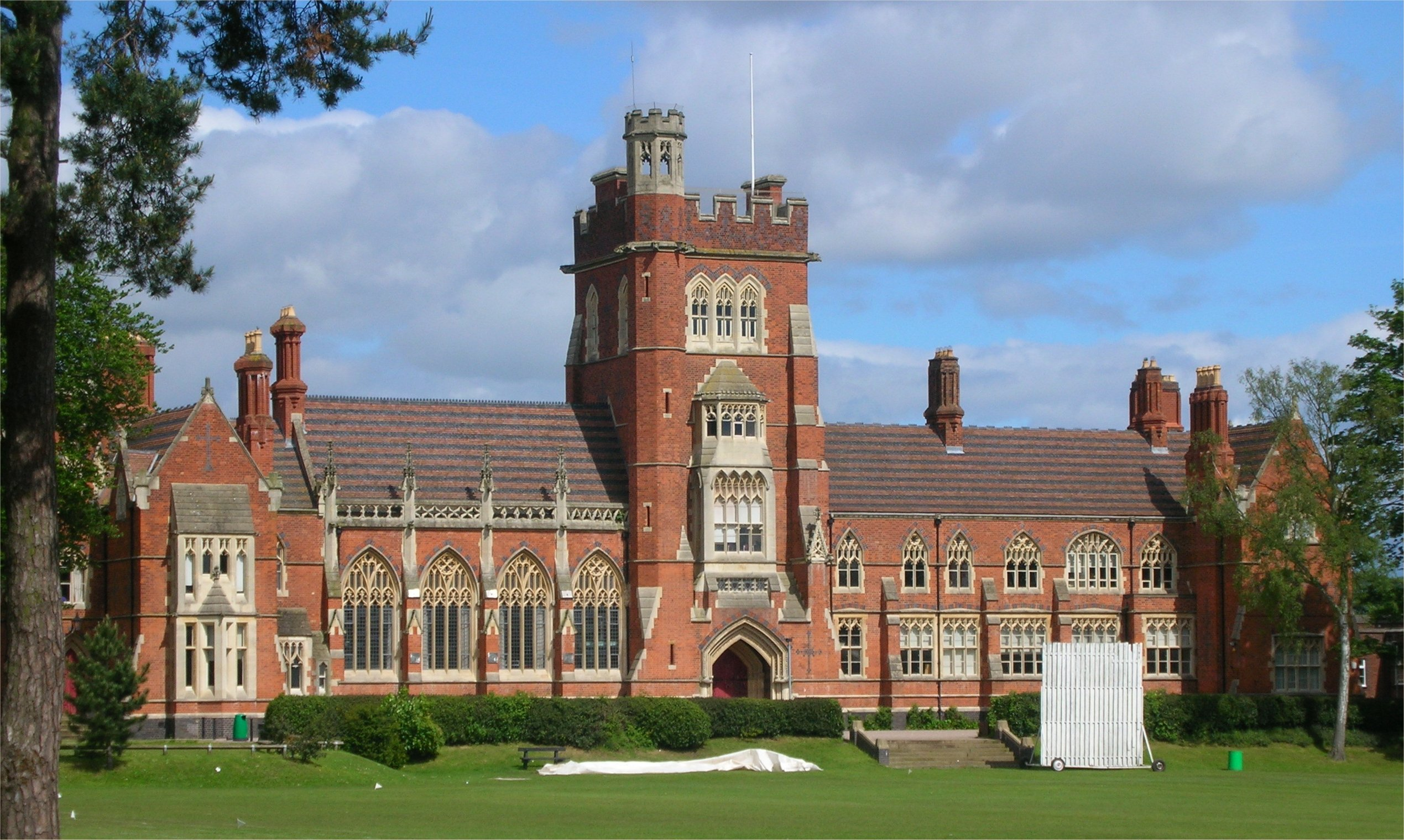
Moseley School

Wake Green (grid reference SP085823) is a historical area in south Birmingham, England between Moseley, Kings Heath, and Hall Green.

Like nearby Sarehole it is no longer a postal address. It used to straddle the parish boundary of Yardley (Worcestershire at the time) and Kings Norton and was an area of "waste land", that is, land which had not yet been cultivated. In the past it had a post mill (windmill) – Wake Green Mill – mentioned in a deed of 1664 when it was in the possession of Richard Grevis. This was just above what is now Moseley Bog.

As the outskirts of Birmingham became built upon around the turn of the twentieth century, Wake Green disappeared beneath the growing "villages" of Moseley and Kings Heath, eventually becoming the centre of a new parish of Saint Agnes, Moseley (now a conservation area). Its name lives on in Wake Green Road.

== Wake Green Road ==
Wake Green Road runs from the centre of Moseley for about two miles to the south east. It has several listed buildings along it:

- four early 20th century houses (two of them in the St. Agnes conservation area)
- Moseley School, also known as Spring Hill College
- a row of sixteen listed single storey Phoenix prefabs, built 1945 under the Housing (Temporary Accommodation) Act, and still occupied

It also has the house J. R. R. Tolkien first lived in (the Gracewell cottages) when he came to England at the age of four, in a hamlet then called Sarehole, opposite Sarehole Mill.
