= John Morris Jones Walkway =

Footpath in Birmingham, England

Coordinates: 52.43409°N 1.85581°W

John Morris Jones Walkway (grid reference SP099818) is a path on the River Cole in Hall Green, Birmingham, England (in an area once called Sarehole). It is part of the Shire Country Park.

John Morris Jones was a headmaster of George Dixon Junior School in west Birmingham from 1960 to 1980. He wrote extensively about the local history of the South Birmingham area, particularly Yardley, Hall Green and Sarehole.

== See also ==
- Hall Green and Hereabout, John Morris JONES, ed. Michael Byrne 1989, (Birmingham Libraries Catalogue)
- Here and Then - The past of Our District, John Morris JONES, (Birmingham Libraries Catalogue)
