= Shire Country Park =

Park south of Birmingham, England

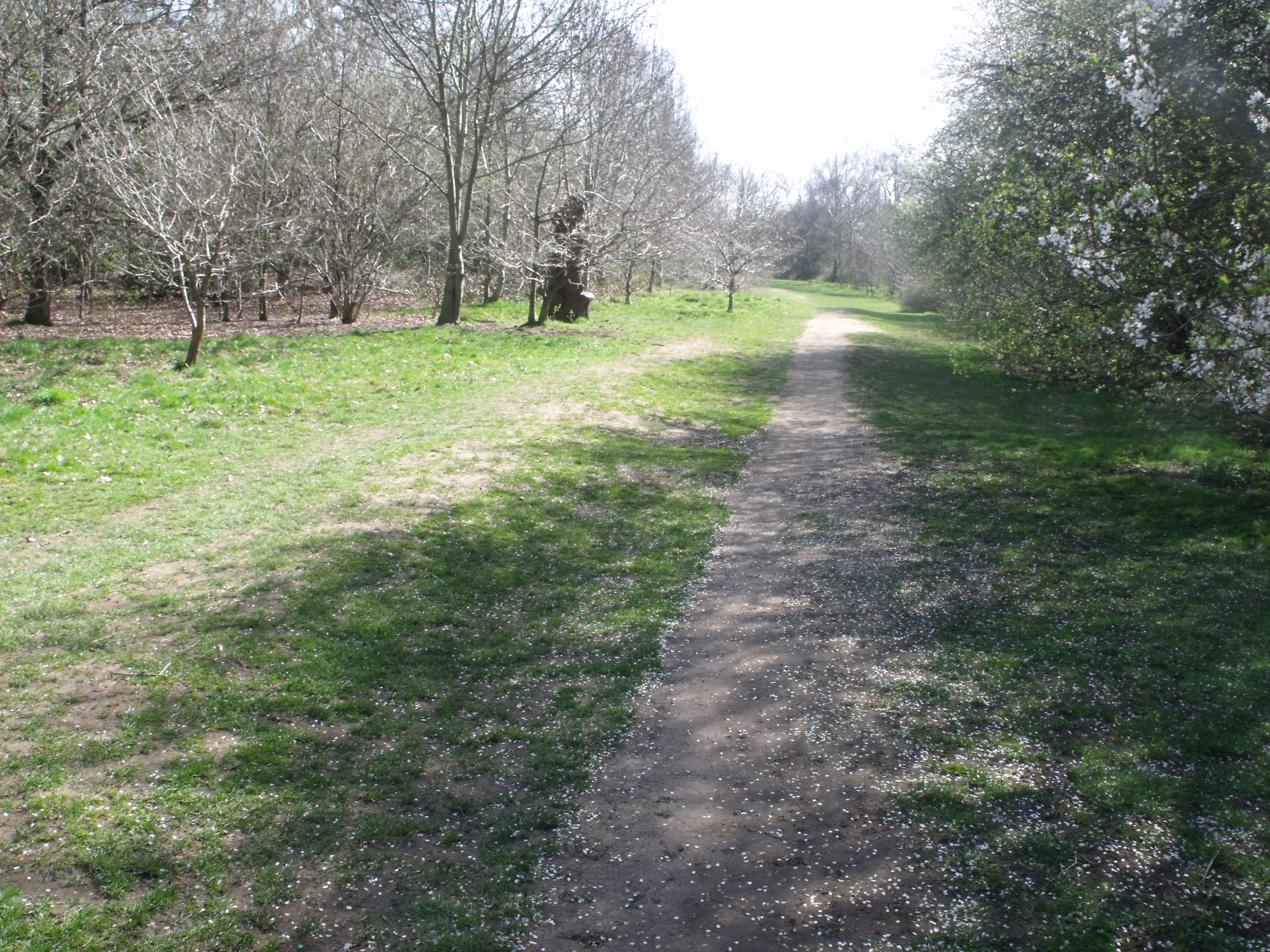
- Interactive map of Shire Country Park
- Location: Birmingham, England
- Coordinates: 52°26′03″N 1°51′21″W
- Operator: Birmingham City Council
- Website: www.birmingham.gov.uk/shirecountrypark

The Shire Country Park (grid reference SP099818) is a country park in the south of Birmingham, England, taking its name from Tolkien's The Shire.

It consists of the Millstream Way following the course of the River Cole from Yardley Wood to Small Heath and includes the following sites: Scribers Lane SINC, Trittiford Mill Pool, The Dingles, Chinn Brook Recreation Ground, Sarehole Mill Recreation Ground, Moseley Bog LNR, Burbury Brickworks, The John Morris Jones Walkway and Cocksmoor BMX.

== History ==
River Cole's race to Sarehole Mill formerly went under Brook Lane in a culvert, but this has been blocked and the line of the race is lost to northward. The spillway from race to river is seen to be still there, and the slots for the removable plank weir can be seen. The riverside walk continues as the John Morris Jones Walkway past the site of Robin Hood Lane ford, across Cotterills Meadow which has been Colebank Playing Field for the last ninety years until it reaches the Grade II Listed water mill, Sarehole Mill at Hall Green. The Coldbath Brook, a tributary of the Cole, drives the mill which is now a museum and one of the inspirations for J. R. R. Tolkien's The Lord of the Rings. The Shire Country Park ranger office is located at Sarehole Mill.

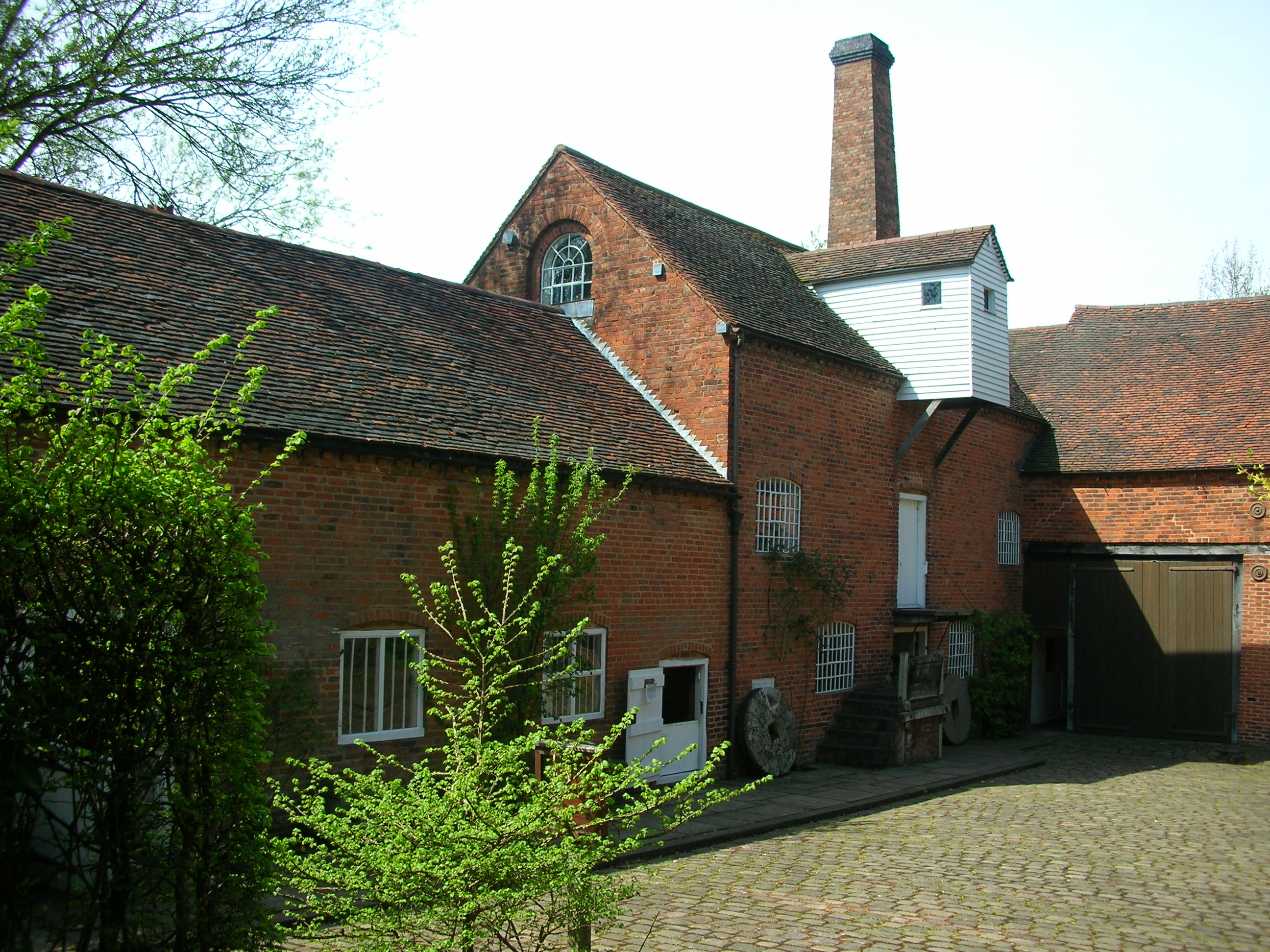
Sarehole Mill

Tolkien and his brother spent their childhood in Birmingham with their widowed mother. They first lived in the hamlet of Sarehole, which Tolkien said were the happiest years of his youth. Sarehole is said to have been the model for The Shire, home to the hobbits. Every year the Tolkien Weekend is held at Sarehole Recreation Ground and Moseley Bog Local Nature Reserve part of the Shire Country Park. 2005 commemorated the 50th anniversary of the release of The Lord of the Rings. Ronald and his brother spent many hours playing around Sarehole Mill and being chased away by the miller's son. The Mill features in The Hobbit when Bilbo Baggins runs "as fast as his furry feet could carry him down the lane, past the great Mill, across The Water and then on for a mile or more." In the 1960s Tolkien contributed to a public appeal to restore the mill which had become dilapidated. It is now a museum and is the only surviving water mill in the city's ownership.

Continuing to Green Lane ford which, like those at Slade and Scribers Lane, has been concreted and the wooden footbridge is the latest of many, earlier ones have been swept away by sudden torrents. When the meadow below Green Road was opened as part of the riverside walk in the 1960s, the Cole was re-coursed and two weirs topped by step-stones were installed. Next, the river crosses the A34, Stratford Road, the site of the former 13th-century Greet Mill, whose pool was the ponded river. In 1914 two brick bridges, over the river channel and a flood-race, were replaced by a two-arched brick bridge with a stone balustrade which allowed tramcars to cross the river and go on to Hall Green. The mill went out of use about 1843, was demolished and forgotten.

Between Stratford Road and Formans Road, known in the 14th century as Foulemoreslone and which used the Fole- or Fullford (foul ford) the stretch is known as Blackberry Way, being named after consultation with local residents and highly suitable, as this is one of the best blackberry picking sections of The Shire Country Park.

The river is bridged by the A41, Warwick Road at Greet, there is no documentary evidence for a ford here, and then continues north, passing under the Grand Union Canal and the Chiltern Main Line railway at Hay Mills close to the Ackers trust outdoor pursuits centre.
