= Douglas Haig (disambiguation) =

Douglas Haig, 1st Earl Haig (1861–1928) was a British soldier and senior commander during World War I.

Douglas Haig may also refer to:

- Douglas Haig (actor) (1920–2011), American actor
- Club Atlético Douglas Haig, an Argentine football club founded in 1918

== See also ==
- Douglas Hague (1926–2015), British economist
