= George Dixon Academy =

Location
- Portland Road/City Road; Birmingham, West Midlands, B16 9GD; England, UK
- Coordinates: 52.47743°N 1.9556°W

Information
- Type: Academy
- Motto: A Posse ad Esse
- Religious affiliation: Multicultural
- Established: 1906
- Founder: George Dixon
- Local authority: Birmingham
- Department for Education URN: 138695 Tables
- Ofsted: Reports
- Head teacher: Claire Bernard and David Horner
- Staff: 100 (approx.)
- Gender: Mixed
- Age: 11 to 16 (17 to 18 for sixth form)
- Enrolment: 1000+
- Hours in school day: 8:45 to 15:30
- Colour
- Website: https://www.georgedixonacademy.com/

George Dixon Academy is a secondary school located on Portland Road and City Road in Edgbaston, Birmingham, England. Former names of the school include George Dixon Higher Grade School, George Dixon Grammar School, George Dixon Community School, George Dixon Grant Maintained School and George Dixon International School. The school operates under a co-headship with Claire Bernard and David Horner serving as co-headteachers since September 2025. Former heads include Tutvinder Mann, Robert Dowling and Anthony Hamilton, a double gold medal paralympian. The school was made in 1888 but the current building has been there since 1906 . The school opens at 8:45 and finishes at 15:30 Mon-Fri.

== History ==
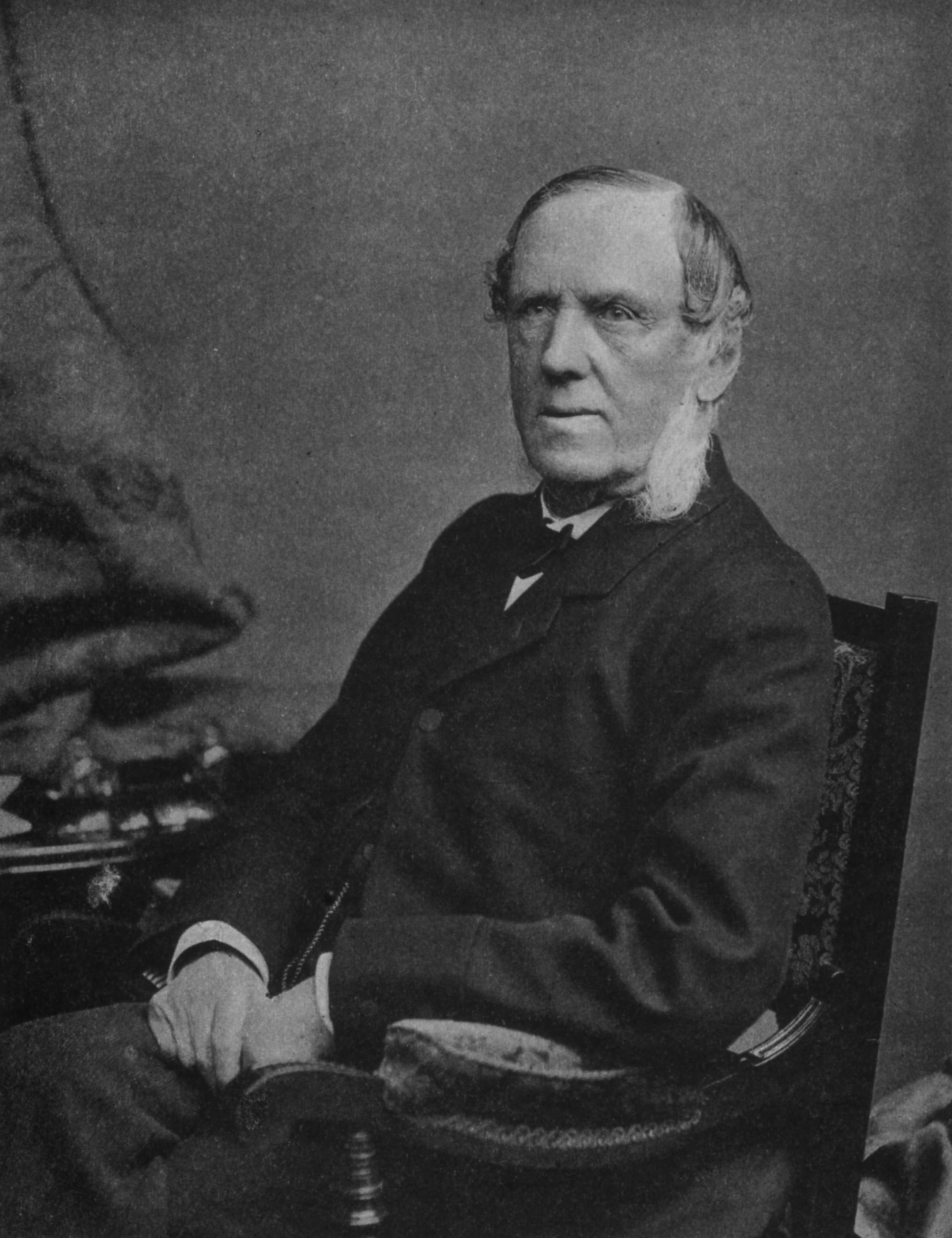
George Dixon

George Dixon (1820–1898) was a councillor, mayor, and MP in Birmingham. One of his first actions after being elected mayor in 1866 was to hold a conference to discuss the lack of education for children. This led to the formation of the Birmingham Education Society in 1867, and the National Education League, which he chaired, in 1869. The League in turn was instrumental in the creation of the Elementary Education Act 1870 (33 & 34 Vict. c. 75) (Forster's Act), leading to the formation of the first school boards in England and Wales.

In 1884, Dixon created Bridge Street Technical School. He bought the old Cadbury's premises, and converted it to a school at his own expense. It taught science and mechanics to 400 boys for two years beyond normal school-leaving age. In 1888 the school was moved to occupy the Oozells Street Board School building, renamed George Dixon Higher Grade School in 1888, and began to include girls. In 1906 the school was rebuilt and renamed once again as George Dixon School after its founder. The new school building included a gymnasium.

In 2002, headteacher Sir Robert Dowling was knighted for "services to special needs education".

The school was re-modelled using funds from the Birmingham City Council's Building Schools for the Future Programme. In September 2012 the school converted to academy status and was renamed George Dixon Academy.

== In popular culture ==
The police officer George Dixon in the television series Dixon of Dock Green (1955–1976) was named after George Dixon. The character first appeared in the film The Blue Lamp (1950), produced by a former pupil of the school, Michael Balcon.

== See also ==
- Category:People educated at George Dixon Academy
- John Morris Jones Walkway, headmaster 1960–1980
