= Hall Green School =

Hall Green Secondary School

Location
- Southam Road; Hall Green; Birmingham, West Midlands, B28 0AA; England; 52.4334°N 1.8491°W

Information
- Type: Academy
- Established: 1964
- Local authority: Birmingham City Council
- Department for Education URN: 137858 Tables
- Ofsted: Reports
- Headteacher: Karen Slater
- Gender: Mixed
- Age: 11 to 15
- Enrolment: 897 as of October 2019
- Website: http://www.hallgreen.bham.sch.uk/

Hall Green School is a mixed secondary school located in the Hall Green area of Birmingham, in the West Midlands of England.

The school was established on its current site in 1964, after moving from the site of Sparkhill Commercial College. Previously a foundation school administered by Birmingham City Council, Hall Green School converted to academy status in February 2012. However the school continues to coordinate with Birmingham City Council for admissions. Hall Green School offers GCSEs and BTECs as programmes of study for pupils.
