= Birmingham Hall Green and Moseley =

UK Parliament constituency (since 2024)

Coordinates: 52.45°N 1.87°W

- Borough constituency for the House of Commons
- Boundaries since 2024
- Boundary of Birmingham Hall Green and Moseley in West Midlands region
- County: West Midlands
- Electorate: 75,781 (2023)
- Major settlements: Birmingham - Hall Green, Moseley, Sparkbrook

Current constituency
- Created: 2024
- Member of Parliament: Tahir Ali (Labour)
- Seats: One
- Created from: Birmingham Hall Green; Birmingham Selly Oak (minor part); Birmingham Yardley (minor part)

Birmingham Hall Green and Moseley is a constituency of the House of Commons in the UK Parliament. Created as a result of the 2023 review of Westminster constituencies, it was first contested at the 2024 general election. It is represented by Labour Party member Tahir Ali, who was MP for Birmingham Hall Green from 2019 to 2024.

The constituency name refers to the Hall Green and Moseley areas of Birmingham.

== Constituency profile ==
The constituency is located within Birmingham to the south-east of the city centre. It contains the neighbourhoods of Hall Green, Moseley, Kings Heath and Sparkbrook.

The south and west of the constituency, including Hall Green, Moseley and Kings Heath, is predominantly suburban. Sparkbrook is more inner-city in character and contains the Balti Triangle, an area with a high concentration of South Asian balti restaurants. Residents of the constituency are generally more deprived and have a lower employment rate than national averages. A majority of residents (54%) are Muslims, primarily of Pakistani origin, and one-quarter of residents are White British. At the most recent city council election in 2026, many seats were swing seats, with the Labour Party losing four of the six seats which they held before the election. Voters in the constituency strongly supported remaining in the European Union in the 2016 referendum, with an estimated 65% opposing Brexit.

== Boundaries ==
The constituency is composed of the following:

- The City of Birmingham wards of: Brandwood & King's Heath (polling districts BKH1HG, BKH2HG and BKH3); Hall Green North; Hall Green South; Moseley; Sparkbrook & Balsall Heath East; Sparkhill.

After adjusting the boundaries to take into account the revised ward structure in the City of Birmingham with effect from May 2018, the new constituency comprises 90% of the former Birmingham Hall Green constituency; the Balsall Heath West ward was transferred to Birmingham Ladywood.

Birmingham Hall Green and Moseley includes the City of Birmingham suburbs of Hall Green, King's Heath, Moseley, Sparkbrook, Sparkhill, Springfield, Wake Green and eastern parts of Balsall Heath.

== Members of Parliament ==
Election	Member	Party
2024	Tahir Ali	Labour

== Elections ==
=== Elections in the 2020s ===
General election 2024: Birmingham Hall Green and Moseley
Party	Candidate	Votes	%	±%
Labour	Tahir Ali	12,798	30.8	▼35.5
Independent	Shakeel Afsar	7,142	17.2	new
Independent	Mohammad Hafeez	6,159	14.8	new
Liberal Democrats	Izzy Knowles	4,711	11.3	▲4.1
Green	Zain Ahmed	3,913	9.4	▲7.7
Conservative	Henry Morris	3,845	9.2	▼5.8
Reform	Stephen McBrine	2,305	5.5	▲3.6
Independent	Babar Raja	733	1.8	new
Majority		5,656	13.6	▼36.3
Turnout		41,606	54.1	▼14.2
Labour win (new seat)				

== See also ==
- Birmingham Hall Green prior to 2024
- Parliamentary constituencies in the West Midlands (county)
- List of parliamentary constituencies in West Midlands (region)
