= Robert Dowling (teacher) =

Sir Robert Dowling (born 1940) is a British schoolteacher and headmaster in the city of Birmingham, England.

He is known for preventing secondary school George Dixon Academy from closing, and was made a Knight Bachelor in the 2002 Birthday Honours, "For services to Special Needs Education".

In 2005, he was praised by OFSTED for his role in dealing with issues of sex and morality in his school.

He was Headmaster of St George's School, Edgbaston, Birmingham, subsequently becoming Chairman of the school's board of trustees.
