= Moseley School =

Moseley School and Sixth Form

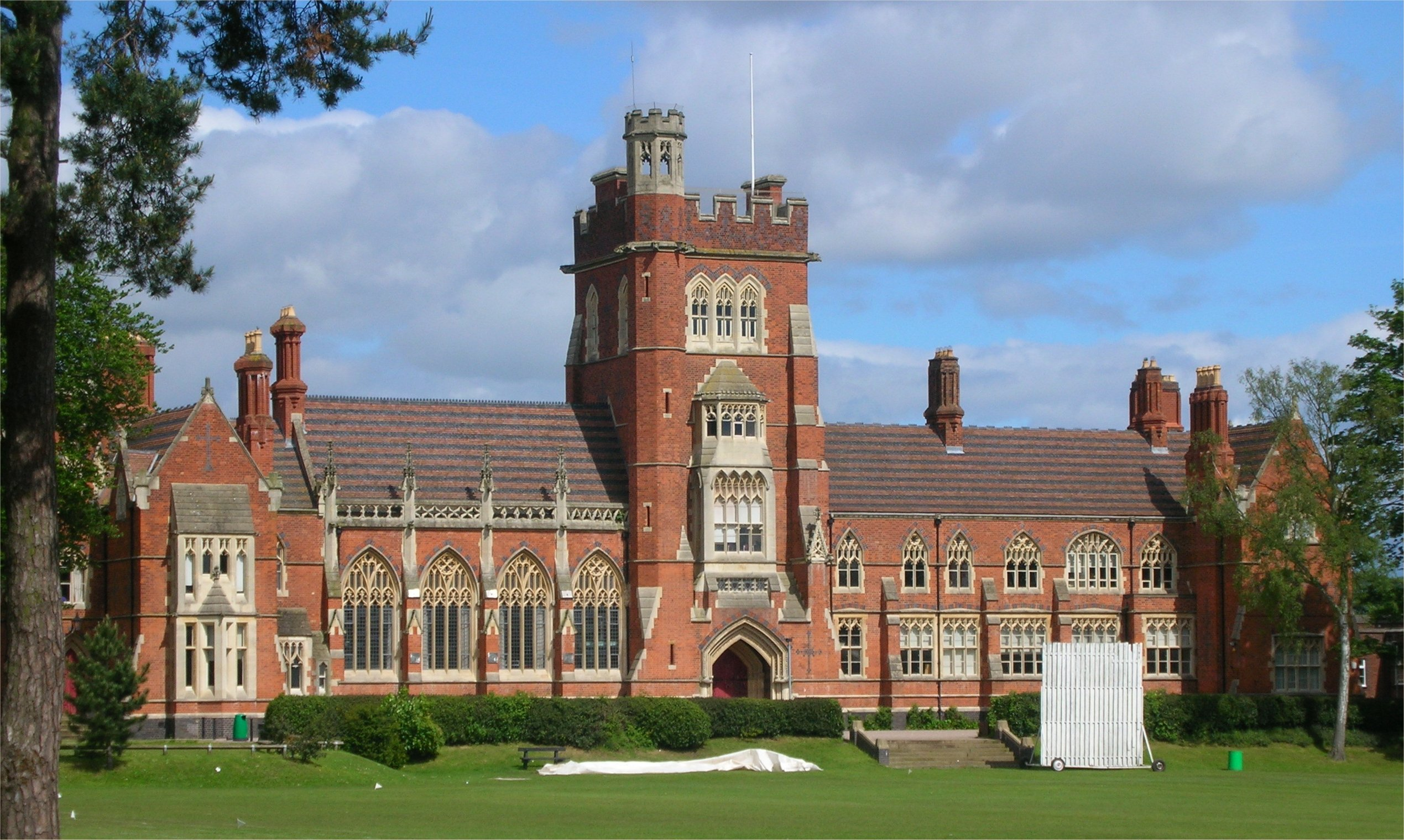

Location
- Wake Green Road; Moseley; Birmingham, West Midlands, B13 9UU; England; 52.4406°N 1.8642°W

Information
- Former names: Moseley Grammar School; Moseley Modern School
- Type: Foundation school
- Established: 1923/1955/1974
- Local authority: Birmingham City Council
- Department for Education URN: 103519 Tables
- Ofsted: Reports
- Head teacher: Andrew Bate
- Gender: Coeducational
- Age: 11 to 18
- Enrolment: ~1,360
- Houses: 6
- Colours: Black, red & white
- Website: www.moseley.bham.sch.uk

Moseley School and Sixth Form is a coeducational secondary school and sixth form located in the Moseley area of Birmingham, England. The school's main entrance is situated on Wake Green Road, with other entrances on College Road and Springfield Road, and it lies in the parish of St Christopher, Springfield.

The school is non-denominational with around 1,500 students, two-thirds of whom are boys. 80% do not have English as a first language, and over 40% are eligible for free school meals. The March 2016 Ofsted report graded the school as good with good features, at which students make good progress. The school comprises three main buildings on a single campus – a Victorian college built in the 1850s, a building completed in 2012 and a newly built sports complex.

== School history (to 1974) ==
In 1838 a private house in Spring Hill, Hockley, Birmingham, was opened as Spring Hill College, for the training of Congregationalist ministers, under the patronage of George Storer Mansfield (1764–1837) and his two sisters Sarah (1767–1853) and Elizabeth (1772–1847). Twenty years later, in 1857, after expansion to include a further three private houses, the establishment, still under the name Spring Hill College, moved to new, much larger, purpose-built premises on Wake Green Road, in what was then rural Worcestershire, some miles south of the city. This striking Gothic revival building was designed by the architect Joseph James, and is particularly noted for its gargoyles.

In 1886, the college was closed and a replacement institution founded in Oxford, known as Mansfield College (now part of the University of Oxford). Meanwhile, in 1892, the Wake Green Road buildings were re-opened as the Pine Dell Hydropathic Establishment and Moseley Botanical Gardens, which entailed the construction of a swimming bath (with highly decorative ceiling) and greenhouses. It soon became an important community hub, hosting a great variety of events, such as concerts and plays, and classes for local children. One of these was the future author J. R. R. Tolkien.

Pine Dell Hydropathic Establishment closed in 1900, and the buildings became a private residence. In the same year, further down College Road (itself named after Spring Hill College), the local school board opened a new institution named College Road Board School, for both junior and senior pupils, later transferred to Birmingham City Council in 1911 with the expansion of the city boundaries. The juniors eventually became Springfield Primary School (now Springfield Primary Academy) in the same premises, while in 1955 the seniors moved up the hill to a site adjacent to the former Spring Hill College.

With the outbreak of the First World War in 1914, the former Spring Hill College buildings were commandeered by the War Office for a military barracks. Later, they also briefly housed an orphanage, and a temporary teacher training facility for veterans.

Finally, in 1923, the former Spring Hill College premises were acquired by Birmingham City Council, which opened them as Moseley Secondary School, for boys only and with a selective entrance examination. Major Ernest Robinson served as headmaster until 1956. The study bedrooms of the former college were merged in pairs to form classrooms, and the former hydropathic swimming bath was boarded over to serve as the school assembly hall (now the main library). An extension was built to house laboratories and further classrooms. A feature of the school was that the headmaster would live on the premises, which continued as the practice until 1972. Moseley Secondary School changed its name to Moseley Grammar School in 1939. Almost immediately, school life was completely disrupted by the Second World War, when the entire school population was evacuated. A semblance of normality did not return until the 1944/45 school year.

In 1955 the City Council opened Moseley (Secondary) Modern School, fronting College Road, on what had previously been a playing field next to Moseley Grammar School, as the new home of the seniors from College Road School. This new school, with Miss Eileen Cohen (later Mrs Eileen North), previously head of College Road Seniors, as headmistress until 1967, was both co-educational and non-selective, and specialised in performing arts such as theatre and music. Only a fence separated it from the grammar school, and relations between the two sets of pupils were not always peaceful.

During the headmastership of Bruce Gaskin, 1956 to 1972, Moseley Grammar School acquired its reputation for academic excellence, having previously been known more for its sporting achievements, particularly in rugby. In 1968 it acquired a former inn near Abergavenny, Wales, known as Old Grouse Cottage, for outdoor activities and field trips, which the school retained until 2014. The school was designated a Grade II listed building in the year of Mr Gaskin's retirement.

== School history (since 1974) ==
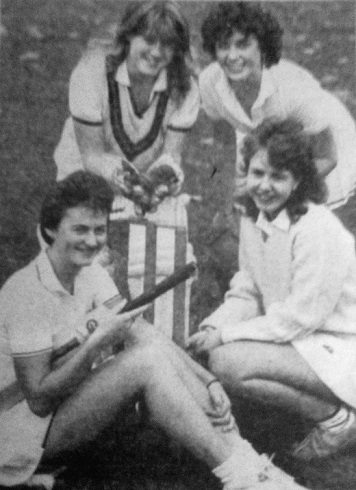
Four Moseley School sixth-formers win cricket scholarships to Aston University, 1984.

In 1974, after two years of uncertainty, Moseley Grammar School and Moseley Modern School were amalgamated into a single school. This change was controversial but supported by many (among the latter, Mr Gaskin, who after his retirement remained active on the new school's Board of Governors until the 1980s). The combined establishment, known simply as Moseley School, became one of the largest comprehensives in Birmingham. Initially at least, it inherited the good reputations of its predecessors in their respective fields. Moseley Grammar School had been without a head since 1972, and Donald Wilford, headmaster of Moseley Modern School since 1967, applied for the appointment as head of the combined school.

In the event, the job went to an outsider, Alan Goodfellow, who was on record as being bitterly critical of comprehensive education. He was also plagued by ill-health and died in office in 1981, after which a number of institutions that had survived the amalgamation, such as a school house system, were allowed to lapse.

David Swinfen was appointed as head the following year. His ambitious plans, however, were overwhelmed by events, when the former Moseley Grammar School, known since the amalgamation as the West Wing, began falling apart as a result of decades of neglect and under-funding. In 1986 the roof of the old library was declared unsafe halfway through an exam, and the entire building was closed and subsequently earmarked for demolition – the latter prevented only by Mr Swinfen's speedily organised campaign and the resultant public outcry. By the end of his tenure in 1992, the school had undergone a radical change of character, following the redrawing of its catchment area in 1987/88. Hitherto, Moseley School had taken a majority of its pupils from the (then) largely white area of Hall Green, but now it took them from the mainly Asian area of Sparkhill.

Cricket has always been a popular sport at Moseley School, and the school field often doubled up as a cricket pitch. Since 1994 it has been the permanent home of the Birmingham-based Attock Cricket Club, which has invested money in improving facilities, including the rebuilding and expansion of the pavilion in 1998.

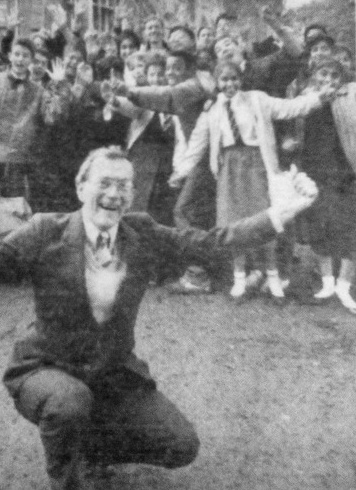
Head David Swinfen celebrates the saving of Moseley School from demolition, 1987.

The campaign for the restoration of the West Wing continued for many years. In 1995 Mrs Mary Miles, head teacher from 1992 to 2001, authorised the formation of the Moseleians Association, for former students and staff of Moseley School and its various predecessor institutions. It publishes the twice-yearly Moseleian Gazette, and organises regular reunions and many other events. Continuing the work of the Old Moseleians Association – founded by Major Robinson in 1927, but with which the school had severed links in 1968 – the Moseleians Association has assumed an increasingly important role in school life. It sponsors competitions and prizes for pupils, raises funds for restoration work, plants trees on the school grounds, and has taken over the administration of the school archives.

After being closed and shored up with scaffolding for more than a decade, in 1998 – with financial assistance from the Heritage Lottery Fund and the European Regional Development Fund – the West Wing was completely refurbished, and re-opened as the new home of the school sixth form. To coincide with its re-opening, the three daughters of Mr Gaskin published Moseley into the Millennium: The Story of Moseley School, detailing and celebrating the history of the school.

=== Rebuilding ===
Following the resignation of David Peck, head teacher from 2001 to 2008, Tim Boyes, head of nearby Queensbridge School, was brought in as an interim replacement. He, and the City Council, advocated the creation of a combined Trust to administer both schools, which would share facilities and have a merged sixth form, based at Moseley School. This plan, however, was scrapped in 2011 when Mr Boyes failed to secure the job of head teacher on a permanent basis.

As part of the government's 'Building Schools for the Future' (BSF) strategy, in 2009 Moseley School received approval for a massive new rebuilding programme, involving the complete demolition of the East Wing (the former Moseley Modern School, now in a bad state of repair), with the exception of its more recently built sporting facilities, later to be significantly upgraded. A new building would be constructed straddling the boundary between the West Wing and East Wing sites, despite the steep incline from the latter to the former. The West Wing would also have a number of alterations carried out to increase its capacity.

These plans survived the Coalition Government's cuts almost completely intact. Work began in summer 2011 and was completed by October 2012. The East Wing was demolished in February 2013 and the new building, which had already been in use for some months, was officially opened by the Lord Mayor of Birmingham, Councillor Mike Leddy, on 30 June 2013. The school invested in excess of £1.5 million into ICT facilities to transform learning and teaching, with larger than average classrooms to provide students with a flexible learning environment. The West Wing was renamed Building A and the new building, most of which is also on the old West Wing site, became known as Building B.

Craig Jansen, head teacher from 2011 to 2015, introduced eight new school houses to Moseley School, which had been without a house system since 1982. Named after Oxford colleges, these were Mansfield, Nuffield, Keble, Pembroke, Hertford, Worcester, Lincoln and Exeter. The last two were removed in 2015 by Roger McBrien, head teacher until 2019, reducing the number to six.

== Evolution of school badges ==
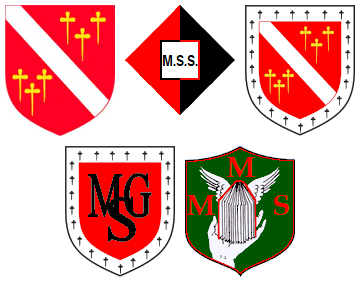
Moseley School badges.

Top row: (1) Arms of Spring Hill College 1838–1886, and reputedly of George Storer Mansfield, a stained glass version of which appears in the school tower. (2) Moseley Secondary School 1923, temporary badge. (3) Moseley Secondary School 1923–1939, Moseley Grammar School 1939–1974, Moseley School 1974– , school colours black, red and white, the Spring Hill Arms with addition of an ermine border of 23 spots – the year that Moseley Secondary School opened.

Bottom row: (4) Moseley Grammar School 1939–1945, alternative badge used by evacuee pupils during the Second World War, for ease of identification. (5) Moseley Modern School 1955–1974, school colours red and green.

== List of head teachers ==
The following is a list of all those who have held the office of head teacher (or equivalent), or acted as such during vacancies, of Moseley School and its predecessor institutions, since Spring Hill College was first opened in 1838.

Spring Hill College (1838-1886) (Note: Resident tutor to 1884, Principal thereafter. Spring Hill College moved from Hockley to purpose-built premises on Wake Green Road in 1857. It adopted a new constitution under the title of Mansfield College in 1884, but the Wake Green Road premises retained the name Spring Hill College until closure in 1886.)
Thomas Barker 1838-1870
David Worthington Simon 1869-1883
George Deane 1883-1884
Andrew Fairbairn (acting) 1884-1886
Pine Dell Hydropathic Establishment (1892-1900) (Note: Proprietor. Pine Dell Hydropathic Establishment and Moseley Botanical Gardens opened in the former premises of Spring Hill College in 1892. After 1900 the Ross family continued to use the buildings as a private residence until they were commandeered by the military at the outbreak of war in 1914.)
William Ross 1892-1900	College Road Board School (1900-1934) (Note: Headmaster/Headmistress. College Road Board School, now Springfield Primary Academy, was opened in 1900 for both junior and senior pupils.)
	George Edwards (Boys' Dept.) 1900-1933
	Mary Sewards (Girls' Dept.) 1900-1925
	Minnie Woodhouse (Girls' Dept.) 1925-1934
Moseley Secondary School (1923-1939) (Note: Headmaster. Moseley Secondary School opened in 1923 in the former premises of Spring Hill College.)	College Road Senior School (1934-1955) (Note: Headmistress. College Road Board School became College Road Junior School and College Road Senior School, both on the same site, in 1934, following a reorganisation that saw the merger of the boys' and girls' departments.)
Ernest Robinson 1923-1956	Elizabeth Mason 1934-1952
Moseley Grammar School (1939-1974) (Note: Headmaster. Moseley Secondary School changed its name to Moseley Grammar School in 1939.)	Moseley Modern School (1955-1974) (Note: Headmistress/Headmaster. College Road Senior School moved to much larger, newly built premises, adjacent to Moseley Grammar School, in 1955, becoming Moseley Modern School.)
Bruce Gaskin 1956-1972	Eileen North (née Cohen) 1952-1967
Derek Moore (acting) 1972-1974	Donald Wilford 1967-1974
Moseley School (1974- ) (Note: Headmaster to 1982, Head teacher thereafter. Moseley School was formed by the amalgamation of Moseley Grammar School and Moseley Modern School in 1974, which became known as the West Wing and East Wing respectively. The East Wing was largely demolished in 2013, replaced by a new building straddling the two sites. Head teachers based primarily in the East Wing, prior to its demolition, are listed on the right. Styled Moseley School: A Language College 2000-2012, Moseley School and Sixth Form 2021- .)
Alan Goodfellow 1974-1981
Philip Bullock (acting) 1981
John Lockwood (acting) 1981-1982	(East)
	David Swinfen 1982-1992
	Mary Miles 1992-2001
	David Peck 2001-2008
(West)	Timothy Boyes (interim) 2008-2011
Craig Jansen 2011-2015
Roger McBrien 2015-2019
Andrew Bate 2019-

_{
}

== Former pupils ==
The individuals below are listed by the Moseleians Association as famous Moseleians, former pupils of Moseley Secondary School (MSS), College Road Senior School (CRSS), Moseley Grammar School (MGS), Moseley Modern School (MMS), and Moseley School (MS).

- Kabir Ali (MS), cricketer.
- Moeen Ali (MS), cricketer.
- Bev Bevan (MGS), drummer for ELO.
- Jasper Carrott (Robert Davis) (MGS), comedian and game show host.
- Carl Chinn (MGS), historian and broadcaster.
- Sharon Corbett (MMS), Commonwealth sportswoman.
- Sir Alan Cottrell (MSS), Fellow of Jesus College, Cambridge.
- Sir Douglas Hague (MGS), economist.
- Maurice Herriott (MMS), Olympic sportsman.
- Frank Ifield (CRSS), singer.
- Anthony Jackson (MGS), actor.
- Anton Lesser (MGS), actor.
- Mickey Lewis (MS), footballer and manager.
- Noel Luke (MS), footballer.
- Joanne Malin (MS), radio and television presenter.
- Roy Massey (MGS), organist and choir director.
- Daphne Slater (MMS), Olympic sportswoman.
- Gladstone Small (MS), cricketer.
- Chris Spedding (MGS), musician.
- Richard Tandy (MGS), keyboard player for ELO.
- John Taylor, Baron Taylor of Warwick (MGS), politician (life peer) and barrister.
- David Turner (MGS), dramatist.

== In popular culture ==
The author J. R. R. Tolkien lived very near Spring Hill College as a child, and according to his first biographer, Humphrey Carpenter, he visited the college, which at that time housed the Pine Dell Hydropathic Establishment, with his mother and brother for the celebration of Queen Victoria's Diamond Jubilee in 1897. The imposing Gothic building left a lasting impression on him, and the college tower, in particular, is the likely inspiration for the tower of Isengard in The Lord of the Rings. Other places in the immediate vicinity, such as Sarehole Mill and Moseley Bog, are also known to have inspired his fictional creations.

Novels by other writers that are set, wholly or in substantial part, at Moseley School include Aealdra (2013) by Tony Steele, Brittle (2022) by Frank Discussion, and If These Walls Could Whisper (2013) by Rod Ling.

During the 1960s and '70s Moseley Modern School was used as the outside broadcast filming location for the fictional Kings Oak Secondary School in the popular Birmingham-based TV soap Crossroads.
