= Robin Hood Academy =

Location
- Pitmaston Road; Hall Green; Birmingham, West Midlands, B28 9PP
- Coordinates: 52.4257°N 1.8312°W

Information
- Type: Primary academy
- Department for Education URN: 140262 Tables
- Ofsted: Reports
- Executive Head Teacher: Steve Taylor
- Gender: Coeducational
- Age: 3 to 11
- Website: http://www.robinhood.bham.sch.uk/

Robin Hood Academy is a coeducational primary school with academy status, located in Hall Green area of Birmingham, England.

== History ==
The school was opened on the site of the since closed Pitmaston Secondary School in 1988 and originally known as 'Robin Hood Junior & Infants School'. Although this official title remained until academy conversion in 2013, the school became widely known as 'Robin Hood Primary School' and used the tagline 'the school of the future for the learner of today'.

The first head teacher, Dave Broadfield, established the school as a leader in the use of Information & Communication Technologies in primary education. This work was continued by subsequent head Dr. Neil Hopkin, who established Robin Hood as one of the earlier English schools to use blogs for every class from Nursery to Year 6.

In 2011 teacher Oliver Quinlan won the Association of Learning Technologist's 'Learning technologist of the year' award for his work with online learning at the school.

In 2013 Robin Hood converted to academy status under the executive headship of Richard Hunter and was renamed Robin Hood Academy.

In January 2016, Steve Bob took up the role of Executive Headteacher. The school was graded good by Ofsted in November 2016. In 2019, Mrs Downs took role of head teacher. Its new tag line builds upon the aspirations of all pupils: "To aim high and reach for the stars."
