= Moseley Bog =

Peat bog and nature reserve in Birmingham, England

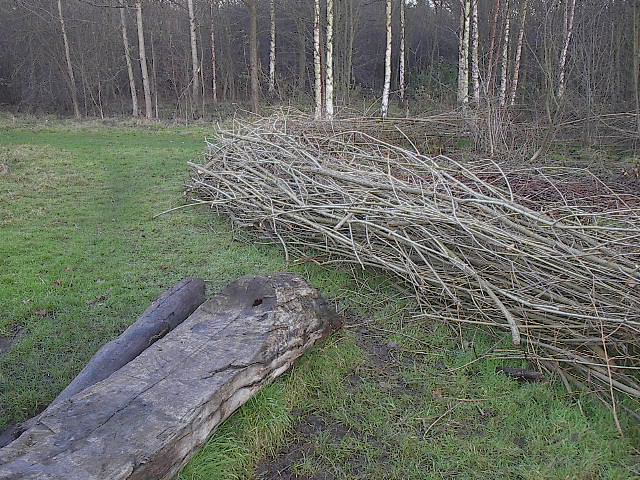
- Interactive map of Moseley Bog
- Type: Local Nature Reserve; Site of Importance for Nature Conservation
- Location: Moseley, Birmingham
- Coordinates: 52°26′10″N 1°51′47″W
- Operator: Wildlife Trust for Birmingham and the Black Country
- Website: www.bbcwildlife.org.uk/Moseley-Bog

Moseley Bog and Joy's Wood Local Nature Reserve, formerly The Dell, is a Local Nature Reserve in the Moseley area of Birmingham, England, with an area of about 12 ha (29 acres). Along with the nearby Sarehole Mill, and a number of other sites, it forms part of the Shire Country Park.

== History ==
Evidence of human activity at Moseley Bog dates back some three thousand years, to the Bronze Age, in the form of burnt mounds on the banks of Coldbath Brook, which runs through the bog. Comprising piles of cracked stones and burnt wood, archaeologists believe them to be the remains of sweat lodges – huts, or bender tents, in which water was poured over heated stones to create a sauna, often for the purpose of spiritual purification, followed by a cold bath. The mounds and their surrounding area are Scheduled Ancient Monuments.

The forested area of the bog is a surviving fragment of primeval wildwood, much of the surrounding parts of which had been cleared by the time of the Domesday Book in 1086, replaced with meadowland and common land, used for grazing livestock and strip farming. The boggy area was once a secondary reservoir to feed the millpond at Sarehole Mill. Although now drained, the embankment on its eastern side remains. Coldbath Brook flows from Coldbath Pool, in what is now Moseley Golf Course, through a culvert, then through Moseley Bog as an open stream, and is then culverted to the millpond, from whence it flows to its confluence with the River Cole.

The western half of the current nature reserve, adjoining the bog, had been used by Birmingham City Council as a landfill site from 1960 to 1973, when it was levelled off and converted into a playing field for Moseley School.

In 1980 the city council announced its intention to build a housing estate on the bog. This led to the successful Save Our Bog campaign, organised by the urban conservation activist Joy Fifer, which saved the site from development and helped inspire the Urban Wildlife movement. Fifer's campaign also popularised the name Moseley Bog for the site, which had hitherto been known as The Dell. Starting with a major tree planting initiative in 1987, the school playing field adjoining the bog, which had proven to be damp and unsuitable, has been allowed to revert to natural woodland, to create what is now known as Joy's Wood, named after Joy Fifer.

In 1984 Moseley Bog hosted the first ever International Dawn Chorus Day, organised by the Urban Wildlife Trust, founded in Birmingham in 1980 and now the Wildlife Trust for Birmingham and the Black Country. The whole site was declared a Local Nature Reserve (LNR) by Birmingham City Council on 17 July 1991. Much of the area comprising Moseley Bog had been declared a Site of Special Scientific Interest (SSSI) in 1980. However, following its LNR declaration and re-evaluation by English Nature the site was denotified as an SSSI on 21 July 1992, but remains a locally designated Site of Importance for Nature Conservation (SINC). In 2000 it was formally renamed Moseley Bog and Joy's Wood Local Nature Reserve.

In August 2006 a public consultation on proposals to conserve the site, enhance access and encourage a wider audience was launched. In March 2010, a lottery grant of £376,500 was awarded for improvements and restoration while management of the site was leased to the Wildlife Trust for Birmingham and the Black Country by the city council. On 26 June 2011, a formal reopening was conducted by the Lord Mayor of Birmingham, Councillor Anita Ward.

It is a popular meeting place for local Pagan groups, including the Daughters of Frya – Oera Linda Order of Priestesses and Dinas Canolog – The Grove of the Central City. In 2011 it was the venue for the In Memory of a Free Festival event at the summer solstice.

== Culture ==
J. R. R. Tolkien lived nearby, as a child, and acknowledged the site as inspiration for the ancient forests in his books The Lord of the Rings and The Hobbit. Nearby Sarehole Mill and the surrounding area on the River Cole are said to have been inspiration for Tolkien's writings.

In 1966, in an interview for The Guardian, Tolkien said (emphasis added):

It was a kind of lost paradise … There was an old mill that really did grind corn with two millers, a great big pond with swans on it, a sandpit, a wonderful dell with flowers, a few old-fashioned village houses and, further away, a stream with another mill. I always knew it would go — and it did.

A house adjacent to the reserve (since demolished) was used by reggae band UB40 as a studio for their earliest recordings.
