= Douglas Hague =

British economist

Sir Douglas Chalmers Hague CBE (20 October 1926 – 1 February 2015) was a British economist who was a close associate of Margaret Thatcher.

== Biography ==
Hague was born in Bramley, Leeds, to Laurence Hague, a municipal clerk and Marion (née Chalmers). The family moved to Birmingham when he was three years old. Hague was educated at Moseley Grammar School (now Moseley School) and King Edward's School, Birmingham, and took a bachelor of commerce degree at Birmingham University. He was assistant lecturer, then lecturer, then Reader in Political Economy at University College, London, 1947–57.

He moved to be the Newton Chambers Professor of Economics at the University of Sheffield at the young age of 30, 1957–63.

Whilst at Sheffield, Hague also spent a year as visiting professor at Duke University, North Carolina, from 1960-61. During this time, Sheffield University granted him limited funds to visit American Business Schools with a view to setting up a similar operation in Sheffield. This led to one or two summer schools for business people in Sheffield.

Subsequently, Hague became Professor of Applied Economics at the University of Manchester 1963–65, and Professor of Managerial Economics at the Manchester Business School which he helped to set up, 1965–81. During this time in the mid 1970s, Hague was also a member and later deputy chairman of the Prices Commission from 1973 to 1978.

With Norman Strauss he set up a strategic leadership programme at Templeton College, Oxford, and taught there from 1982 to 1997. At the same time he was chairman or director of various companies.

Later, Hague became passionate about entrepreneurship and spin off businesses from universities and classed himself as a 'knowledge angel'. He wrote a book about this with Christine Holmes. He was associated with the Entrepreneurship Centre at the Saïd Business School in Oxford from its inception in 2002.

One of Hague's first books, A Textbook of Economic Theory, brought him to the attention of Margaret Thatcher (later Baroness Thatcher) and he joined the No. 10 Policy Unit under Sir John Hoskyns. He was chairman of the Economic and Social Research Council 1983–87. He sometimes wrote speeches for Thatcher and remained a friend of her and her husband Denis.

Hague was appointed CBE in 1978 and knighted in the 1982 New Year Honours "for Political and Public Service."

== Publications ==
- Stonier, Alfred W. & Hague, Douglas C. (1953) A Textbook of Economic Theory Longmans ISBN 978-0-58244-854-4
- Hague, D. C. (1969) Managerial Economics. Longmans ISBN B0006BZBAW
- Hague, D. C. (1971) Pricing in Business. George Allen & Unwin ISBN 0-04-658040-9
- Hague, Douglas Chalmers (1993) Transforming the Dinosaurs: How Organisations Learn ISBN 978-1-89830-910-9
- Hague, Douglas, & Holmes, Christine (2006) Oxford Entrepreneurs CIHE ISBN 1-874223-60-2
