= Tahir Ali =

British politician (born 1971)

Tahir Ali MP
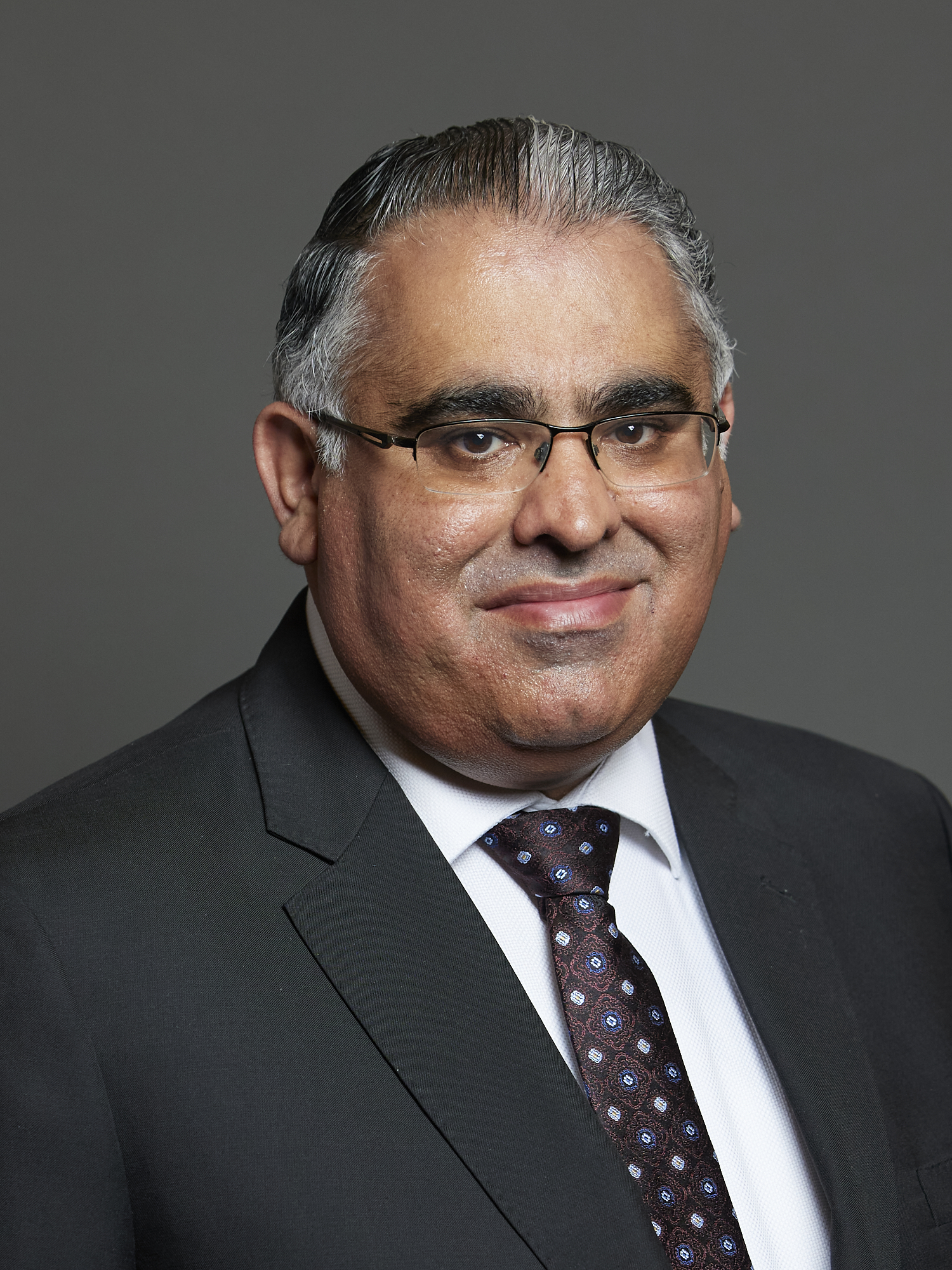
- Official portrait, 2024

Member of Parliament for Birmingham Hall Green and Moseley Birmingham Hall Green (2019–2024)
- Incumbent
- Assumed office 12 December 2019
- Preceded by: Roger Godsiff
- Constituency: Birmingham Hall Green and Moseley
- Majority: 5,656 (13.6%)

Member of Birmingham City Council for Nechells Ward
- In office 10 June 2004 – 5 May 2022
- Preceded by: Tariq Khan
- Succeeded by: Lee Marsham
- In office 6 May 1999 – 1 May 2003
- Preceded by: T. Khan
- Succeeded by: Tariq Khan

Personal details
- Born: 15 October 1971 (age 54) Birmingham, West Midlands, England
- Party: Labour
- Other political affiliations: Socialist Campaign Group
- Children: 4

Tahir Ali (born 15 October 1971) is a British Labour politician who has served as the Member of Parliament (MP) for Birmingham Hall Green and Moseley, previously Birmingham Hall Green, since 2019. On the political left, he is a member of the Socialist Campaign Group, and has advocated for blasphemy laws.

== Early life and career ==
Tahir Ali was born on 15 October 1971 in Birmingham to Pakistani parents. He worked for Royal Mail after securing an engineering apprenticeship at the age of 17. He is an active trade unionist and served as a political officer for the Communication Workers Union.

Ali represented the Nechells Ward on Birmingham City Council from 1999 and was last re-elected in 2018 to serve until 2022, when he did not seek re-election. He served as part of the council's cabinet from 2000 to 2003 and 2012 to 2016, (shadow cabinet 2004 to 2012) his responsibilities including local services, development, jobs, skills, transport and the economy. In 2012, he was the only ethnic minority member of the team.

== Parliamentary career ==
In October 2019 Ali was selected as the Labour prospective parliamentary candidate for Birmingham Hall Green. The candidate selection process was undertaken by the Labour Party's National Executive Committee. The campaign was marred by intimidation from former MP Roger Godsiff's supporters, resulting in three police investigations, one arrest for malicious communications and police patrols outside polling stations.

At the 2019 general election, Ali was elected to Parliament as MP for Birmingham Hall Green with 67.8% of the vote and a majority of 28,508.

He endorsed Rebecca Long-Bailey in the 2020 Labour Party leadership election and Angela Rayner in the deputy leadership election.

In April 2020, Ali was given a formal warning by police after he broke government restrictions by attending a funeral with up to 100 mourners during the coronavirus pandemic. West Midlands Labour Party Police commissioner David Jamieson also publicly condemned Ali's conduct, stating that his actions were "totally irresponsible" and that he "is not serving his constituents by endangering their lives". Ali issued an apology stating that he only attended as an observer and would not be attending any other similar gatherings.

Ali was a member of the European Scrutiny Committee from March 2020 until May 2024. He was also a member of the Justice Committee from March 2023 until May 2024.

Due to the 2023 periodic review of Westminster constituencies, Ali's constituency of Birmingham Hall Green was abolished, and replaced with Birmingham Hall Green and Moseley. At the 2024 general election, Ali was elected to Parliament as MP for Birmingham Hall Green and Moseley with 30.8% of the vote and a majority of 5,656.

In November 2024, he asked Prime Minister Keir Starmer to "commit to introducing measures to prohibit the desecration of all religious texts and the prophets of Abrahamic religions". The Independent wrote that the question "raised concerns he was in effect calling for a blasphemy law", and noted that Starmer neither rejected the proposal nor mentioned a specific response. The National Secular Society called such a proposal "deeply alarming".

In March 2025, Ali was one of 20 MPs to sign a letter addressed to the prime minister of Pakistan, to build a new airport in Mirpur, Azad Kashmir in order to save travel time for visitors from Britain. Figures including Labour minister Dan Jarvis, and Conservative shadow minister Robert Jenrick said that Ali and the other signees should have been focusing on domestic issues such as a refuse collection strike in Birmingham. Kenan Malik of The Guardian noted that Ali had never voted in parliament on matters related to welfare reform or benefits cuts, but had campaigned for this airport, and the introduction of blasphemy law.

=== Foreign policy positions ===
As of May 2025, Ali is the chair of the All-Party Parliamentary Groups for Kuwait, Turkey and Yemen.

Ali has been critical of the government of Narendra Modi in India. In March 2021, he expressed his "absolute support for, and solidarity with, the farmers protesting in India" and called for sanctions to be imposed on the government of India, citing the "abuse the human and civil rights not only of farmers, but of Kashmiri people through the military occupation of the region". Ali further said that "political opponents of Modi in India are at risk of arbitrary arrest, and the civil liberties of all Indians are being eroded by an extremist, rightwing government".

On 24 February 2022, following the 2022 Russian invasion of Ukraine, Ali was one of 11 Labour MPs threatened with losing the party whip after they signed a statement by the Stop the War Coalition which questioned the legitimacy of NATO and accused the military alliance of "eastward expansion". All 11 MPs subsequently removed their signatures.

He is a member of Labour Friends of Palestine and the Middle East. During Prime Minister's Questions on 24 January 2024, Ali stirred controversy around the Gaza war. He asserted that Prime Minister Rishi Sunak bore responsibility for "the blood of thousands of innocent people on his hands," sparking significant public and parliamentary attention. In response to the backlash, Ali issued a formal apology on the same day, expressing regret for the choice of words, whilst maintaining his steadfast views on the Middle East. He acknowledged the need to apologise for the manner in which he described the Prime Minister.

In a parliamentary debate on 15 September 2026, Ali responded to another MP, who called for Hamas to be disarmed, by asking “should we not also be calling for Israel’s disarmament, given the atrocities that have been committed? Previous Governments have intervened in the middle east to take action on human rights abuses and protect international trade routes. Is it not about time that military action was taken against Israel as well?” He posted a video of his comment on social media, but later deleted it and apologised for “wrongly [giving] the impression that I support the use of military force against Israel. Those are not my views, and I apologise unreservedly. I do not support military action anywhere in the Middle East and have long been a campaigner for peace and conflict resolution.”

Parliament of the United Kingdom
Preceded by Roger Godsiff	Member of Parliament for Birmingham Hall Green; 2019–2024	Constituency abolished
New constituency	Member of Parliament for Birmingham Hall Green and Moseley; 2024–present	Incumbent
