= River Cole, West Midlands =

River in the English Midlands

River Cole
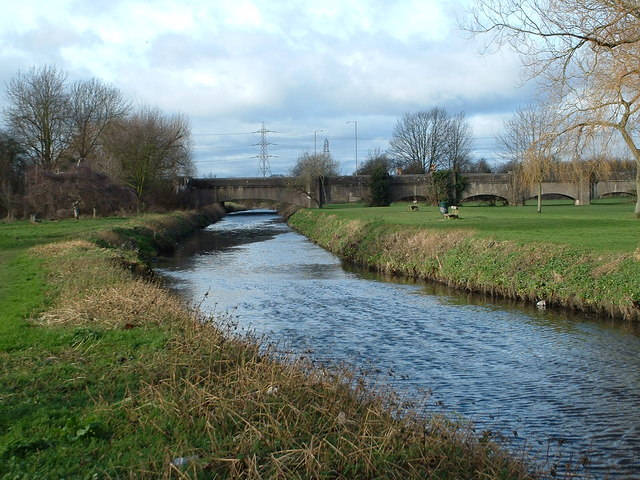
- Coleshill, near the confluence with the Blythe

Location
- Country: England
- Counties: Worcestershire, West Midlands, Warwickshire
- Towns and Cities: Wythall, Birmingham, Shirley, Chelmsley Wood, Coleshill

Physical characteristics
- Source
  - location: Kings Norton, West Midlands, and Wythall, Worcestershire
  - coordinates: 52°21′40″N 1°53′14″W
- Mouth
  - location: Confluence with the River Blythe at Ladywalk reserve
  - coordinates: 52°31′5″N 1°41′20″W
- Length: 40 km (25 mi)

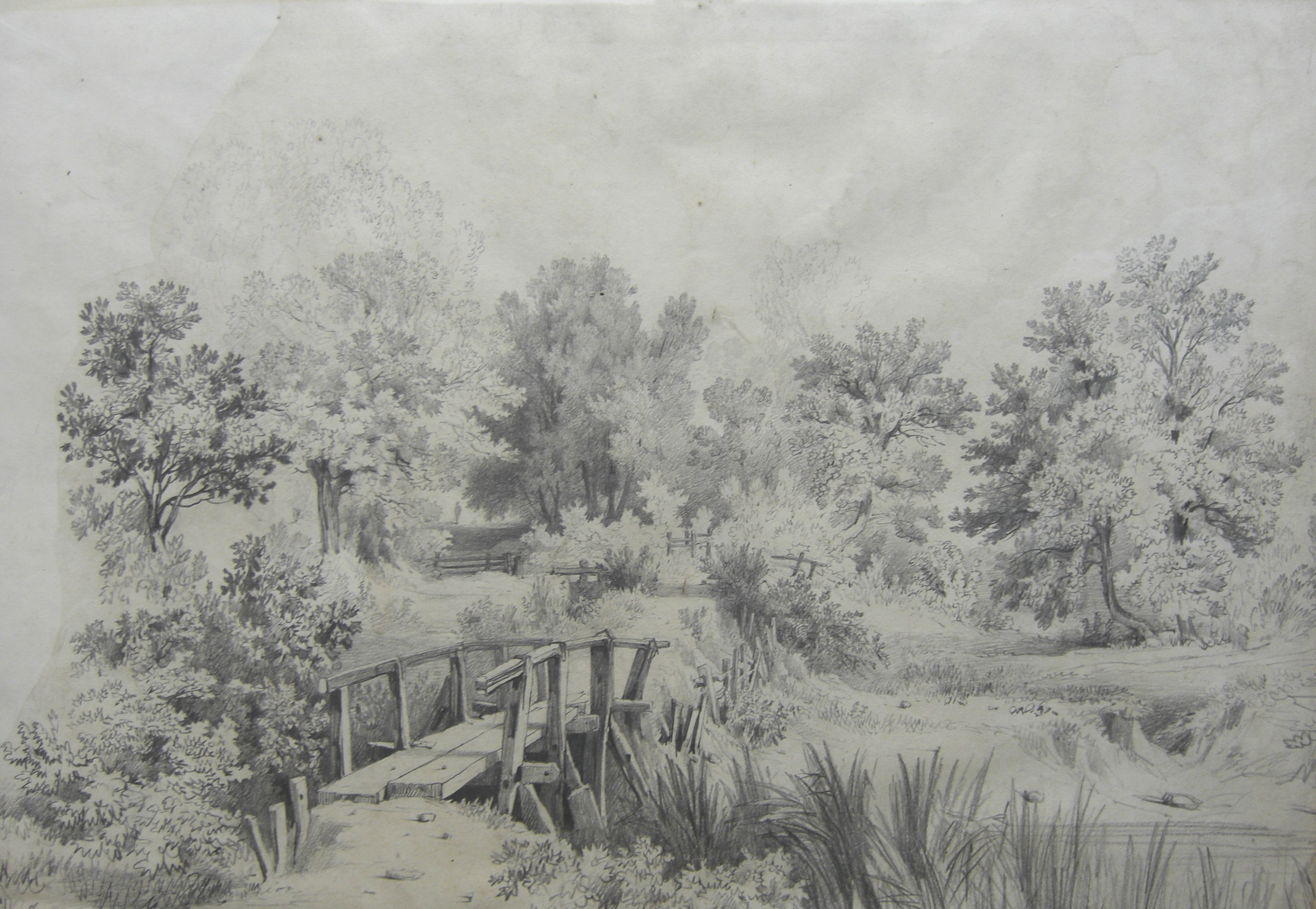
Wooden bridge over the Cole at Shirley, drawn in the 19th century by Samuel Rostill Lines.

The River Cole is a 25-mile-long (40-kilometre) river in the English Midlands. It rises on the lower slopes of Forhill, one of the south-western ramparts of the Birmingham Plateau, at Red Hill and flows south before flowing largely north-east across the plateau to enter the River Blythe below Coleshill, near Ladywalk, shortly before the Blythe meets the Tame. This then joins the Trent, whose waters reach the North Sea via the Humber Estuary. Its source is very near the main watershed of Midland England: tributaries are few and very short except in the lower reaches, so the Cole is only a small stream. The stretch between Shard End and Tyseley formed part of the historic border between Warwickshire and Worcestershire.

== Geology ==
The average gradient of the central reaches is 10 1/2 feet per mile (2.0 metres per kilometre). There is a fast run-off from the drift covered Keuper marl clay which makes up its catchment area, and heavy rain produces sudden floods; in the absence of replenishing side-streams these subside as quickly as they rise. The Cole is normally shallow, except where weirs maintain an artificial depth.

== Etymology ==
It bears a Celtic name derived from the old British word for hazel. In a charter of AD 972 of Pershore Abbey the river throughout Yardley is 'Colle'. It has since borne several different local names:

Year	Name
972	Colle
1275	Maerebroc (Boundary Brook)
1495	Water of Cowle
1609	Water of Cole
1649	Inkford Brook (south of Yardley)
18th century	Hemill, Hay Mill Brook
18th century	Low Brook (south of Yardley)
18th century	Greet Brook

== Description of the course ==
A southern tributary rises in fields at Hob Hill, its course runs through farm land and is then joined in the vicinity of the aptly named Watery Lane by a northern tributary which rises in Redhill and crosses Kings Norton golf club. The combined river then is bridged by the A435, Alcester Road by the, now closed, Horse and Jockey Public House from where it crosses fields and Fulford Heath golf club to the east of Wythall before passing under an aqueduct for the Stratford-upon-Avon Canal on Peterbrook Road at Major's Green. Skirting to the west of Shirley and passing the site and former mill pond of Bache Mill, it is joined on its eastern bank by the Shirley Brook which forms the boundary between Birmingham and Solihull.

=== Shire Country Park ===
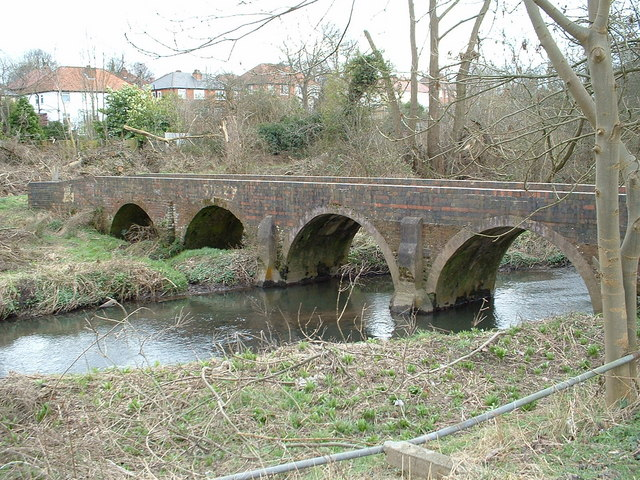
Four Arches Bridge, near Cole Valley Road, Billesley

Crossing Slade Lane at a ford, the 'slade' is the Cole's black silted boggy valley, it begins a journey through the seven kilometres, between Yardley Wood and Small Heath of the Shire Country Park. Firstly passing through Scribers Lane SINC (Site of Nature Conservation Interest), a diverse site with mixed broadleaf woodland containing wet flushes and ditches, a disused millrace and a wetland scrape. Over the past few years there have been reports of Eurasian otter, water vole and water rail in this area. It runs along the River to the Scribers Lane Ford. A leat also carries water to the mill race and former mill pond of Tritterford Mill. It is bridged at Highfield Road by what was formally Titterford wain bridge built in the early 19th century but now replaced by a new bridge by which Highfield Road sweeps across the river and up the hill to Christ Church. Due to the construction of the mill pool, Chinn Brook had to be diverted far into the Dingles, flowing at a lesser gradient than the river, until it could join the Cole at the same level. The river then flows through the Dingles where towards Brook Lane is Four Arches Bridge. First recorded in 1822, it formerly linked Webb and Old Brook Lanes. The wain ford alongside and the side approached have disappeared. When the North Warwickshire Line was being built between 1906/7, its embankment cut off both Webb Lane and Robin Hood Lane and to avoid the cost of two bridges so close together, a single span was placed centrally and the lanes diverted to it. Both fords then went out of use. For two decades the Four Arches Bridge continued to be used, but then Cole Valley Road was built up and thenceforward the bridge led nowhere, and it was allowed to fall into ruin until only the arch courses and piers remained. A local campaign succeeded in achieving its handsome restoration. The race to Sarehole Mill formerly went under Brook Lane in a culvert, but this has been blocked and the line of the race is lost to northward. The spillway from race to river is seen to be still there, and the slots for the removable plank weir can be seen. The riverside walk continues as the John Morris Jones Walkway past the site of Robin Hood Lane ford, across Cotterills Meadow which has been Colebank Playing Field for the last ninety years until it reaches the Grade II Listed water mill, Sarehole Mill at Hall Green. The Coldbath Brook, a tributary of the Cole, drives the mill which is now a museum and one of the inspirations for J. R. R. Tolkien's The Lord of the Rings. The Shire Country Park ranger office is located at Sarehole Mill.

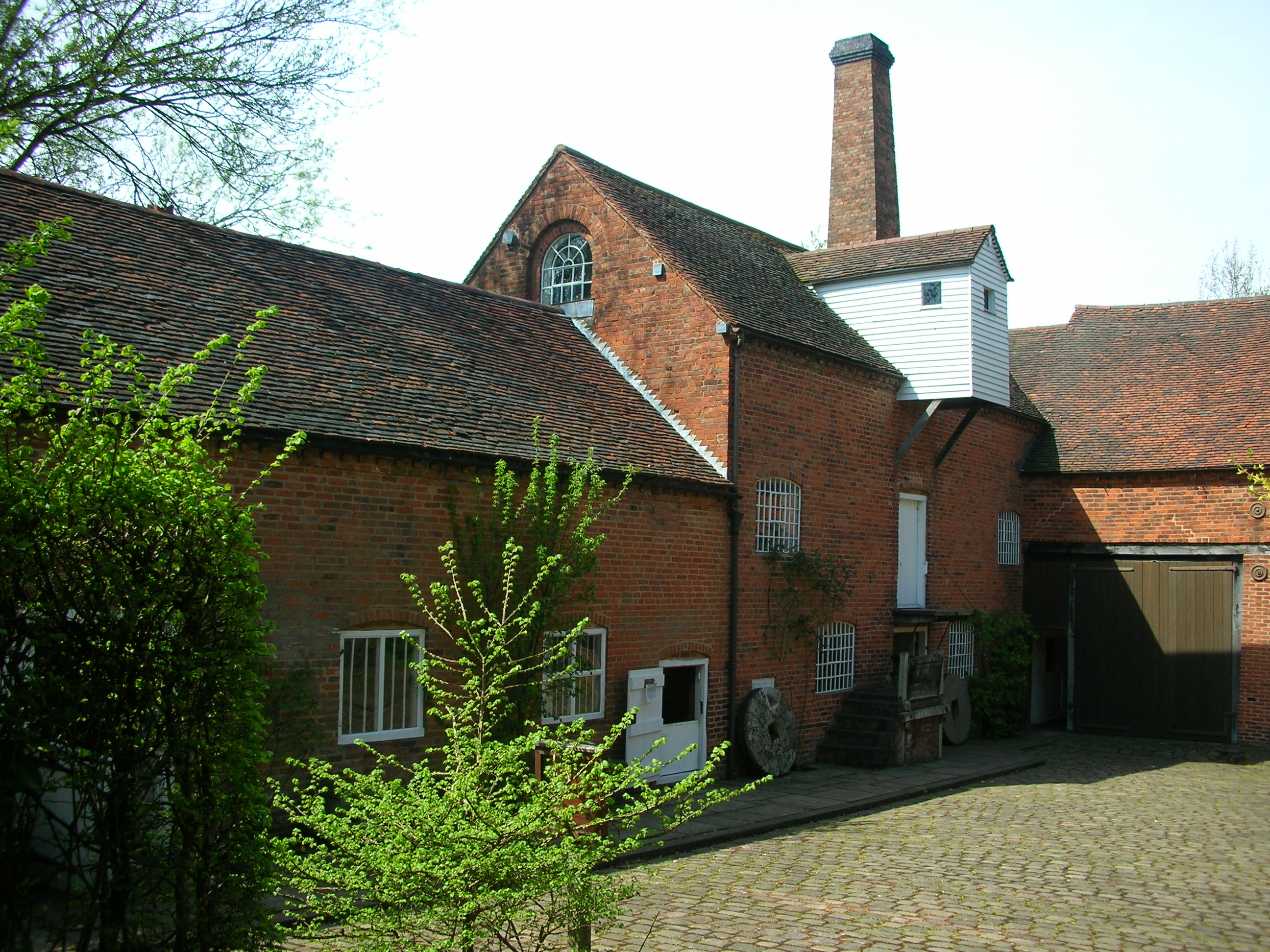
Sarehole Mill

Tolkien and his brother spent their childhood in Birmingham with their widowed mother. They first lived in the hamlet of Sarehole, which Tolkien said were the happiest years of his youth. Sarehole is said to have been the model for The Shire, home to the hobbits. Every year the Tolkien Weekend is held at Sarehole Recreation Ground and Moseley Bog Local Nature Reserve part of the Shire Country Park. 2005 commemorated the 50th anniversary of the release of The Lord of the Rings. Ronald and his brother spent many hours playing around Sarehole Mill and being chased away by the miller's son. The Mill features in The Hobbit when Bilbo Baggins runs "as fast as his furry feet could carry him down the lane, past the great Mill, across The Water and then on for a mile or more." In the 1960s Tolkien contributed to a public appeal to restore the mill which had become dilapidated. It is now a museum and is the only surviving water mill in the City's ownership.

Continuing to Green Lane ford which, like those at Slade and Scribbers Lane, has been concreted and the wooden footbridge is the latest of many, earlier ones have been swept away by sudden torrents. When the meadow below Green Road was opened as part of the riverside walk in the 1960s, the Cole was re-coursed and two weirs topped by step-stones were installed. Next, the river crosses the A3400, Stratford Road, the site of the former 13th-century Greet Mill, whose pool was the ponded river. In 1914 two brick bridges, over the river channel and a flood-race, were replaced by a two-arched brick bridge with a stone balustrade which allowed tramcars to cross the river and go on to Hall Green. The mill went out of use about 1843, was demolished and forgotten.

Between Stratford Road and Formans Road, known in the 14th century as Foulemoreslone and which used the Fole- or Fullford (foul ford) the stretch is known as Blackberry Way, being named after consultation with local residents and highly suitable, as this is one of the best blackberry picking sections of The Shire Country Park.

The river is bridged by the A41, Warwick Road at Greet, there is no documentary evidence for a ford here, and then continues north, passing under the Grand Union Canal and the Chiltern Main Line railway at Hay Mills close to the Ackers trust outdoor pursuits centre.

=== Kingfisher Country Park ===
Passing under Hay Mills bridge it crosses the A45, Coventry Road and from here eleven kilometres of the river and the Cole Valley are protected by the Kingfisher Country Park. The river now skirts south east of Birmingham city centre and, passing under the M6 motorway at Chelmsley Wood, heads north east again towards Coleshill, to which it gave its name.

The river has the potential to flood during heavy rain and the Stratford Roads' Greet Mill ford shows how treacherous the river could be after heavy rain as the assizes rolls of 1275 record that, Roger Fullard wishing to cross the water with his cart at the mill of Greet, by the flooding water, he and his horses were drowned. Babbs Mill Lake was created to balance the effect.

== See also ==
- Rivers of the United Kingdom
