= Hall Green =

Area of Birmingham, England

Coordinates: 52.434°N 1.839°W

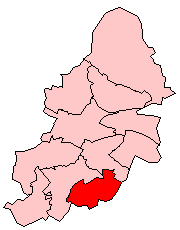
- Hall Green constituency shown within the city of Birmingham borough.

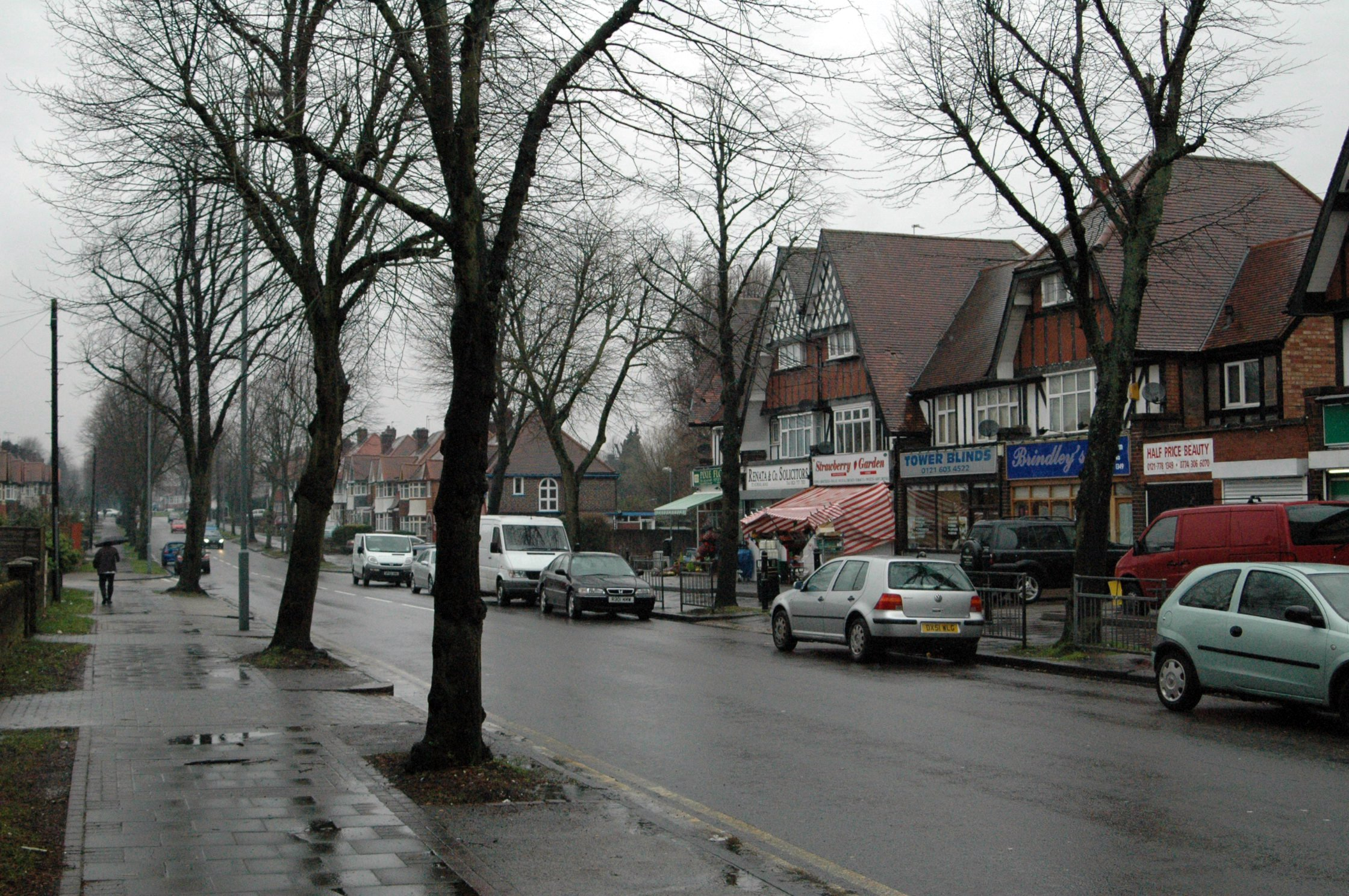
- Independent businesses in a shopping area of Hall Green

- Location within the West Midlands
- Population: 26,429 (2001)
  - Density: 4,867 per km²
- OS grid reference: SP106815
- Metropolitan borough: Birmingham
- Metropolitan county: West Midlands
- Region: West Midlands
- Country: England
- Sovereign state: United Kingdom
- Post town: BIRMINGHAM
- Postcode district: B28
- Dialling code: 0121
- Police: West Midlands
- Fire: West Midlands
- Ambulance: West Midlands
- UK Parliament: Birmingham Hall Green and Moseley

Hall Green is an area in southeast Birmingham, in the county of the West Midlands, England. It is also a council constituency of Birmingham City Council, managed by its own district committee. Historically it lay within the county of Worcestershire. The 2001 Population Census found that there were 25,921 people living in Hall Green with a population density of 4,867 people per km^{2}, this compares with 3,649 people per km^{2} for Birmingham.

The Shire Country Park runs past Sarehole Mill and along the course of the River Cole to Small Heath. Millstream Way passes through the park. Wildlife present at the country park include otters and water voles and many types of birds. The old village of Sarehole (now on the border of Hall Green and Moseley) is where J. R. R. Tolkien lived as a child and gained inspiration for the Hobbit's home "The Shire" as well as the book, The Lord of the Rings.

Hall Green was the home to Moor Green F.C., prior to an arson attack on the club's original Moorlands stadium in 2005, leading to the club moving their home games to Solihull Borough's Damson Park stadium, with the two clubs subsequently merging to become Solihull Moors. The local Moorlands stadium has since been demolished to make way for 'The Moorlands' housing estate.

Hall Green was also the home to the popular greyhound racing stadium and race course situated on the former Olympia Sports Ground, York Road called Hall Green Stadium; the stadium having won the BGRB Midlands and Western Region Racecourse of the Year for four consecutive years between 2000 and 2003. The stadium was closed by its owners Euro Property Investments Limited in July 2017 to make way for the 'Olympia' housing estate.

== History ==
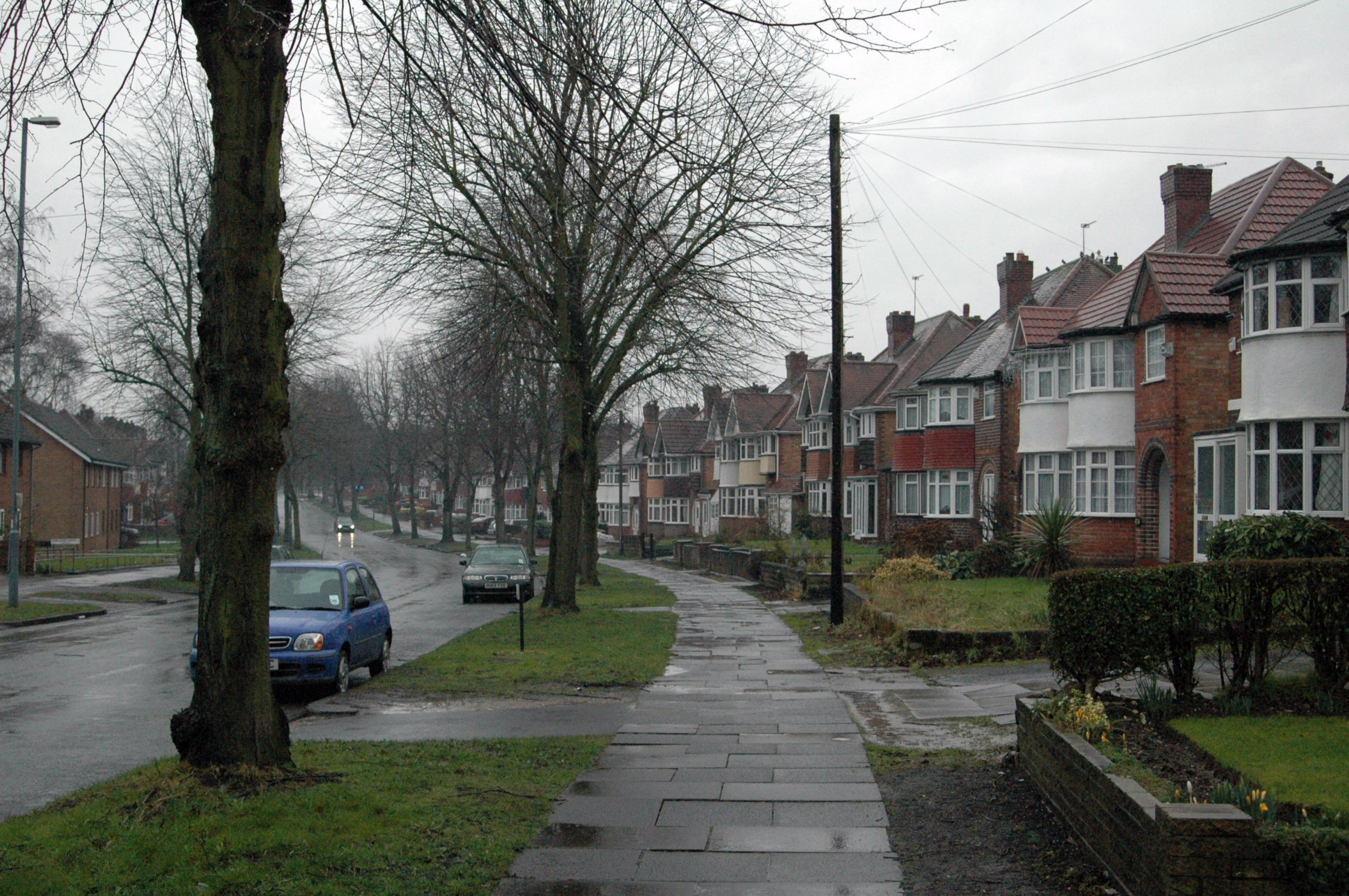
Semi-detached houses in Hall Green.

On School Road is the Church of the Ascension, formerly the Job Marston Chapel, which was built in 1704 and is believed to have been designed by Sir William Wilson. The chancel and transepts were added in 1860. The brick building consists of an exterior with a stone entablature and balustrade supported by Doric pilasters and the window architraves are of moulded stone. At the west end is a tower with an octagonal upper storey with a copper cupola. The interior of the nave is covered by a coved plaster ceiling. It is the earliest classical church to survive within the city boundary. Other historic buildings in Hall Green include Sarehole Mill, one of only two watermills in the city.

Highfield House was another historical building. It was built in 1850, making it the oldest house and the third oldest building in Hall Green. It was the farm house for Highfield Farm. The house was built in Georgian style with Neo-Classical features. It also retained the original sash windows. In March 2008, in the face of much public opposition, petitions, articles in local newspapers and items on radio stations, Birmingham City Council's Planning Committee approved plans for its demolition and the building of four houses and six apartments.

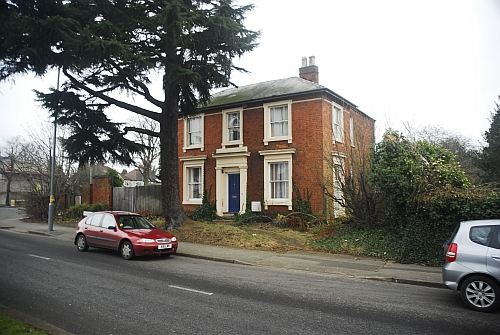
Highfield House (now demolished)

A private development named "The Hamlet" was built between 1883 and 1893. It consists of fourteen villas on Hamlet and Fox Hollies Roads, along with the Friends Meeting House on the Stratford Road. The architectural style of these brick and tile properties is typified by massive chimneys and timbers, leaded casements, and bracketed bays. It is believed that initially all the properties carried a moulded plaque bearing the initials 'MS' along with the date of construction but few of these plaques now remain. Whilst there is not a definite explanation for the 'MS' monogram, the most likely interpretation is that they stand for Marian Severne whose families land they were built on.

Petersfield Court, an Art Deco housing block containing 14 flats, was built in 1937. Built out of brick, it has rounded corner windows, made possible by the introduction of reinforced concrete. Later examples of architecture include the original Hall Green Technical College on the Stratford Road. It was designed by S. T. Walker and Partners in association with Alwyn Sheppard Fidler, the City architect for Birmingham. Built in 1958, it consists of a reinforced concrete framed classroom and an administration block clad with cedar boards and aluminium windows. Boarding was rarely used on educational buildings of this size at the time.

Otherwise, housing is largely inter-war. There are still a small number of independent locally run shops.

== Politics ==
Hall Green is part of the parliamentary constituency of Birmingham Hall Green and Moseley, which also includes the wards of Moseley and Kings Heath, Sparkbrook and Springfield; the Member of Parliament for the constituency is Tahir Ali of the Labour Party.

Hall Green is split into two wards: Hall Green North and Hall Green South. Hall Green North is represented by two Green Party councillors: Mansoor Qureshi and Haroon Salim. Hall Green South is represented by Conservative councillor Tim Huxtable.

== Education ==
Primary schools in Hall Green include Chilcote Primary School, Hall Green Infant School, Hall Green Junior School, Lakey Lane Primary School, St Ambrose Barlow RC Primary School, Robin Hood Academy and Yorkmead School. Rosslyn School is a private primary school located in the area.

Hall Green School is the main secondary school for the area, while South and City College Birmingham has a campus in Hall Green.

== Transport ==
Hall Green railway station is on the Birmingham to Stratford Line with some services also running between Kidderminster & Worcester Foregate Street and Stratford-Upon-Avon & Whitlocks End. It opened in 1908 and is currently operated by West Midlands Railway. National Express West Midlands and Diamond Bus operate a number of bus routes through the area, terminating in, Acocks Green, Digbeth, Erdington, Lyndon, Northfield, Perry Barr, Shirley, and Solihull.

== Famous residents ==
Hall Green has been a home to comedian Tony Hancock, who lived at 41 Southam Road until the age of three (the house contains a plaque commemorating this), racing commentator Murray Walker, who was born at 214 Reddings Lane (which is now a dentist's surgery), 1992 Formula One world champion Nigel Mansell, who though born in Upton-upon-Severn spent most of his childhood and early adult years in the area, comedian Joe Lycett who is believed to have later settled in Kings Heath in his own residence, former British number one tennis player Dan Evans, who grew up in the area, and J. R. R. Tolkien, who lived near Sarehole Mill, Birmingham's only working water mill.
