= Sarehole Mill =

Water mill on the River Cole in Hall Green, Birmingham, England

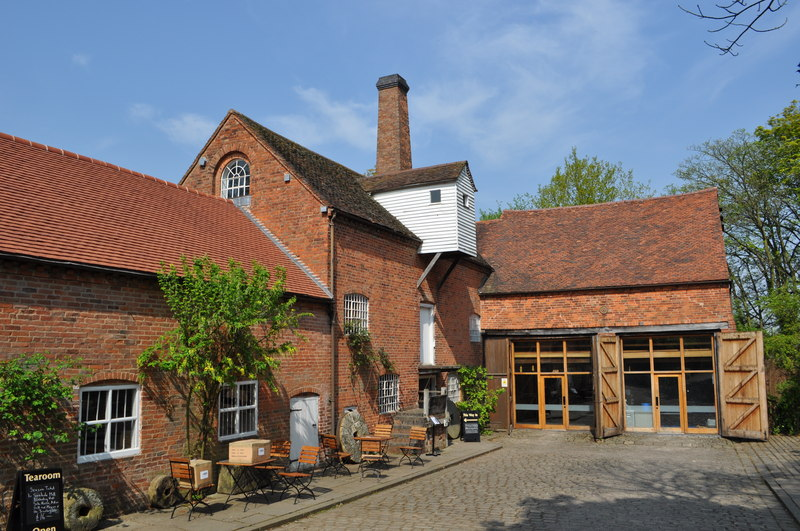
- Sarehole Mill

- Location in West Midlands
- 52°26′03″N 1°51′21″W
- Location: Hall Green, Birmingham
- OS grid reference: SP1005381833

History
- Built: 1771

Site notes
- Area: West Midlands
- Owner: Birmingham Museums Trust

Listed Building – Grade II
- Official name: Sarehole Mill
- Designated: 25 April 1952
- Reference no.: 1075631

Sarehole Mill is a Grade II listed water mill, in an area once called Sarehole, on the River Cole in Hall Green, Birmingham, England. It is now run as a museum by the Birmingham Museums Trust. It is known for its association with J. R. R. Tolkien and is one of only two working water mills in Birmingham, with the other being New Hall Mill in Walmley, Sutton Coldfield.

== History ==
Built in 1542 on the site of a previous mill, it was once known as Bedell's or Biddle's Mill after the name of an early owner, Samuel Biddle. In 1727 it was described as High Wheel Mill.

As early as 1755, the mill was leased by Matthew Boulton, one of the pioneers of the Industrial Revolution and leading figure of the Lunar Society for scientific experimentation. It is believed he converted the machinery for use in metal working. As well as milling grain it has been used for grinding bones for fertiliser, metal rolling (Matthew Boulton), tool sharpening and wire drawing.

The current building dates from 1771 and was in use until 1919. Thereafter it fell into a state of disrepair and dereliction. A local community campaign to save the mill was launched when demolition was mooted, and was finally successful with the mill being restored in 1969.

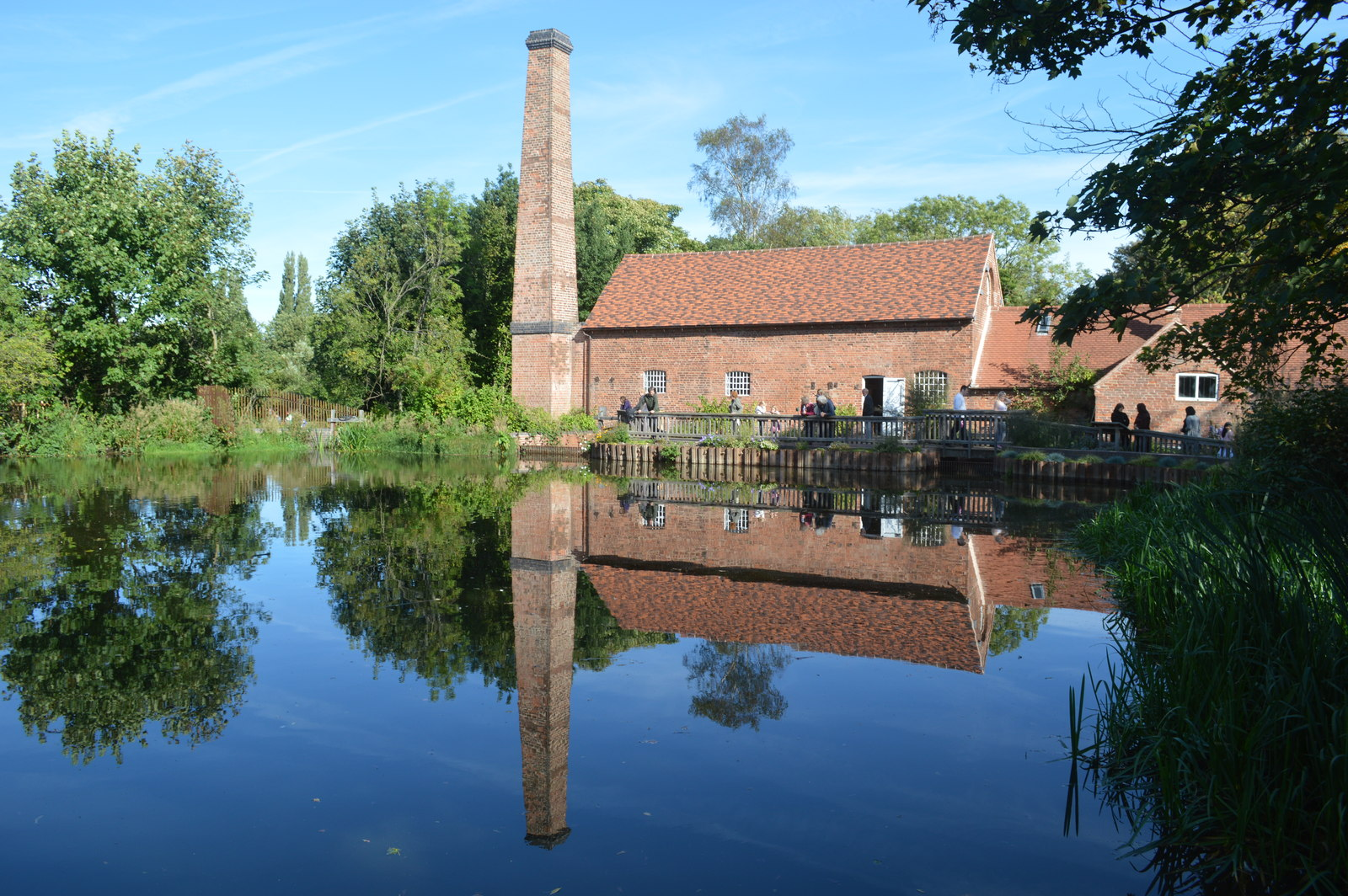
Sarehole Mill across the millpond

In April 2012 the millpond was drained to repair the sluice gates, and in the winter of 2012–13 the heavily silted mill pond was dredged.

In 2012/2013 Sarehole Mill underwent a £375,000 overhaul, in which the roof, chimney, millpond, water wheel and machinery were restored to produce flour again. A newly constructed outdoor bread oven is used regularly to bake bread using the flour ground on site. Sarehole Mill has a team of 10 volunteer millers, 15 volunteer gardeners and eight volunteer guides. The site received 14,383 visitors in 2019.

Flood damage during 2019 prevented the milling of flour on the site, with repairs beginning soon after.

In February 2020, the site's Victorian bakery was restored, and a permanent modern bakery was also installed. Baked goods were made available in the Millers Tea Room, and the original bakery is used for demonstrations of traditional baking techniques.

During the COVID-19 pandemic, the mill was temporarily closed, like all locations managed by the Birmingham Museums Trust but it has now reopened to visitors. The Mill is accessible by guided tour only. There are also Origins of Middle Earth tours available that explore the surrounding area's links to Tolkien.

== Steam engine ==
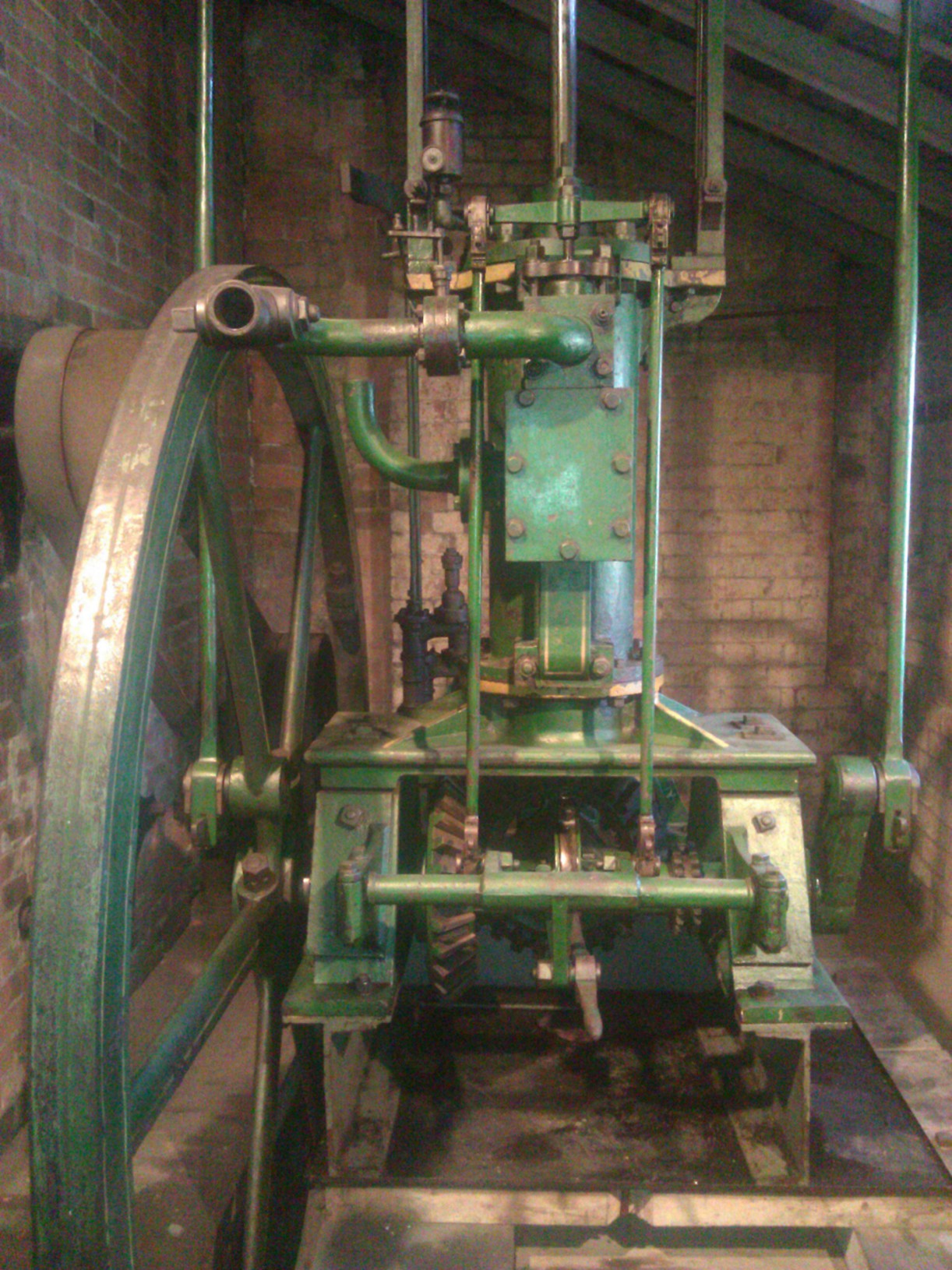
The steam engine at Sarehole Mill

In 1852 the water wheels at Sarehole Mill were supplemented by a single cylinder steam engine. Although water would have been the primary energy source powering the mill, the addition of a steam engine would have ensured uninterrupted operation of the mill. Unfortunately the original steam engine was at some point removed; the current engine is of similar size and capacity, being a single cylinder table engine of 16 hp (12 kW), albeit currently in a non-functioning state and of unknown manufacturer.

The current engine was installed as part of the restoration of the mill in 1975. It was formerly used by a sweet manufacturer, Smith Kendon Ltd, at their factories in England and Messina, Italy, where it was used up until 1948. It was donated to the Birmingham Museum of Science and Industry in 1952 before being moved to Sarehole.

== J. R. R. Tolkien ==
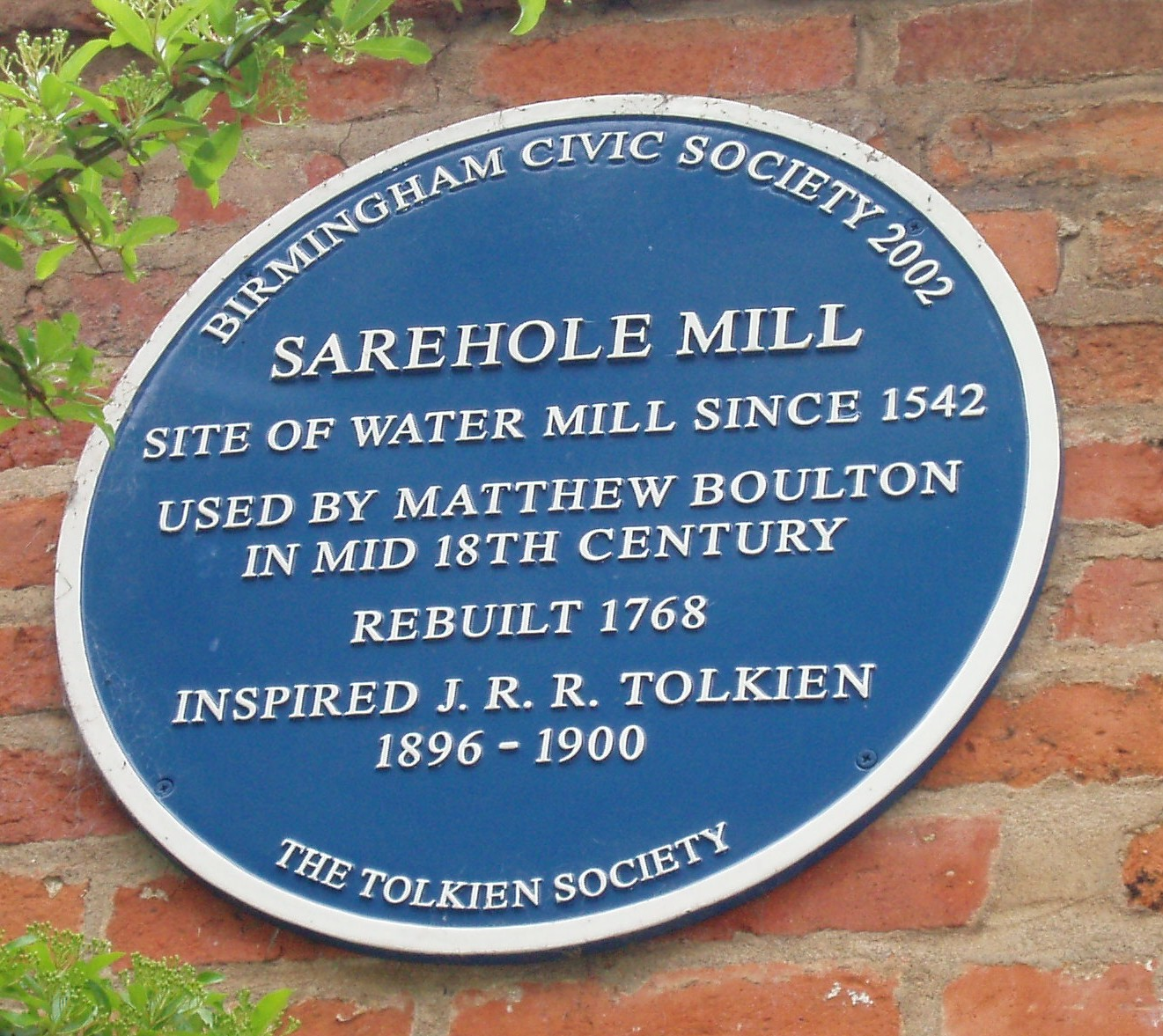
Sarehole Mill's blue plaque.

J. R. R. Tolkien lived within 300 yards of the mill at around the turn of century, between the ages four and eight, and would have seen it from his house. The locale at that time was rural Worcestershire farmland and countryside. He has also said that he used the mill as a location in The Lord of the Rings, for the Mill at Hobbiton. In an interview with Guardian journalist, John Ezard in 1966, before the mill's restoration, Tolkien said:

It was a kind of lost paradise... There was an old mill that really did grind corn with two millers, a great big pond with swans on it, a sandpit, a wonderful dell with flowers, a few old-fashioned village houses and, further away, a stream with another mill. I always knew it would go – and it did.

The mill is part of the Shire Country Park.

== Sources ==
- Birmingham, page 13, Douglas Hickman, 1970, Studio Vista Ltd.
- Hall Green and Hereabout, John Morris JONES, ed. Michael Byrne 1989
- Here and Then – The past of Our District, John Morris JONES,
- A Guide to the Buildings of Birmingham, Peter Leather, ISBN 0-7524-2475-0
