= Bull Street tram stop =

West Midlands Metro tram stop

Bull Street
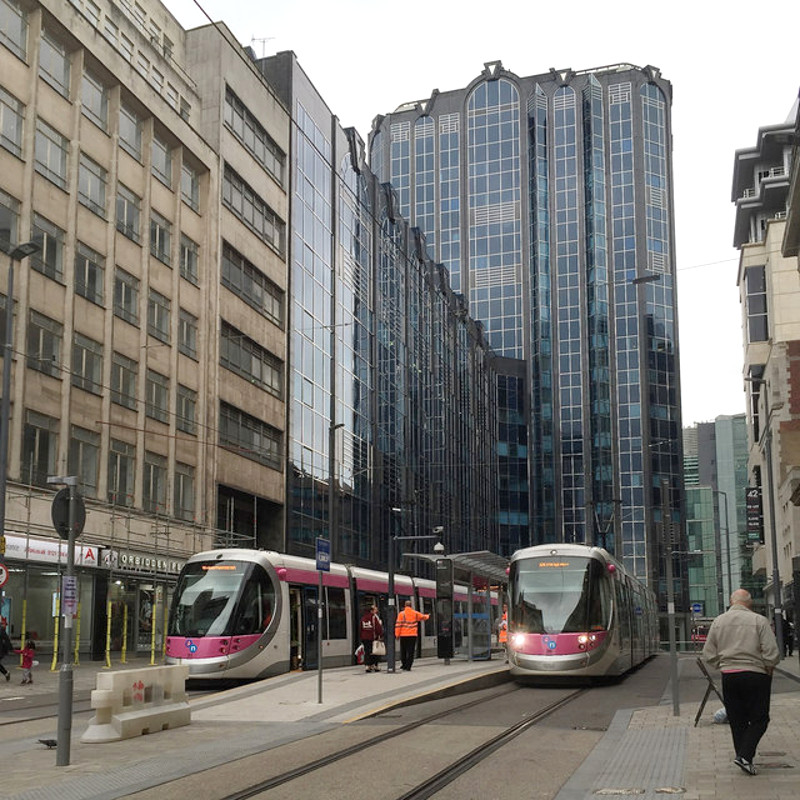
- CAF Urbos 3 trams calling at Bull Street, in May 2016, looking towards Wolverhampton

General information
- Location: Bull Street, Birmingham; England
- Coordinates: 52.481995°N 1.896472°W
- System: West Midlands Metro tram stop
- Line: Line 1 (Edgbaston Village/Millennium Point – Wolverhampton St George's/Wolverhampton Station)
- Platforms: 2

Other information
- Website: www.westmidlandsmetro.com/maps/stops/bull-street/

History
- Opened: 6 December 2015
Location

Bull Street tram stop is a tram stop on the West Midlands Metro tram system serving Bull Street in the Birmingham city centre, England. Construction started in June 2012, and it was opened on 6 December 2015, becoming the first stop of the city-centre extension to open, and the first on-street tram stop to operate in Birmingham since the closure of the Birmingham Corporation Tramways in 1953, and the temporary southern terminus of the service. The rest of the extension to Grand Central was opened on 30 May 2016, and then onto Edgbaston Village in July 2022. Work started on a new line to Birmingham Moor Street in 2022 which will be gradually extended to the eventual terminus at Birmingham Airport. To allow for the new connection to be made it became necessary to temporarily terminate all trams at Bull Street.

From 5 April 2026, trams going south from Bull Street either travel to Edgbaston or take the new line to a temporary terminus at Millennium Point, on the yet-to-be-completed line to Digbeth.

== Services ==
On Mondays to Fridays, West Midlands Metro services in each direction between Edgbaston Village/Millennium Point and Wolverhampton St George's/Wolverhampton Station run at six to eight-minute intervals during the day, and at fifteen-minute intervals during the evenings and on Sundays. They run at eight minute intervals on Saturdays.

Preceding station	West Midlands Metro	Following station
St Chads	Line 1	Corporation Street or Albert Street
