= Wednesbury bus station =

Bus station in Wednesbury, West Midlands, England

Coordinates: 52.552°N 2.024°W

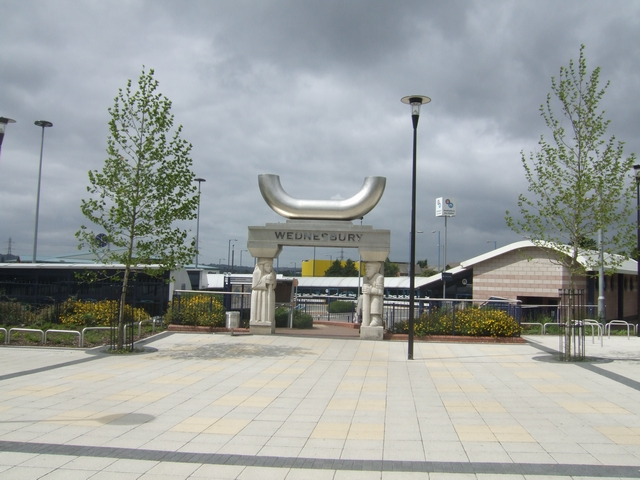

General information
- Location: Loxdale Street, Wednesbury; Sandwell
- Operator: Transport for West Midlands
- Bus stands: 10
- Bus operators: Carolean Coaches; Diamond West Midlands; National Express West Midlands; Walsall Community Transport
- Connections: Wednesbury Great Western Street tram stop

History
- Opened: October 2004
Location

Wednesbury bus station is a bus interchange in the town of Wednesbury, in the West Midlands region of England.
It is managed by Transport for West Midlands. Local bus services operated by various bus companies serve the bus station which has 12 departure stands. Wednesbury Great Western Street tram stop on the West Midlands Metro is a short walk away.

The rebuilt bus station opened in October 2004 as part of a major regeneration of the south side of Wednesbury town centre, which was completed three years later when a new Morrisons supermarket opened adjacent to the bus station.

== Bus routes ==
Route	Destination	Via	Operator
11/11A	Walsall Dudley	Pleck Tipton, Princes End, Ocker Hill	National Express West Midlands
23/23A	Willenhall	Moxley (23), Bradley (23A), Bilston, Portobello	Carolean Coaches
30	West Bromwich	Harvills Hawthorn, Great Bridge, Lyng	Diamond Bus
40 40	West Bromwich	Friar Park, Stone Cross	National Express West Midlands Diamond Bus
47	West Bromwich	Hateley Heath, Black Lake	National Express West Midlands
64	West Bromwich	Hill Top, Tantany	Diamond Bus
79	West Bromwich Wolverhampton	Hill Top, Black Lake Darlaston, Bilston	National Express West Midlands
310	Willenhall	Kings Hill, Darlaston, Rough Hay	Diamond Bus
674	Walsall	Friar Park, Yew Tree, Gillity Village	Walsall Community Transport
