= Wolverhampton tram stop =

Wolverhampton tram stop may refer to:

- Wolverhampton St George's tram stop
- Wolverhampton Station tram stop
