= Curzon Street railway station =

Curzon Street railway station may refer to:

- Birmingham Curzon Street railway station (1838–1966), closed railway station in England
- Birmingham Curzon Street railway station, under construction High Speed 2 railway station in England
