= Albert Street =

Albert Street may refer to:

== Roads ==
- Albert Street, Brisbane, Queensland, Australia
- Albert Street, Camden, London, England
- Albert Street, East Melbourne, Victoria, Australia
- Albert Street (Ottawa), Ontario, Canada
- Albert Street (Regina, Saskatchewan), Canada
- Albert Street, Riga, Latvia
- Albert Street (Singapore), Singapore (Road names in Singapore)

== Other uses ==
- Albert Street railway station, Brisbane, Australia
- Albert Street tram stop, Birmingham, England
