= Birmingham Snow Hill tram stop =

Birmingham Snow Hill tram stop may refer to:

- Birmingham Snow Hill railway station#Tram stops, tram stop from 1999 until 2015
- St Chads tram stop, opened in 2016 as Snow Hill being renamed in 2017
