= Albert Street tram stop =

West Midlands Metro tram stop

Albert Street
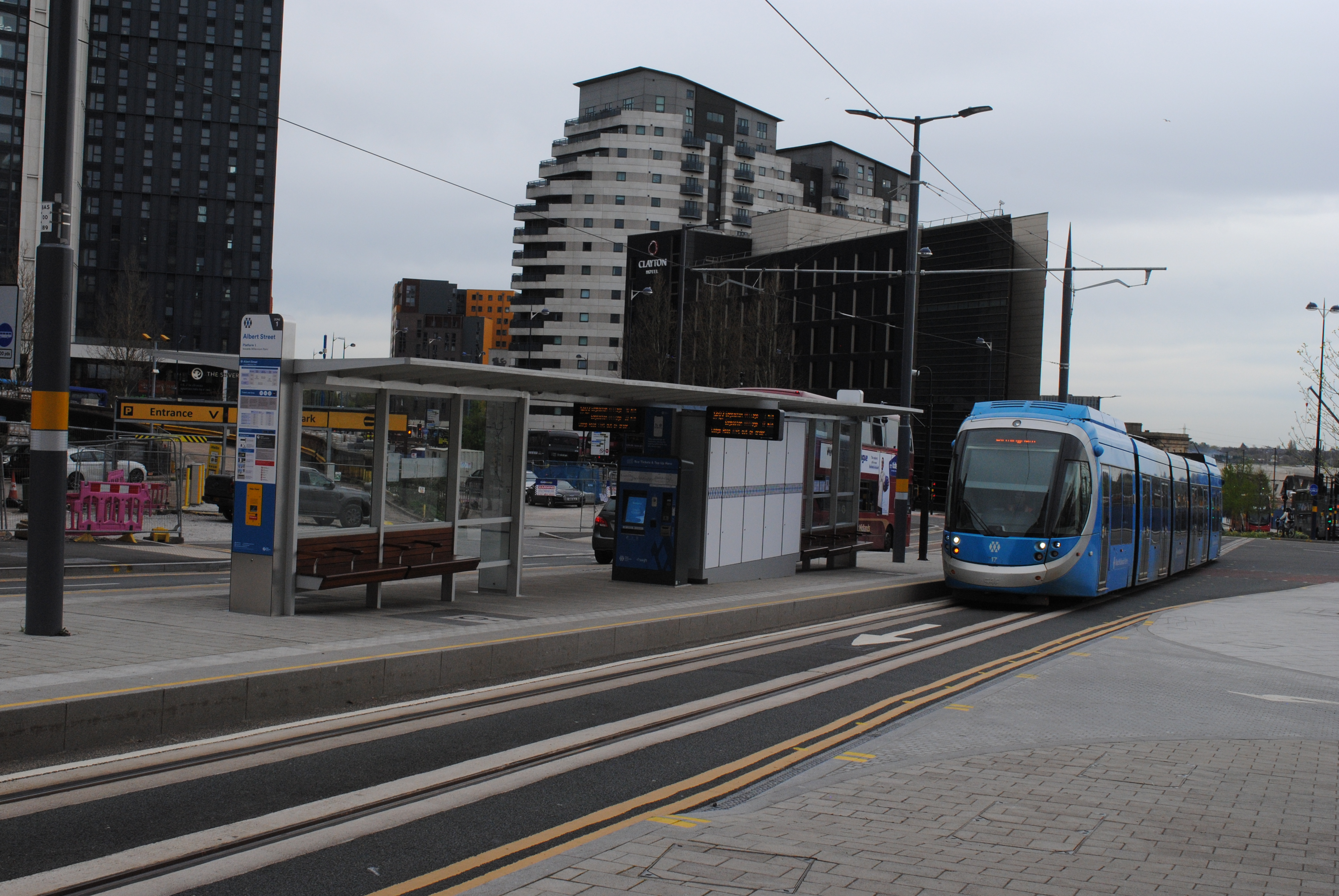
- Tram from Millennium Point, arriving at Albert Street on 9 April 2026. The tram is on battery power, with its pantograph lowered.

General information
- Location: Birmingham; England
- Coordinates: 52.4804°N 1.8926°W
- System: West Midlands Metro tram stop
- Line: Line 1
- Platforms: 2

Other information
- Website: www.westmidlandsmetro.com/maps/stops/albert-street/

History
- Opened: 5 April 2026
Location

Albert Street tram stop is a tram stop on Line 1 of the West Midlands Metro serving Birmingham Moor Street and the adjacent bus interchange, it is located in Birmingham City Centre, England.

== History ==
The station opened on 5 April 2026 along with the Millennium Point stop. These are the first tram stops opened on the extension to Digbeth.

Creation of the line and stop required the demolition of a row of retail buildings on the south side of Dale End, and the realignment of Albert Street through the site where they once stood.

== Facilities ==
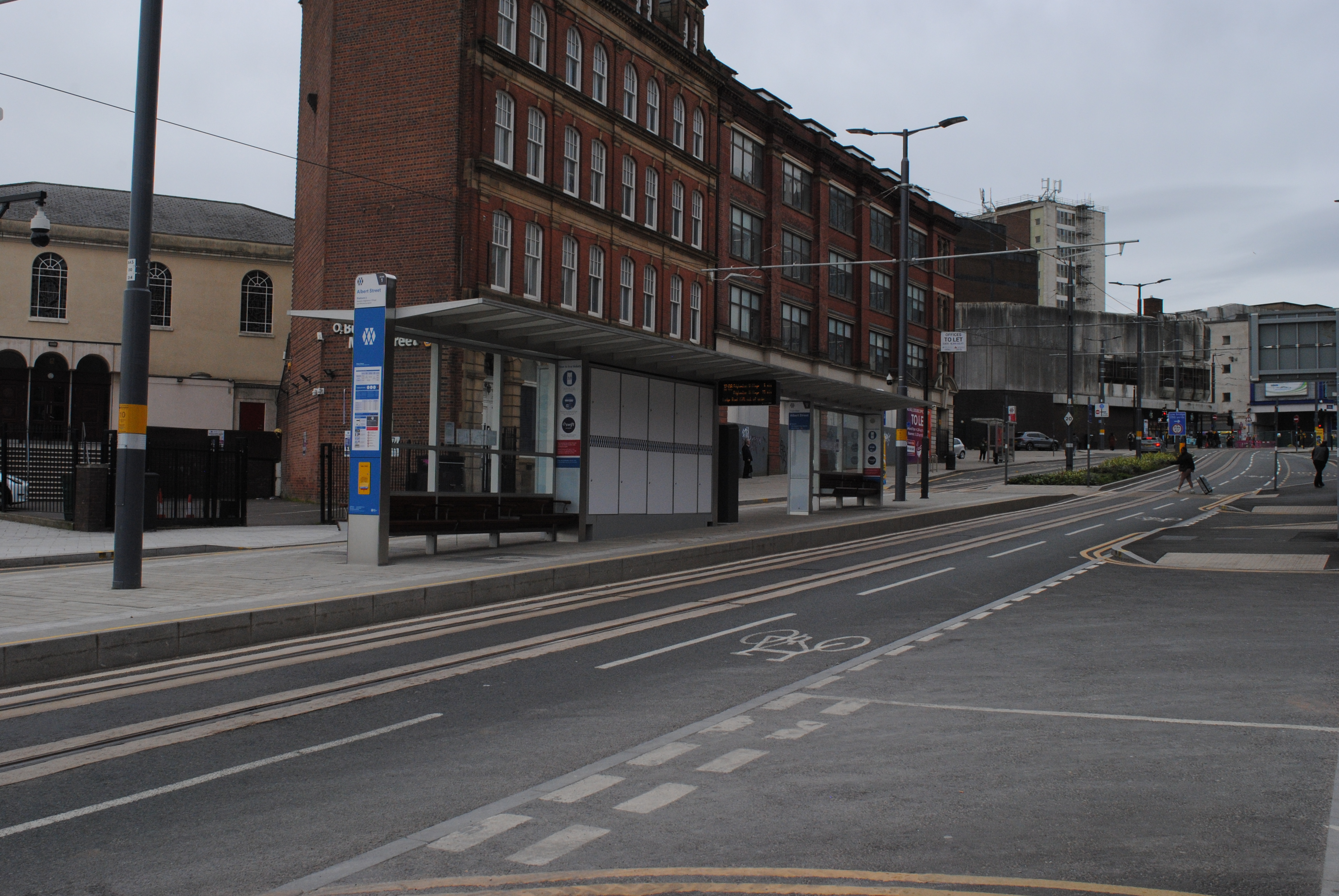
Albert Street tram stop, looking west, towards Bull Street

The stop has a shelter and ticket machines, located on a single island platform and is fully wheelchair accessible.

== Services ==
Services from the tram stop run to Millennium Point in one direction and Edgbaston in the other, with services starting at 5am and running to midnight, every 8-15 minutes.

Trams between here and Millennium Point run on battery power, the overhead wiring ending just east of the stop.

| Preceding station | West Midlands Metro | Following station |
|---|---|---|
| Bull Street or Corporation Street | Line 1 | Millennium Point |

== Interchanges ==
The tram stop serves Birmingham Moor Street and the adjacent bus interchange.
