= Birmingham Curzon Street railway station =

HS2 station under construction in the West Midlands, England

Birmingham Curzon Street
- Future station layout and relation to the city

General information
- Location: Birmingham, England
- Coordinates: 52.4815°N 1.8853°W
- Grid reference: SP078870
- Platforms: 7

Key dates
- 2036–2039: Planned opening
Location

Birmingham Curzon Street is the planned northern railway terminus of High Speed 2 in central Birmingham, West Midlands, England. The new railway will connect the city with London Euston, via Birmingham Interchange and Old Oak Common. Curzon Street will have seven terminal platforms and was planned originally to open in 2026. However, delays have pushed this back to 2036–2039.

The station, the design for which has been developed by WSP and Grimshaw Architects, will be surrounded by new public spaces, include a pedestrian link to the adjacent Birmingham Moor Street railway station, and be integrated with an extended West Midlands Metro tram network.

Birmingham City Council plans to use the new station's location to promote development across the city, particularly the redevelopment of the Eastside and Digbeth areas.

== History ==
=== Site ===
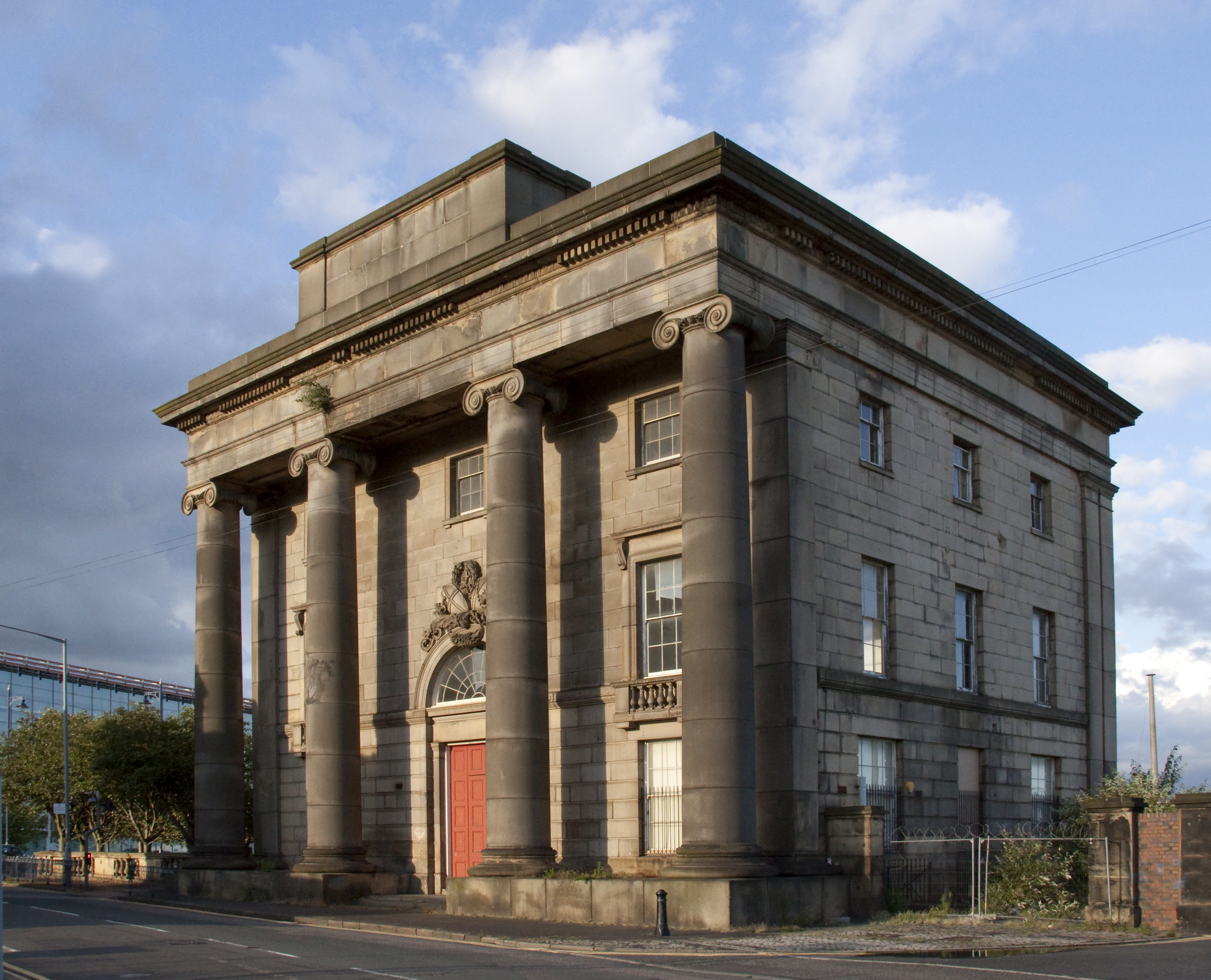
The 1838 station's entrance building, to be incorporated into the design

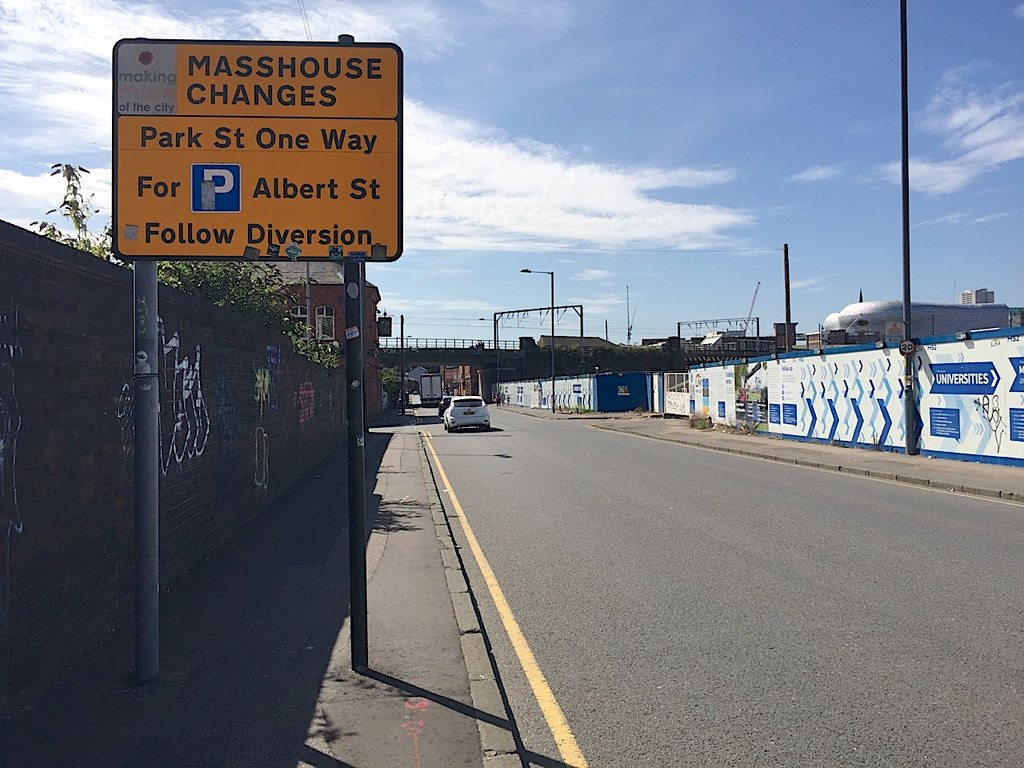
New Canal Street. Parts of the HS2 Curzon Street station site extend behind barriers on both sides of the road.

The station is being constructed on land bounded by Curzon Street, Eastside Park & Moor Street Queensway, built partially on the site of the former Curzon Street station, historically the first station serving London to Birmingham trains. The remaining Classical stone entrance building is now a Grade I listed building, applied by Historic England for "buildings of exceptional interest". It will be refurbished and incorporated into the new station arrangements.

The site is located to the east of the city centre, in the Eastside and Digbeth areas, in the valley of the river Rea. It was densely developed until the late 20th century and is the most historically industrialised area of the city; the Grand Union Canal arrived in the 18th century, and the London and North Western, Midland and Great Western railways were all built through this part of the city in the 19th century.

The character of the site and surroundings has been in transition in recent years. Eastside has focused on learning and innovation; it is home to Birmingham City University, Aston University, and the ThinkTank science museum. Digbeth is covered by a conservation area, which marks it as historically important for its distinct character. Digbeth has become an arts and technology hub. The Digbeth Branch Canal is located to the east of the site, connecting to the wider city network.

A large proportion of the site has remained brownfield or car parking, retaining only remnants of its previous industrial use. The site was also the location of the Park Street Gardens Burial Grounds, which have been removed as part of the site remediation works. As well as the entrance of the 1838 station, the neighbouring Grade II listed pub, The Woodman, will be incorporated into the redevelopment; the Fox & Grapes, a listed pub previously situated on Park Street, was demolished in 2018, which attracted strong criticism.

== Design ==
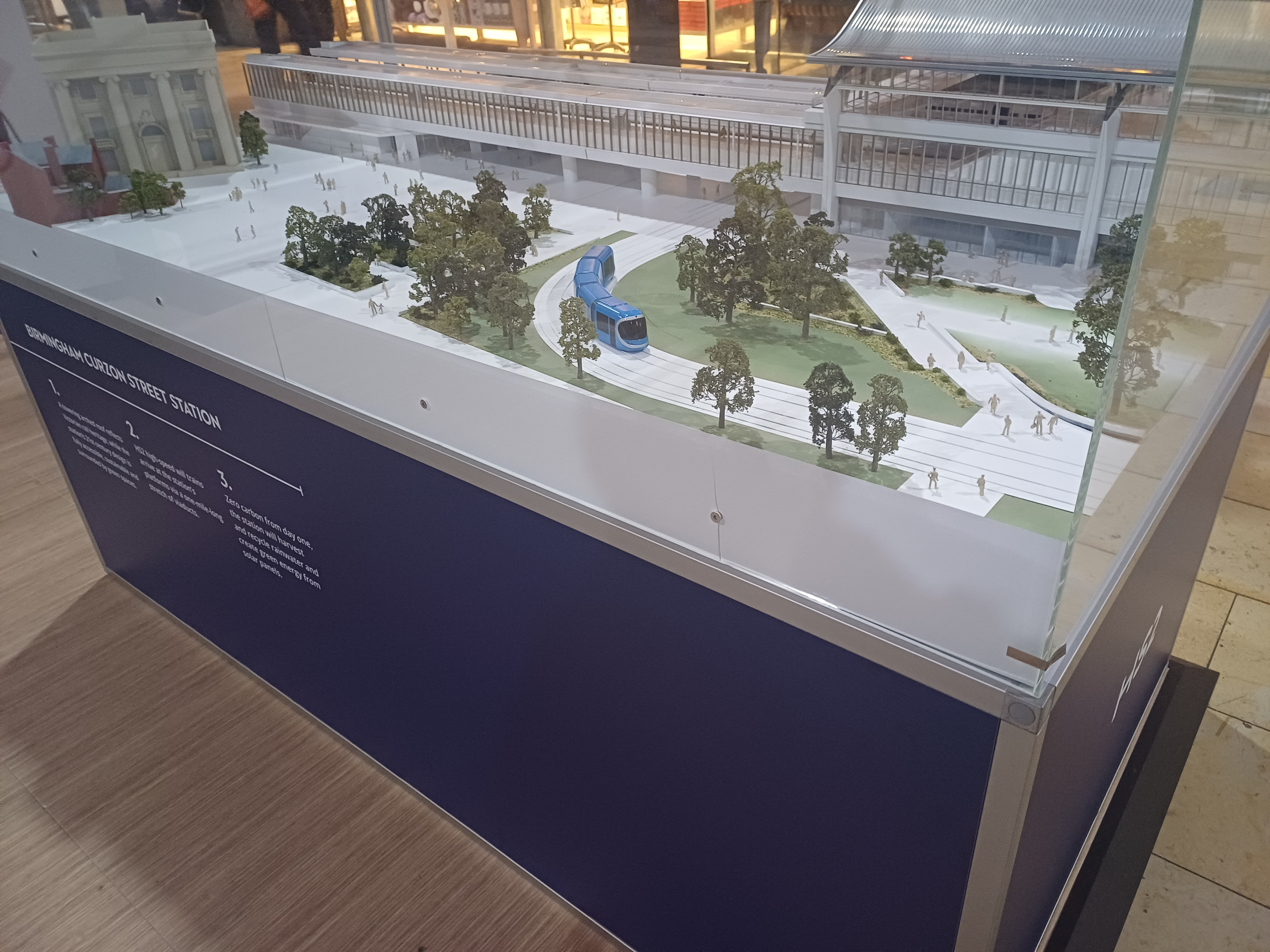
A model of Curzon Street station on display at London Paddington, 2024

The design for Curzon Street station was developed by the consultancy WSP and Grimshaw Architects for High Speed 2. Initial designs were consulted on in autumn 2018 and evolved ones in January 2020. The station building is roughly oriented north-east to south-west. The principal train shed consists of an arched roof, intended as the architectural signature of the station, clad in metal panels with a significant projection at both the eastern and western ends of approximately 35 m (115 ft). The railway line will continue eastwards elevated on a viaduct over Park Street and New Canal Street, with retail, trams and public space beneath.

The old Curzon Street station will be incorporated into the eastern entrance of the new station; a masonry colonnade screen will connect the historic structure and the new HS2 station viaducts with the eastern concourse at New Canal Street. The renovated building will have a visitor centre and office space that will be used by HS2 Ltd, Birmingham City University and Historic England.

The design also improves access to different modes of transport: the West Midlands Metro tram service will run alongside and underneath the station. At the same time, accessible pedestrian routes lead to local bus services, Sprint rapid transit bus services and train services at nearby Moor Street. Bicycle parking has also been incorporated, providing 550 spaces. The new station is planned to be net zero carbon in operation, and is designed to meet BREEAM Excellent, an industry standard for buildings that reduce energy usage and materials waste, and minimise impact on the natural environment.

== Construction ==
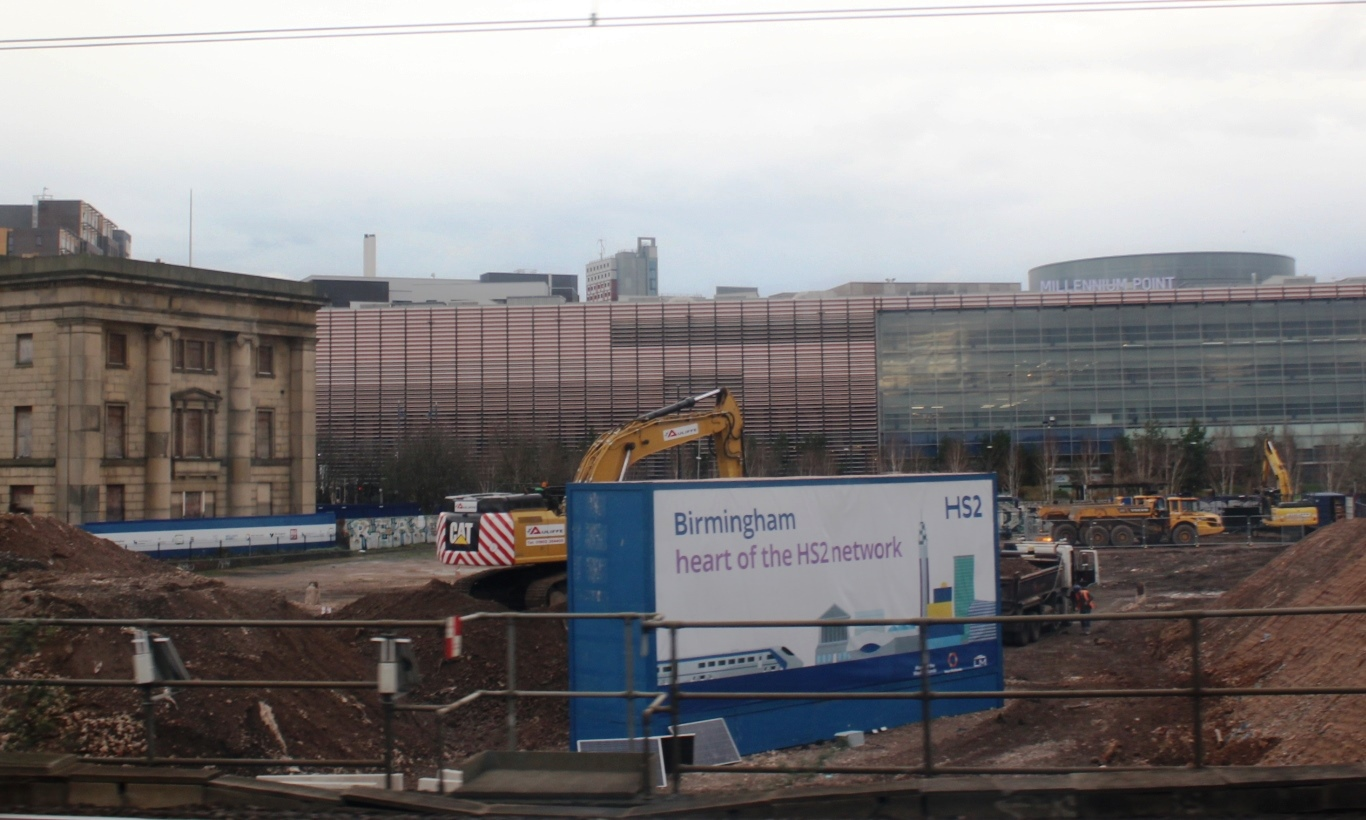
Site clearance underway in January 2020

At the start of 2019, the site was cleared. As at all HS2 sites, site clearance was followed by an extensive archaeological programme, in this case involving 70 archaeologists, which unearthed what is thought to be the world's oldest railway roundhouse adjacent to the old Curzon Street station. Built to a design by the 19th-century engineer Robert Stephenson, the roundhouse was operational on 12 November 1837; it predates the previous titleholder of the world's oldest in Derby by almost two years. Other demolitions and ground investigations are preparing the site for construction, and utility diversions are set to begin in summer 2020.

HS2 opened the tender for the main construction contractor in January 2020 for £571 million. HS2 was forced to halt the original procurement process the previous July due to a "lower-than-anticipated market appetite" from bidders.

In April 2020, planning permission for the new station, including concourses, roof, viaduct, and platforms, was granted by the city council, the first HS2 station to gain it. The council's report concluded "the station design is truly world class. The elegant and deceptively simple form of the main building clearly reads as a railway station and harks back to traditional station architecture, delivering this in a confident and contemporary way".

In June 2020, HS2 announced that Laing O’Rourke, a pairing of Mace and Dragados, and a joint venture between BAM Nuttall and Ferrovial had been shortlisted for the contract to build the station. It was confirmed in May 2021 that Mace Dragados had won the contract, in a deal worth up to £570 million. Mace Dragados is working with HS2 Ltd in two stages to finalise the detailed design and then build the station.

In March 2026, the installation of 2,011 concrete piles between 6 and 24 m (20 and 79 ft) deep was completed at the site.
