= Grand Central tram stop =

West Midlands Metro tram stop

Grand Central
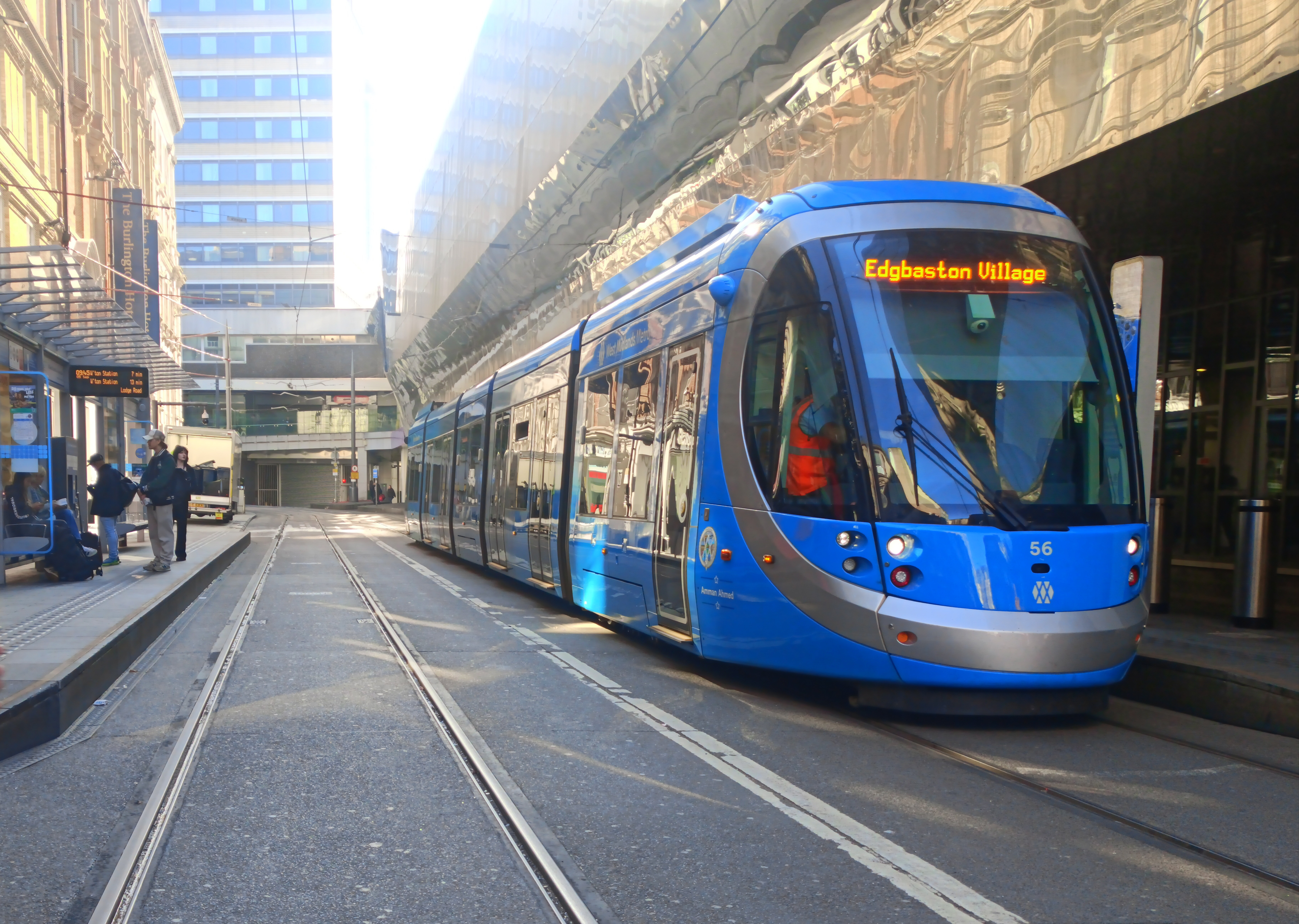
- Tram 56 calling at the stop

General information
- Location: Stephenson Street, Birmingham; England
- Coordinates: 52.4786°N 1.8992°W
- System: West Midlands Metro tram stop
- Line: Line 1 (Edgbaston Village/Millennium Point – Wolverhampton St George's/Wolverhampton Station)
- Platforms: 2

Other information
- Website: www.westmidlandsmetro.com/maps/stops/grand-central/

History
- Opened: 30 May 2016
Location

Grand Central tram stop is a tram stop on the city-centre extension of Line 1 of the West Midlands Metro. It opened on 30 May 2016 as the terminus of the line on Stephenson Street outside the shopping centre from which its name was derived and Birmingham New Street station.

In October 2013 Birmingham City Council voted to extend the line, adding two additional stops beyond Grand Central, at Town Hall and Library. This opened in December 2019. In July 2022 the line was further extended to Edgbaston Village.

Preceding station	West Midlands Metro	Following station
Corporation Street	Line 1	Town Hall
