= List of West Midlands Metro tram stops =

The West Midlands Metro is a light-rail/tram line in the West Midlands of England operating between Birmingham and Wolverhampton via West Bromwich and Wednesbury. It is owned and operated by Transport for West Midlands.

It opened on 30 May 1999, mostly using the former disused Birmingham Snow Hill to Wolverhampton Low Level Line. An extension into Birmingham City Centre was approved in 2012, and is now fully operational.

== Existing stops ==
=== Line 1 ===
Station	Photo	Opened	Co-ordinates (Links to map resources)	Notes	Usage
Edgbaston Village		17 July 2022	52.47201°N 1.92351°W	Terminus	
Five Ways		17 July 2022	52.47472°N 1.91526°W	Connection with Five Ways mainline station.	
Brindleyplace		17 July 2022	52.47671°N 1.91239°W		
Library		11 December 2019	52.4786°N 1.9083°W	Near to Library of Birmingham.	
Town Hall		11 December 2019	52.4792°N 1.9033°W	Near to Birmingham Town Hall and Victoria Square.	
Grand Central		30 May 2016	52.4798°N 1.8972°W	Connection with Birmingham New Street mainline station.	
Corporation Street		30 May 2016	52.4798°N 1.8972°W		
Albert Street		5 April 2026	52.4804°N 1.8927°W	Connections with Birmingham Moor Street mainline station	
Millennium Point		5 April 2026	52.4808°N 1.8898°W	Temporary terminus	
Bull Street		6 December 2015	52.481995°N 1.896472°W		
St Chads		2 June 2016	52.48450°N 1.90032°W	Connection with Birmingham Snow Hill mainline station. Replaced the former Snow Hill stop	8581
St Paul's		31 May 1999	52.48716°N 1.90470°W		
Jewellery Quarter		31 May 1999	52.48990°N 1.91421°W	Connection with National Rail	
Soho Benson Road		31 May 1999	52.49697°N 1.93092°W		
Winson Green Outer Circle		31 May 1999	52.49894°N 1.93927°W		
Handsworth Booth Street		31 May 1999	52.50210°N 1.95229°W	Site of Handsworth and Smethwick railway station (closed 1972).	
The Hawthorns		31 May 1999	52.50582°N 1.96506°W	Connection with National Rail	
Kenrick Park		31 May 1999	52.50868°N 1.98251°W		
Trinity Way		31 May 1999	52.51187°N 1.98823°W		
West Bromwich Central		31 May 1999	52.51652°N 1.99466°W	Site of West Bromwich railway station	
Lodge Road West Bromwich Town Hall		31 May 1999	52.51865°N 1.99987°W		439
Dartmouth Street		31 May 1999	52.52046°N 2.00450°W		
Dudley Street Guns Village		31 May 1999	52.52512°N 2.00851°W		
Black Lake		31 May 1999	52.53096°N 2.01114°W		
Wednesbury Great Western Street		31 May 1999	52.54892°N 2.02563°W		
Wednesbury Parkway		31 May 1999	52.54968°N 2.03202°W		
Bradley Lane		31 May 1999	52.55603°N 2.05784°W		
Loxdale		31 May 1999	52.56007°N 2.06589°W		
Bilston Central		31 May 1999	52.56546°N 2.07470°W		
The Crescent		31 May 1999	52.56795°N 2.08086°W		
Priestfield		31 May 1999	52.57191°N 2.09798°W		
The Royal		31 May 1999	52.58107°N 2.11711°W		
Wolverhampton St George's		31 May 1999	52.58401°N 2.12451°W	Terminus.	6167
Pipers Row		17 September 2023	52.58510°N 2.12288°W	Connection with Wolverhampton bus station	
Wolverhampton Station		17 September 2023	52.5875°N 2.1200°W	Connection with National Rail; Terminus	

== Former stops ==
=== Line 1 ===
Station	Photo	Co-ordinates (Links to map resources)	Notes	Usage
Snow Hill		52.483°N 1.899°W	Opened 31 May 1999; closed 24 October 2015; Replaced by St Chads	
