= St Chads tram stop =

West Midlands Metro tram stop

St Chads
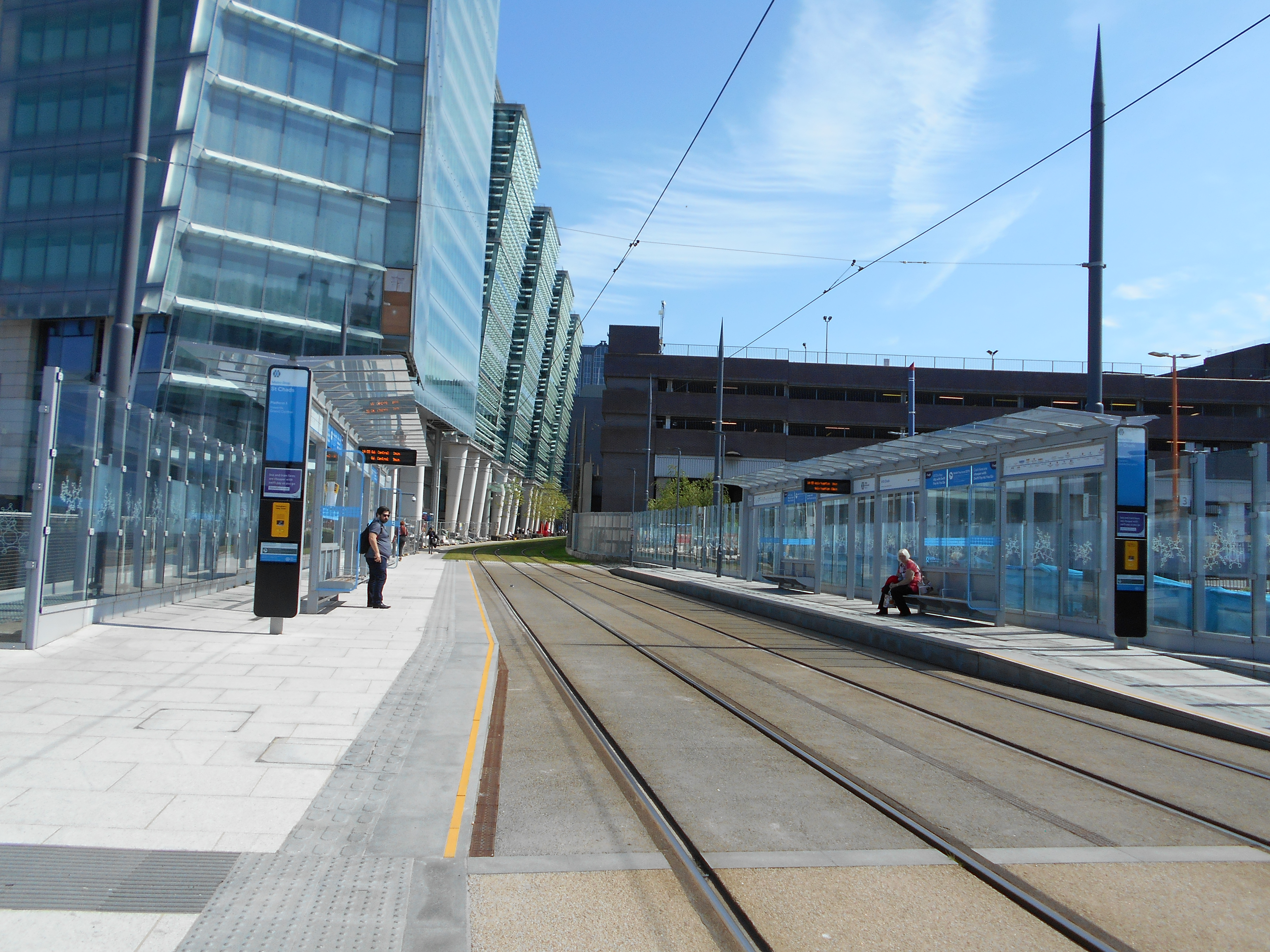
- St Chads stop with Birmingham Snow Hill station in the background

General information
- Location: Queensway, Birmingham; England
- Coordinates: 52.484729°N 1.900335°W
- System: West Midlands Metro tram stop
- Line: Line 1 (Edgbaston Village/Millennium Point-Wolverhampton St George's/Wolverhampton Station)
- Platforms: 2

History
- Opened: 2 June 2016
Location

St Chads tram stop is a tram stop on the city-centre extension of Line 1 of the West Midlands Metro in the United Kingdom, adjacent to Snow Hill railway station.

== History ==
It opened on 2 June 2016 as part of the extension into Birmingham city centre as a replacement for the previous Snow Hill terminus tram stop. Initially named Snow Hill, it was renamed St Chads in January 2017, taking the name from the nearby St Chad's Cathedral, because on opening the necessary work to allow direct access with Snow Hill railway station had not been completed, and the Snow Hill name was considered confusing for passengers. Bull Street was instead advertised as the principal interchange, its platforms being closer to the main entrance of the rail station.

== Opening ==
When opened the stop could only be accessed by a walkway alongside the tracks from the city centre. Stairs and a lift connecting the stop to the street below were completed in September 2017.

== Expansion ==
In December 2018 it was announced that a new entrance would be constructed at Snow Hill station, by opening up an arch in the railway viaduct. This will allow direct interchange between St Chads tram stop and Snow Hill railway station. The work was due to begin in Summer 2019. The entrance has since opened to the public for the connection with the tram stop.

== Services ==
On Mondays to Fridays, West Midlands Metro services in each direction between Edgbaston Village and Wolverhampton St George's/Wolverhampton Station run at six to eight-minute intervals during the day, and at fifteen-minute intervals during the evenings and on Sundays. They run at eight minute intervals on Saturdays.

Some southbound services run to a temporary terminus at Millennium Point, on the yet-to-be completed new line to Digbeth.

Preceding station	West Midlands Metro	Following station
St Paul's	Line 1	Bull Street
