= Wednesbury Great Western Street tram stop =

West Midlands Metro tram stop

Coordinates: 52.54892°N 2.02563°W

Wednesbury Great Western Street
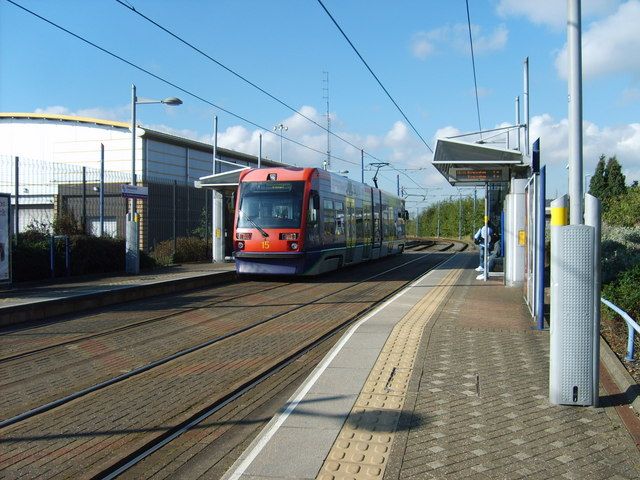

General information
- Location: Wednesbury; Sandwell; England
- System: West Midlands Metro tram stop
- Line: Line 1 (Edgbaston Village/Millennium Point – Wolverhampton St George's/Wolverhampton Station)
- Platforms: 2

History
- Opened: 31 May 1999

Passengers
- 2015/16: Approx. 1,500 daily
Location

Wednesbury Great Western Street tram stop is a tram stop in Wednesbury, Sandwell, England. It was opened on 31 May 1999 and is situated on West Midlands Metro Line 1. The stop is next to the West Midlands Metro tram depot.

The stop and depot are on the site of the old Wednesbury Central railway station, which closed in 1972, though the section of railway on which the tram stop currently stands remained open to goods trains until 1992.

The stop is overlooked by a statue of Sleipnir, Odin's mythical eight-legged horse, by Steve Field, commissioned by Altram, the company that built the West Midlands Metro.

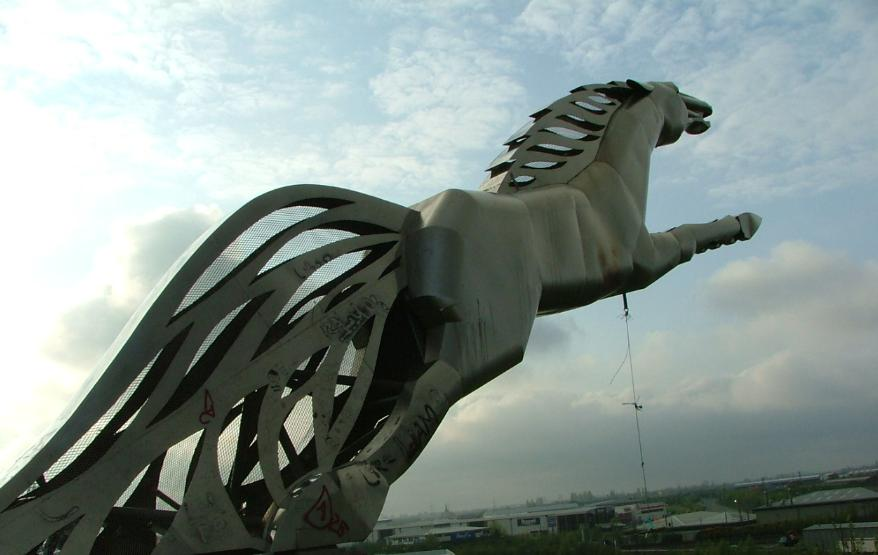
Sleipnir by Steve Field

== Services ==
On Mondays to Fridays, West Midlands Metro services in each direction between Edgbaston Village and Wolverhampton St George's/Wolverhampton Station run at six to eight-minute intervals during the day, and at fifteen-minute intervals during the evenings and on Sundays. They run at eight minute intervals on Saturdays. Since 5 April 2026, some southbound services are running to a temporary terminus at Millennium Point, on the yet-to-be completed new line to Digbeth.

Starting at earliest in December 2026, services will alternate between Wolverhampton and Dudley after the extension to Flood Street opens. This will lead into Brierley Hill in 2028.

Preceding station	West Midlands Metro	Following station
Wednesbury Parkway	Line 1	Black Lake
	Future services	
Wednesbury Parkway	West Midlands Metro	Black Lake or Great Bridge

== South Staffordshire Line ==
The South Staffordshire Line which is currently closed, is crossed over by the West Midlands Metro. Wednesbury Great Western Street will also be the northern end of Tipton Junction, which will connect with the future Dudley Extension. This will utilize the railway line to the former station sites at Great Bridge North railway station, Dudley Port railway station and Dudley railway station before running through Dudley town centre and will reconnect to the line at Canal Street before finally leaving the line around Harts Hill railway station, towards Merry Hill Shopping Centre and Brierley Hill.

This line may also be used by heavy rail between Walsall and it will run the entire track to Round Oak. This could make it the second West Midlands Metro scheme to share a trackbed with heavy rail. With the other being the shared trackbed between The Hawthorns and Birmingham Snow Hill railway station. There is also potential for a service between Wolverhampton and Wednesbury, via Walsall, which would use the line between Walsall railway station and the former Wednesbury Town railway station, along with the majority of the Wolverhampton and Walsall Railway. Transport for West Midlands are currently undertaking a feasibility scheme into the possibility of an extension to Stourbridge, with stops at Brockmoor, Brettell Lane railway station, Amblecote, Stourbridge Junction and Stourbridge Town.

A short walk away is the site of another former railway line which served the former Patent Shaft steel works and continued through Darlaston. The distinct GWR goods sheds are still standing.
