= Sprint (West Midlands) =

Future bus transit

Sprint is a bus rapid transit scheme under construction in the West Midlands, England. The project is developed by Transport for West Midlands.

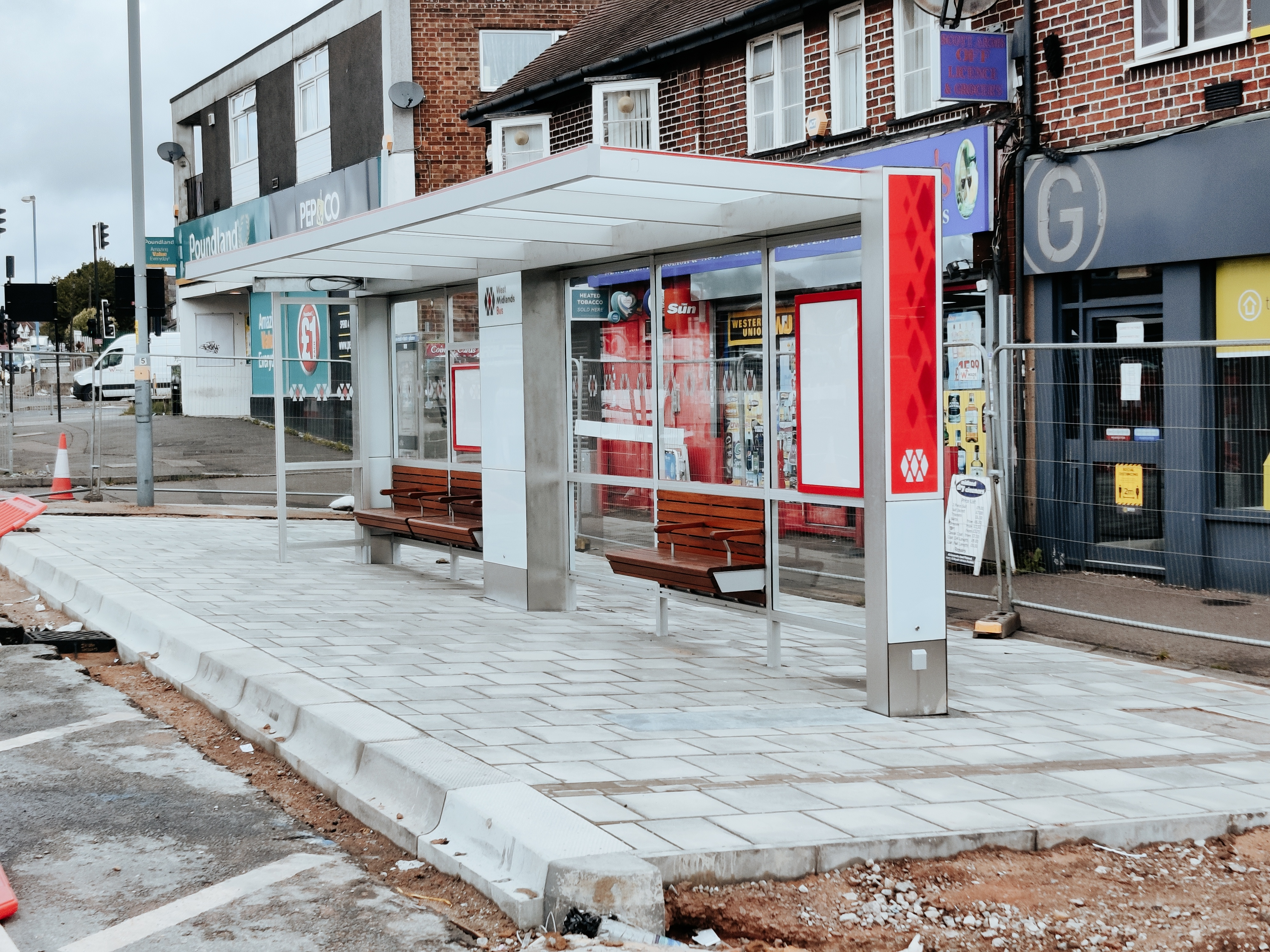
Newly installed 'Sprint' bus shelter, at the Scott Arms, Great Barr, Birmingham seen in August 2021

== Quinton route ==
In July 2014, it was announced that a new BRT bus-tram service "featuring vehicles that look and operate like a tram but without tracks", named Sprint, would be introduced on the Hagley Road, which would connect with the West Midland Metro's Line One extension. Viewed as 'Metro's Little Sister', Sprint is intended to offer a higher level of service quality than standard bus services, and will feature some bus priority measures, like bus lanes and priority signalling to speed up service. Sprint should grow demand, and improve connectivity in areas which do not yet fully justify Metro access. Centro stated that the new City Centre-Quinton route was chosen primarily for its potential for economic growth. The route will have 16 stops.

== Walsall-Birmingham-Solihull route ==
Plans remain for the 'Quinton line', but priority was given, following the award of the 2022 Commonwealth Games to Birmingham, for a cross-city route from Walsall along the A34 road, passing Alexander Stadium in Perry Barr, to Birmingham City Centre and on to Birmingham Airport and Solihull. Work on infrastructure began in April 2021 with the aim to be complete before the Commonwealth Games started in July 2022.

As of March 2026, no Sprint vehicles have been introduced.

== Future routes ==
Future routes are proposed to Stourbridge, Longbridge, Sutton Coldfield and Dudley.

In 2014, money was also allocated for a service to Birmingham Airport "by 2021".
