= West Midlands Metro =

Light rail system in the West Midlands, England

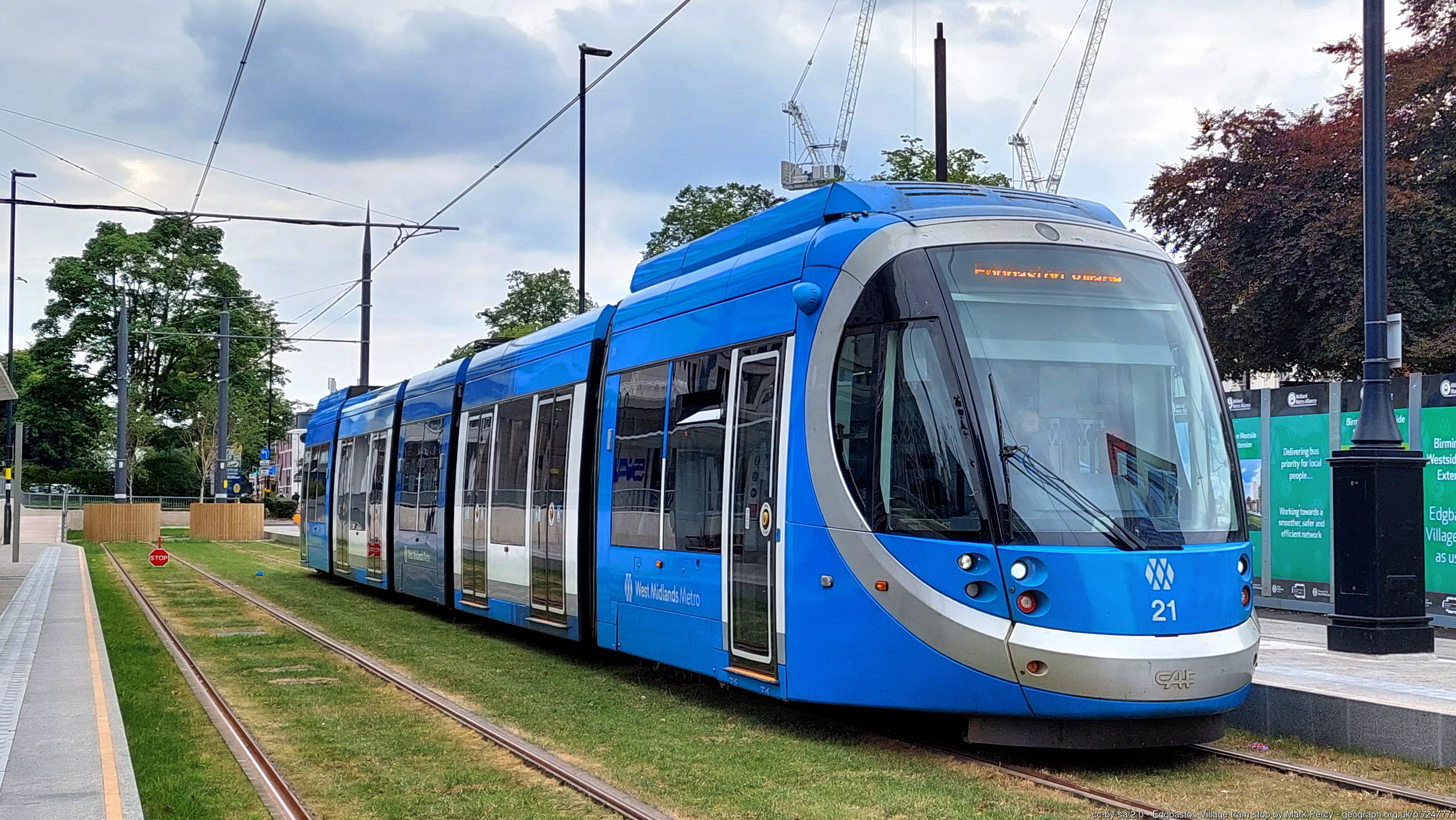
- Urbos 3 tram in West Midlands Metro livery at Edgbaston Village tram stop, pictured in 2022

Overview
- Owner: Transport for West Midlands
- Area served: Birmingham City Centre, Sandwell, Wolverhampton, Dudley
- Locale: West Midlands county
- Transit type: Tram/Light rail
- Number of lines: 2 (partial completion of line 2) (2 under construction)
- Number of stations: 35 (+17 under construction)
- Annual ridership: 9.0 million (2025/26) ▲3%
- Headquarters: Potters Lane, Wednesbury
- Website: westmidlandsmetro.com

Operation
- Began operation: 30 May 1999
- Operator: Midland Metro Limited
- Number of vehicles: 42 Urbos 3

Technical
- System length: 14.9 miles (24.0 km)
- Track gauge: 1,435 mm (4 ft 8 1/2 in) standard gauge
- Electrification: Overhead line (750 V DC)
- Top speed: 70 km/h (43 mph)

The West Midlands Metro is a light-rail/tram system in the county of West Midlands, England. The network has 35 stops with a total of 14.9 miles (24.0 km) of track; it currently consists of a single route, Line 1, which operates between two termini in the city of Birmingham and two in the city of Wolverhampton via the towns of Bilston, Wednesbury and West Bromwich, on a mixture of former railway lines and urban on-street running. A second line is set to open in 2027, operating between Wednesbury and Dudley. The system is owned by the public body Transport for West Midlands, and operated by Midland Metro Limited, a company wholly owned by the West Midlands Combined Authority.

During August 1995, a 25-year contract for the design, construction, operation and maintenance of Line 1 was awarded to the Altram consortium; construction commenced three months later. It was launched on 30 May 1999 as Midland Metro, partly using the disused Birmingham Snow Hill to Wolverhampton Low Level Line. During 2006, Ansaldo and John Laing Group both withdrew from the consortium, thus day-to-day operation of the Metro was taken over by the remaining partner, National Express. In October 2018, the National Express concession ended and the system was taken over by Transport for West Midlands, the transport arm of the West Midlands Combined Authority (WMCA).

The line originally terminated at Birmingham Snow Hill station at the edge of the city centre, but following an extension opened in December 2015 it now serves the central core of Birmingham, including the principal regional mainline station, Birmingham New Street. Following further extensions the line has terminated at Edgbaston Village since 2022, with a second, temporary, terminus at Millennium Point opened in April 2026, on the yet-to-be completed line to Digbeth. At the other end of the line, an extension to Wolverhampton station was opened on 17 September 2023. The Metro was originally operated by a fleet of 16 AnsaldoBreda T-69 trams; these were replaced during the 2010s by a newer fleet of 42 CAF Urbos 3.

Construction of a new branch line from Wednesbury to Brierley Hill was approved in March 2019, started in February 2020 and was intended to be completed for the 2022 Commonwealth Games, but has been severely delayed; it is currently scheduled to be completed at least to Dudley in 2027. An additional branch line running to Birmingham's Eastside via Curzon Street – the region's under-construction High Speed 2 terminus – and terminating at Digbeth is also under construction as of 2026. There are also proposals to expand this branch further towards Chelmsley Wood (Solihull) and out to Birmingham Airport.

== History ==
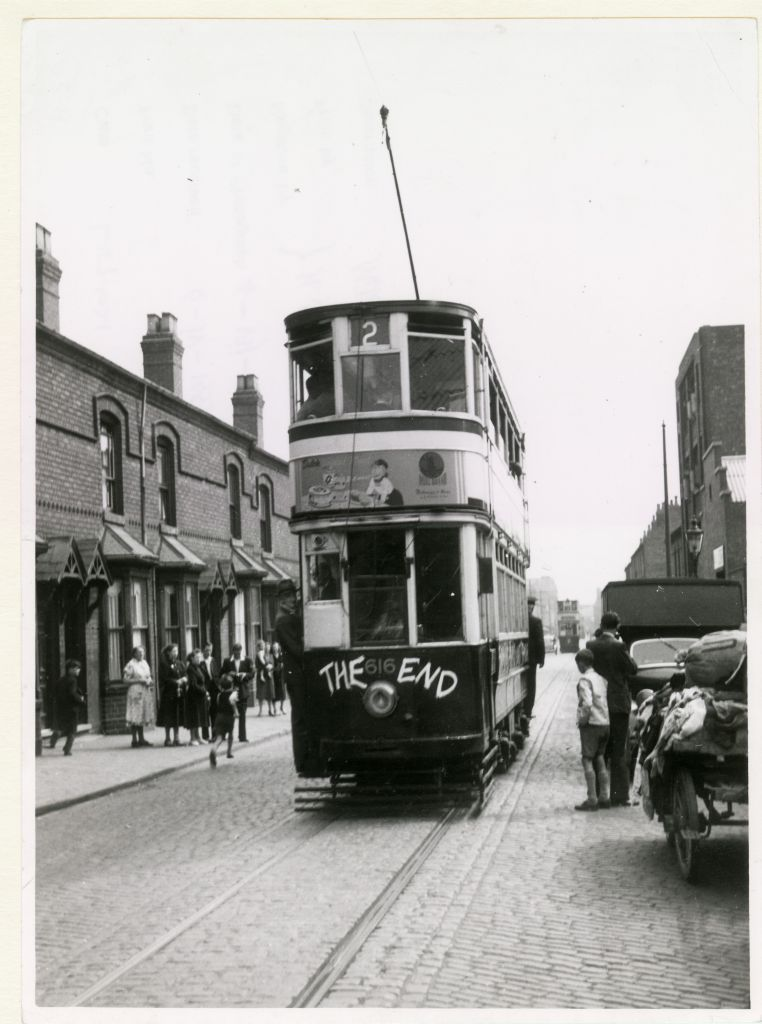
The last tram to run on the 3 ft 6 in (1,067 mm) system, in 1953.

Birmingham once had an extensive 3 ft 6 in (1,067 mm) tram network—eventually using double-deck vehicles—run by Birmingham Corporation Tramways. However, as in most British cities, the network was wound down and closed by the local authority, with the last tram running in 1953.

=== 1984 proposals ===
Proposals for a light-rail or Metro system in Birmingham and the Black Country had been put forward as early as the 1950s and 1960s, paradoxically at a time when some of the region's lines and services were beginning to be cut back. Serious inquiry into the possibility started in 1981, when the West Midlands County Council and the West Midlands Passenger Transport Executive formed a joint planning committee to look at light rail as a means of solving the conurbation's congestion problems. In summer 1984 they produced a report, "Rapid Transit for the West Midlands", which set out ambitious proposals for a £500 million network of ten light-rail routes that would be predominantly street-running, but would include some underground sections in Birmingham city centre. One of the proposed routes would have used part of the existing line as far as West Bromwich.

The scheme suffered from several drawbacks, one being that three of the proposed routes, from Birmingham to Sutton Coldfield, Shirley, and Dorridge, would take over existing railways, and would have included the conversion into a tramway of the Cross-City Line between Aston and Blake Street, ending direct rail services to Lichfield. The northern section of the North Warwickshire Line was also to be converted as far as Shirley station, leaving a question mark over existing train services to Stratford-upon-Avon. Tram tracks would also run alongside the existing line to Solihull and Dorridge, and local train services would have ended.

The most serious drawback, however, which proved fatal to the scheme, was that the first proposed route of the network, between Five Ways and Castle Bromwich via the city centre, would have involved the demolition of 238 properties. This invoked strong opposition from local residents. The scheme was spearheaded by Wednesfield Labour councillor Phil Bateman, but was eventually abandoned in late 1985 in the face of public opposition to demolishing hundreds of houses, and the Transport Executive was unable to find a member of parliament willing to sponsor an enabling Bill.

=== 1988 proposals ===
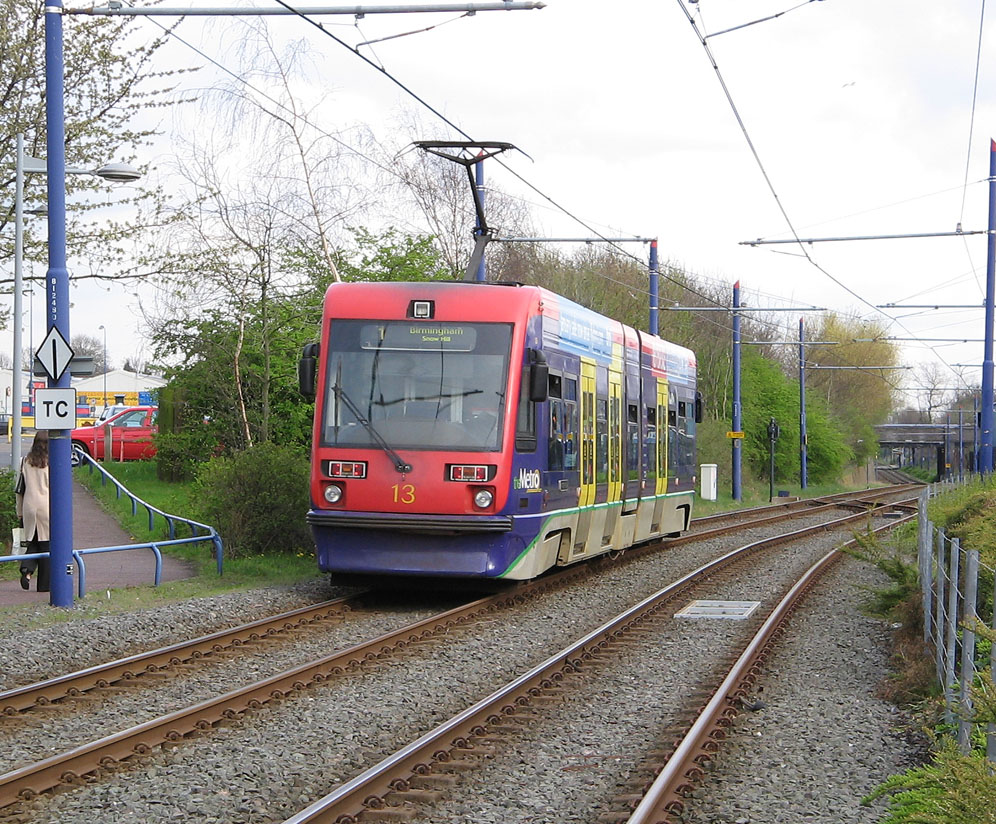
An AnsaldoBreda T-69 tram on the former Birmingham Snow Hill to Wolverhampton Low Level Line

Following the abolition of the West Midlands County Council and establishment of a new Passenger Transport Authority in 1986, a new light-rail scheme under the name "Midland Metro" was revived with a different set of lines. The first of up to 15 lines was intended to be operating by the end of 1993, and a network of 200 kilometres was planned to be in use by 2000.

In February 1988, it was announced that the first route, Line 1, would be between Birmingham and Wolverhampton, using much of the mothballed trackbed of the former Birmingham Snow Hill to Wolverhampton Low Level Line, a route not included in the 1984 recommended network, partly as at that stage the section between Wednesbury and Bilston was still in use, not closing until 1992. The Wednesbury to Birmingham section had closed back in 1972, and the section between Bilston and Wolverhampton was last used in 1983.

A Bill to give West Midlands Passenger Transport Executive powers to build the line was deposited in Parliament in November 1988, and became an Act of Parliament a year later, with completion expected by the mid-1990s.

A three-line network was initially planned, and powers were also obtained to build two further routes. Firstly an extension of Line 1 through the city centre to Five Ways, then a second line, Midland Metro Line 2, running to Chelmsley Wood, and then Birmingham Airport. A third line, Line 3 was also proposed, running from Line 1 at Wolverhampton to Walsall, using much of the disused trackbed of the Wolverhampton and Walsall Railway, and then, using the Wednesbury to Brierley Hill trackbed of the South Staffordshire Line (which would close in 1993), running southwards to Dudley intersecting with Line 1 along the route. This would provide a direct link with the new Merry Hill Shopping Centre, which was built between 1984 and 1989.

=== Construction of Line 1 ===
During August 1995, a 25-year contract for the design, construction, operation and maintenance of Line 1 was awarded to the Altram consortium; construction commenced three months later. The estimated construction cost in 1995 was £145 million (equivalent to £298,110,000 in 2025) of which loans and grants from central government accounted for £80M, the European Regional Development Fund contributed £31M, while the West Midlands Passenger Transport Authority provided £17.1M and Altram contributed £11.4M.

By May 1997, construction work was reportedly 50 per cent complete and track-laying had been progressing at 0.5 kilometres (0.31 mi) per week. However, the targeted completion date of August 1998 was missed by ten months, leading to compensation being paid by Altram. The original part of Line 1, Birmingham to Wolverhampton, was opened on 30 May 1999.

=== Eastside extension ===
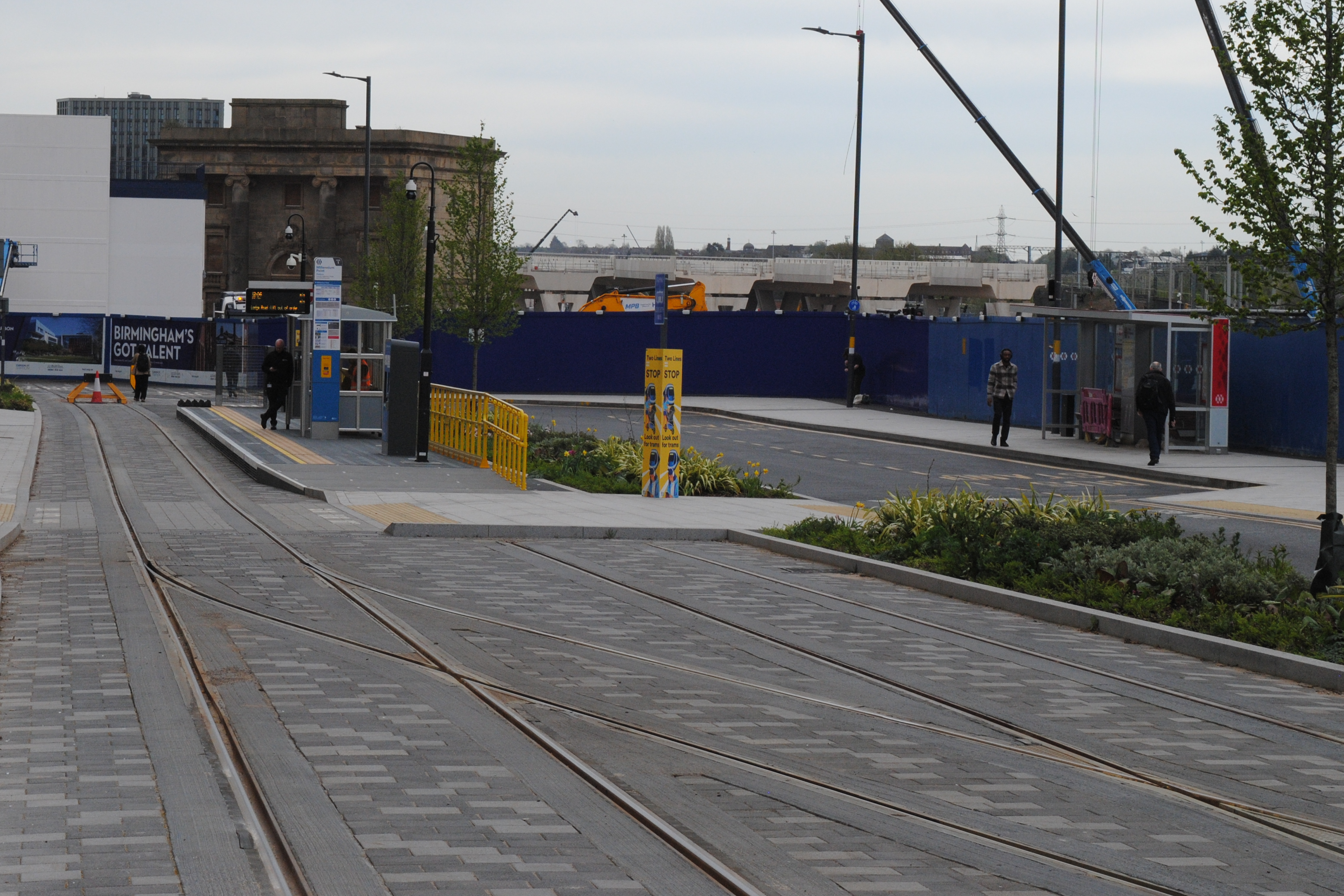
The Millennium point terminus on 9 April 2026. Note the absence of overhead wiring.

On the 5 April 2026, an extension to Millennium point was opened with the new stations being Albert Street and Millennium Point. Between those two stops, trams run on battery power, as the overhead wiring ends at Albert Street.

=== Further development ===
More than 25 years after the system opened, Line 2 and Line 3 have not been built. In 1997, Centro accepted that they were unable to get funding for the proposed lines, and therefore adopted a strategy of expanding the system in "bite-sized chunks", with the city-centre extension of Line 1 as the first priority. The intention was that the first decade of the 21st century would see the completion of the first of these projects.

Work on the Birmingham Metro tram extension began in June 2012, launched by transport minister Norman Baker. The dig was begun at the junction of Corporation Street and Bull Street, with work to move water pipes and power cables. On 6 December 2015, trams entered service on the extension to Bull Street. The remainder of Line 1 was opened in stages, with completion through to Edgbaston Village in July 2022. The section of line between the Library and Edgbaston is unwired, with trams taking power from onboard batteries.

== Current network ==
=== Route ===
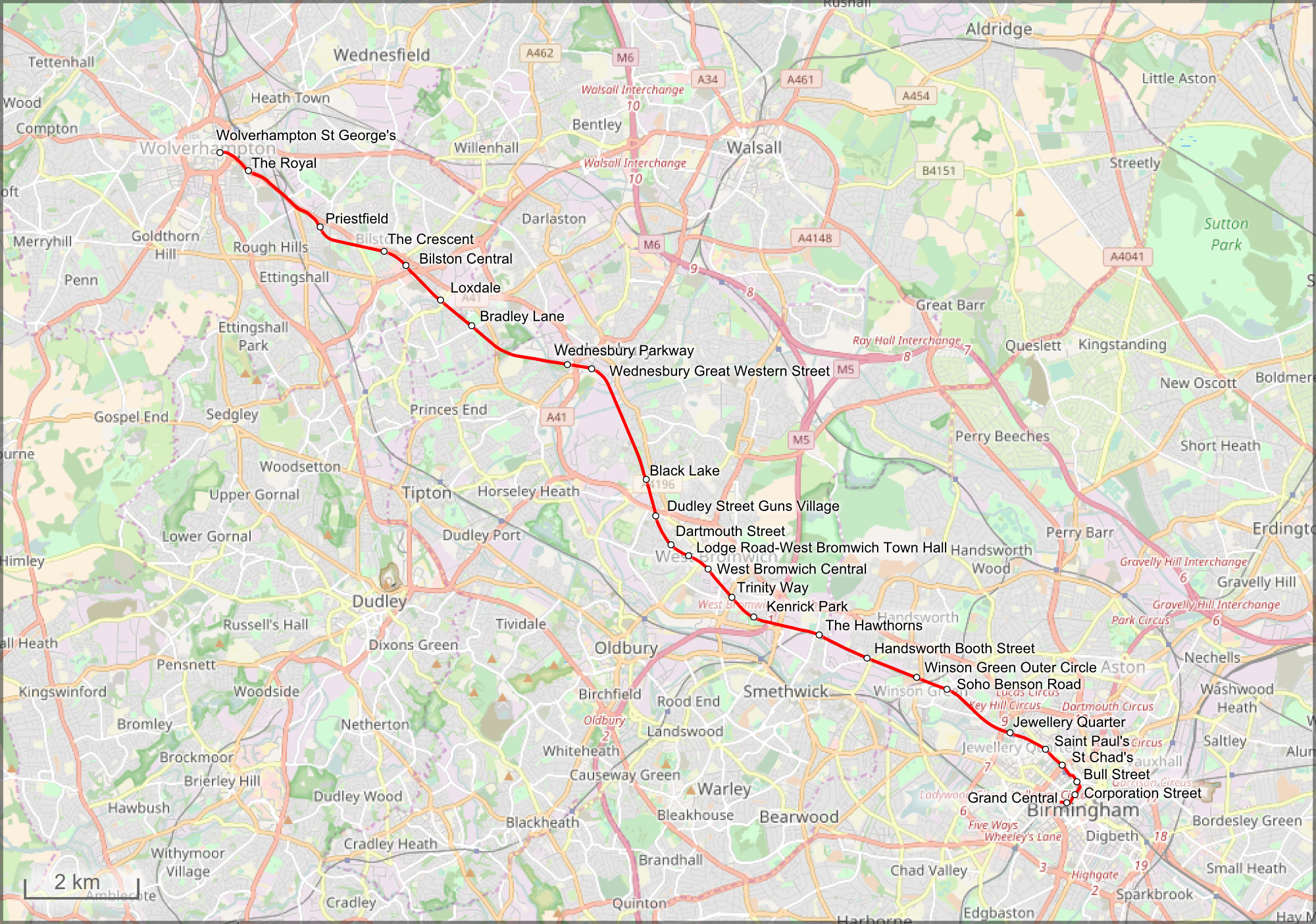
The route of Line 1 and the Birmingham City Centre extension

For nearly two decades, Line 1 between Birmingham to Wolverhampton was the solitary operating section of the Midland Metro. It runs mostly along the trackbed of the former Great Western Railway line between the two cities which was closed in phases between 1972 and 1992. The line originally terminated at Birmingham Snow Hill station, using one of the former rail platforms. Between 2015 and 2016 the line was extended across Birmingham city centre as far as Grand Central. From December 2019, trams terminated at Library tram stop next to the Library of Birmingham, and in July 2022 the line was further extended to Edgbaston Village.

From Grand Central, which allows interchange with the National Rail network at Birmingham New Street station, West Midlands Metro then runs on streets through the city centre to Birmingham Snow Hill station. From there, the line runs north-west, and for the first few miles it runs alongside the Birmingham to Worcester railway line, before the two diverge. Two stations on this stretch (Jewellery Quarter and The Hawthorns) are also tram/railway interchange stations.

At the northern end of the route trams leave the railway trackbed at Priestfield to run along Bilston Road to Wolverhampton St George's. Between September 2023 and September 2025, trams terminated solely at Wolverhampton station. As of 29th September 2025, trams now alternate between Wolverhampton St. George's and Wolverhampton Station.

The original proposal was to run into the former Wolverhampton Low Level railway station but this was abandoned as the terminus would be too remote from the city centre. A loop around the city centre was also planned but this has not been implemented.

=== Stops ===
There are 35 tram stops in use on the route, with only the former terminus at Birmingham Snow Hill no longer in use.

=== Frequencies ===
Services run on two routes:

- Between Wolverhampton Station and Edgbaston (direct)
- Between Wolverhampton St George's and Edgbaston (via a reversal at Millennium Point in the Edgbaston direction, direct in the Wolverhampton direction)

Each route runs every 15 minutes during the day (Monday-Saturday), every 20 minutes on Sundays, and every 30 minutes during late evenings. Both routes combine to provide most of the network with a higher frequency service. Trams take roughly 55 minutes to complete the direct route and 65 on the route via Millennium Point.

== Rolling stock ==
=== Current fleet ===
West Midlands Metro operates 42 trams, with more on option. In summary:

Class	Image	Type	Top speed		Length metres	Capacity			In service	Orders	Fleet numbers	Routes operated	Built	Years operated
Class	Image	Type	mph	km/h	Length metres	Std	Sdg	Total	In service	Orders	Fleet numbers	Routes operated	Built	Years operated
CAF Urbos 3		Tram	43	71	33	54	156	210	21	—	17–37	All	2012–2015	2014–present
CAF Urbos 3		Tram	43	71	33	54	156	210	21	—	38-58	All	2021–2023	2021–Present
Total									42					

In February 2012, Centro announced that it was planning a £44.2 million replacement of the entire existing T-69 tram fleet. CAF was named preferred bidder for 19 to 25 Urbos 3 trams. A£40 million order for 20 was signed, with options for five more. The new fleet provided an increased service of ten trams per hour in each direction, with an increased capacity of 210 passengers per tram (compared to 156 passengers on the T69 trams).

The first four new trams entered service on 5 September 2014; all of the T-69s had been replaced by August 2015.

In October 2019, WMCA awarded CAF a contract to supply an additional 21 Urbos 3 trams worth £83.5 million for the expanding network, with the option to purchase a further 29. The contract includes technical support and battery management services over 30 years.

Cracks were found in a couple of the new trams during routine inspection in June 2021 leading to all services being briefly suspended. Services were suspended again in November 2021 for four weeks as further inspections had discovered that more significant permanent repairs were required.

The service was suspended again on 20 March 2022 for replacement of body panels and recommenced on 9 June 2022.

=== Former fleet ===
West Midlands Metro has previously operated the following trams:

Class	Image	Type	Top speed		Length metres	Capacity			Number	Fleet numbers	Routes operated	Built	Years operated
Class	Image	Type	mph	km/h	Length metres	Std	Sdg	Total	Number	Fleet numbers	Routes operated	Built	Years operated
AnsaldoBreda T-69		Tram	43.5	70	24.36	56	100	156	16	01–16	Line 1	1996–1999	1999–2015

==== T-69 ====
The T-69s were built in Italy by AnsaldoBreda (now Hitachi Rail Italy), and were used only on the Midland Metro (as it was called then). After withdrawal, all 16 were transferred to the tram test centre at Long Marston.

== Infrastructure ==
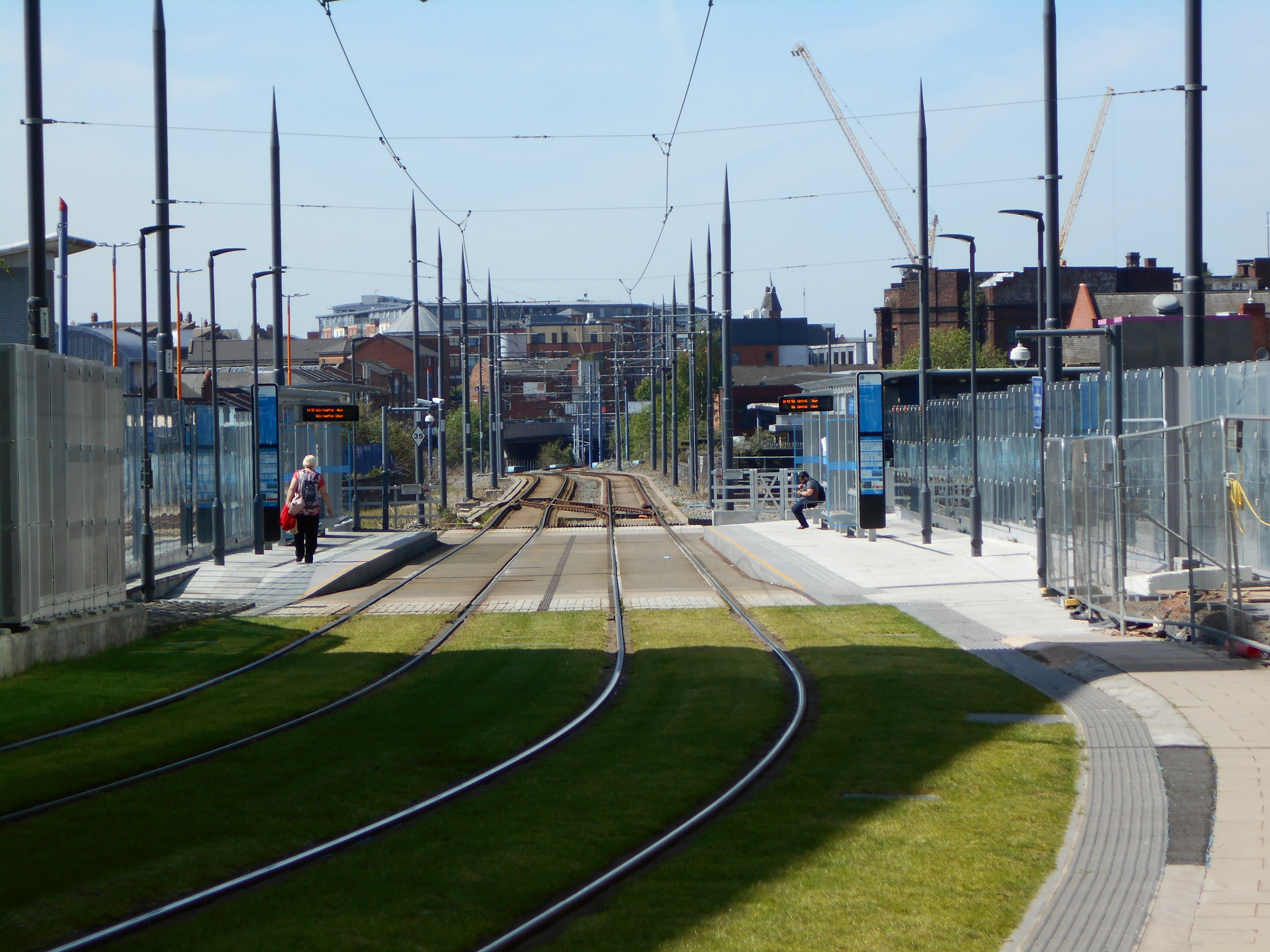
The transition from segregated track to street running near St Chads tram stop

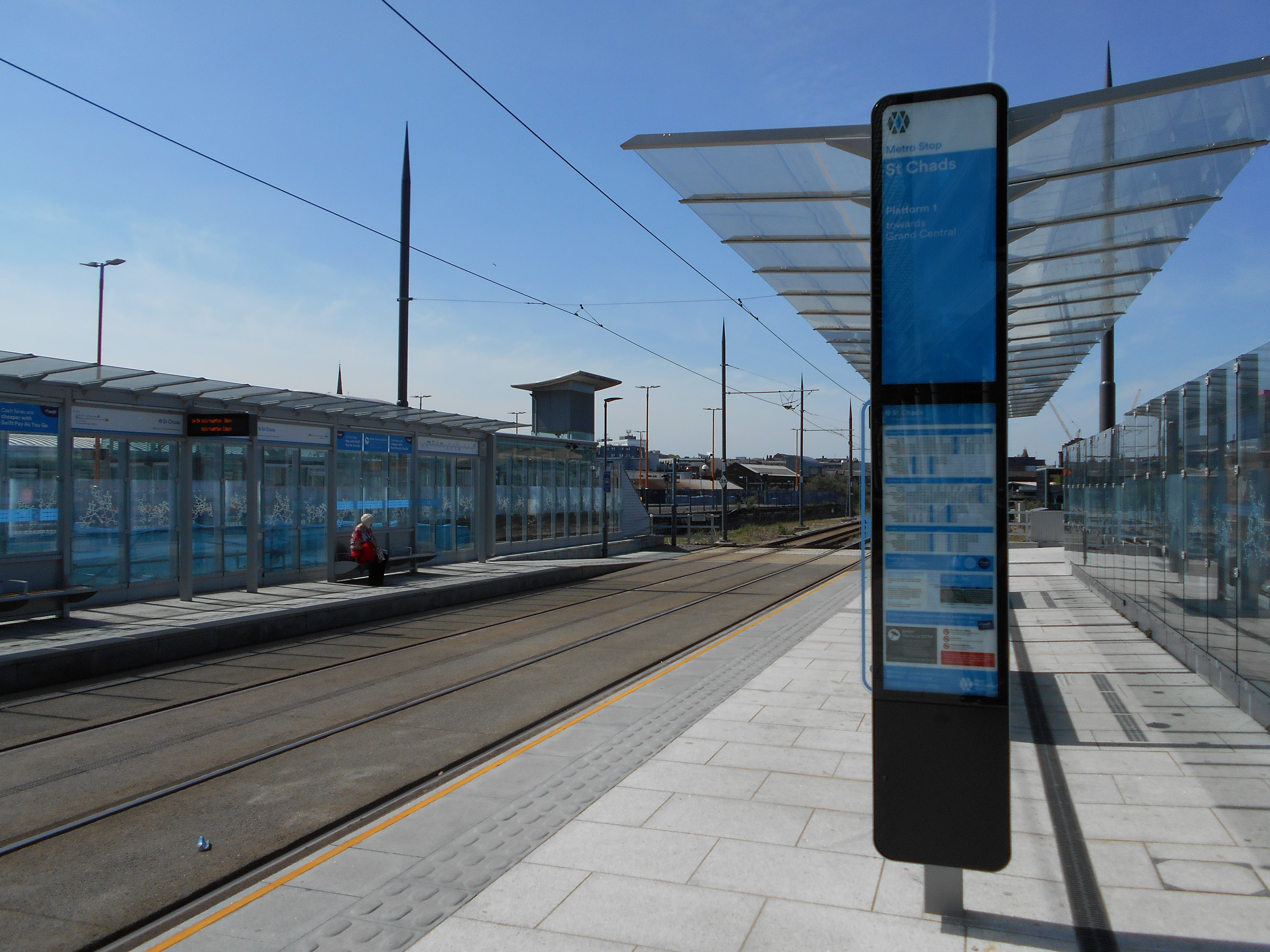
St Chads tram stop

=== Track ===
The West Midlands Metro is a standard-gauge double-track tramway. Trams are driven manually under a mix of line-of-sight and signals. Turnback crossovers along the line, including in the street section, have point indicators.

On the trackbed section Birmingham to Priestfield, signals are at Black Lake level crossing, Wednesbury Parkway, and Metro Centre. The street section has signals at every set of traffic lights, tied into the road signals to allow tram priority.

=== Tram stop design ===
The tram stops are unstaffed raised platforms with open-fronted cantilever shelters equipped with seats, a 'live' digital display of services, closed-circuit television, and an intercom linked to Metro Centre.

=== Power supply ===
Most of the line is electrified at 750 V DC using overhead lines, and that system was renewed in 2010/11, requiring short-term closures. The current trams have batteries, and charge at specially adapted tram stops, eliminating the need for visible power infrastructure within certain city sections.

=== Depot ===
The Metro Centre control room, stabling point and depot is near Wednesbury Great Western Street tram stop, on land once used as railway sidings.

In January 2023, construction began to expand the depot.

== Fares and ticketing ==
West Midlands Metro has now re-instated ticket machines at all tram stops, on tram conductors also sell tickets and now the system has proprietary ticketing app with all types of fares available. Up until 2018 single, return, and day tickets could only be purchased with cash or Swift cards, but Contactless payment cards are now accepted.

As well as the above, West Midlands Metro accepts a range of interavailable Transport for West Midlands (TfWM) tickets such as nbus+Metro and nNetwork, which can be bought on buses and at railway stations, as well as on the trams.

Cash fares were distance-related. The scale was originally intended to be broadly comparable with buses, but this caused the system to run at a significant loss and fares rose. In January 2013, the adult single fare from Birmingham to Wolverhampton was £2 by bus and £3.60 by tram, although the tram journey is much quicker even when the bus routes are congestion-free. By 2016 the tram fare had risen to £4. In November 2013, Birmingham City Council indicated plans to introduce a smart-card system (similar to Transport for London's Oyster card) to improve access, alongside a range of measures including a new Tube-style map and electric bus networks. This has now launched and is called the Swift card.

In March 2022, the fare system was amended again, with the graduated fares replaced by four zones:

- Zone 1 – Edgbaston Village to Jewellery Quarter (Birmingham City Centre)
- Zone 2 – Jewellery Quarter to Black Lake
- Zone 3 – Black Lake to Priestfield
- Zone 4 – Priestfield to Wolverhampton station (Wolverhampton City Centre)

Fares are now charged on a per-zone basis, with fares payable for travel in Zone 1 slightly higher than Zones 2-4 (this applies to single zone, two zone and three zone fares). The stops at Jewellery Quarter, Black Lake and Priestfield are "boundary stations", meaning they sit in both zones.

In August 2026, West Midlands Metro announced that they would begin introducing Buy Before You Board ticketing in the early autumn, and that the penalty fare would be £100.

== Corporate affairs ==
=== Operator ===
When the Midland Metro system opened in 1999, it was originally operated by Altram, a joint venture of the infrastructure company John Laing, the engineering firm Ansaldo, and the transport group National Express. During 2006, Ansaldo and Laing officially withdrew from the venture after financial difficulties, and day-to-day operation was taken over by the remaining partner, National Express, who ran the system as National Express Midland Metro.

In October 2018, the National Express concession ended and the system was taken over by Transport for West Midlands, the transport arm of the West Midlands Combined Authority (WMCA). Operation of Midland Metro was taken over by Midland Metro Ltd, a company wholly owned by WMCA, and the system was rebranded West Midlands Metro. WMCA subsequently set up a consortium of various engineering and consultancy firms, the Midland Metro Alliance, to design and construct future network extensions.

=== Business trends ===
The current operator, Midland Metro, has produced accounts from 1 October 2017. Between 1999 and 2003, Altram had operated Midland Metro unsuccessfully on a for-profit basis. However, operating revenue did not cover costs, and in February 2003, auditors refused to sign off Midland Metro's accounts as a going concern. From 2006, under sole National Express control, losses were largely covered by cross-subsidy from other parts of the National Express group, but the figures were not shown separately in their published accounts.

Passenger revenue and passenger numbers are published by the Department for Transport.

The key available trends in recent years for West Midlands Metro are (years ending 31 March):

	2010	2011	2012	2013	2014	2015	2016	2017	2018	2019	2020	2021	2022	2023	2024	2025
Turnover (Note: From Midland Metro Ltd's Statement of Accounts) (£M)										8.3	12.8	7.6	10.3	10	14.7	18.9
Operating profit (Note: From Midland Metro Ltd's Statement of Accounts) (£M)										−0.002	0.013	0.037	0.041	0.054	0.054	−0.065
Profit for the financial year (Note: From Midland Metro Ltd's Statement of Accounts) (£M)										-	−0.002	−0.014	−0.013	−0.016	−0.012	−0.014
Passenger revenue (Note: As defined in the DfT Light Rail and Tram Survey (Table LRT0301a)) (£M)	6.5	7.0	7.4	7.8	7.9	7.7	8.6	10.3	9.8	10.7	11.3	5.8	10	8.9	13	14
Number of employees (Note: From Midland Metro Ltd's Statement of Accounts) (average)										181	219	218				
Number of passengers (Note: Passenger journeys, as defined in the DfT Light Rail and Tram Survey (Table LRT0101)) (M)	4.7	4.8	4.9	4.8	4.7	4.4	4.8	6.2	5.7	8.3	8.0	3.4	4.7	5.4	8.3	8.8
Number of trams (at year end)	16	16	16	16	16	16	21	21	21	21	21	21				
Notes/sources										(Note: 2019: Figures for 18 months)		(Note: 2021: Activities and income in fiscal 2021 were severely reduced by the impact of the coronavirus pandemic)				

=== Passenger numbers ===
Detailed passenger journeys since the system commenced operations on 30 May 1999 were:

Estimated passenger journeys (millions) made on West Midlands Metro by financial year (to 31 March)
Year	Passenger journeys	Year	Passenger journeys	Year	Passenger journeys	Year	Passenger journeys
1999–00	4.8	2007–08	4.8	2015–16	4.8	2023–24	8.3
2000–01	5.4	2008–09	4.7	2016–17	6.2	2024–25	8.8
2001–02	4.8	2009–10	4.7	2017–18	5.7	2025–26	9.0
2002–03	4.9	2010–11	4.8	2018–19	8.3		
2003–04	5.1	2011–12	4.9	2019–20	8.0		
2004–05	5.0	2012–13	4.8	2020–21	3.4		
2005–06	5.1	2013–14	4.7	2021–22	4.7		
2006–07	4.9	2014–15	4.4	2022–23	5.4		
Estimates from the Department for Transport

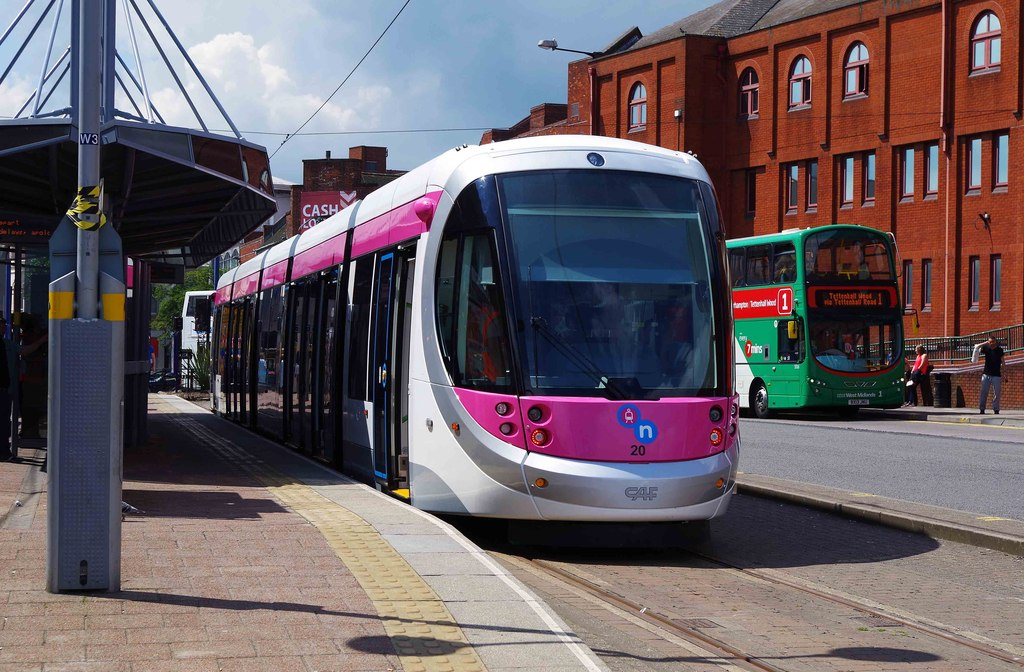
An Urbos 3 tram on display at Wolverhampton St George's in June 2014, in the old pink livery

The shared West Midlands branding, here blue for metro

Usage on the initial line averaged about five million passenger journeys annually, but numbers remained static for many years. This was not seen as successful, as 14 to 20 million passengers per year had been projected.

Numerous reasons were suggested for the underperformance, including: that the line has lacked visibility, being confined to Snow Hill station at the edge of Birmingham city centre; that there are quicker trains running between Birmingham and Wolverhampton; that the line did not serve New Street station or any of Birmingham's major visitor attractions (except for the Jewellery Quarter, already well-served by suburban trains). Nonetheless, overcrowding sometimes occurred on trams at peak hours.

Passenger numbers increased sharply following the opening of the extension into Birmingham city centre in June 2016, with figures for 2016/17 exceeding six million for the first time, and figures for 2019/20 exceeding eight million.

=== Branding and livery ===
The original Midland Metro branding consisted of a blue, green and red livery on tram vehicles with yellow doors. Upon the change to National Express operation in 2006, Midland Metro was rebranded with Network West Midlands livery, then a sub-brand of the transport authority Centro, and trams were painted in a magenta and silver livery with blue doors.

Since 2017, West Midlands Metro has adopted shared branding with other transport modes consisting of a common hexagonal logo formed from the letters WM. This common brand has been introduced in order to create a common identity for an integrated transport system for the region. Each mode bears a coloured variant of the logo: blue for trams, red for buses, orange for trains, magenta for roads, purple for taxis and green for cycling and walking initiatives. The primary typeface is LL Circular by Lineto.

From 24 June 2018, the system became known as "West Midlands Metro".

== Expansion ==
The Midland Metro Alliance was set up in 2017 by WMCA as a long-term framework agreement with transport contractors Colas Rail, Barhale, Thomas Vale, Auctus Management Group, Egis Rail, Tony Gee and Pell Frischman to design and construct future extensions of the West Midlands Metro system.

=== Completed ===
Continuing on from the original route (Line 1), three extensions in four phases have since been opened:

- The Birmingham City Centre extension was completed in 2015 and opened in 2016, roughly coinciding with the opening of a renovated Birmingham New Street station. This moved the Birmingham terminus (and primary interchange) from Snow Hill to New Street, located on Stephenson Street and called Grand Central.
- The Birmingham Westside extension was constructed in two phases. Phase 1, which extended the line from New Street to Birmingham Library, opened in 2019. Phase 2, which extended the line from the Library to Edgbaston Village near Five Ways, opened in 2022.
- The Wolverhampton city centre extension was completed in September 2023, and opened to passengers in the same month. The line allowed direct interchange to Wolverhampton bus station via Pipers Row tram stop and direct interchange to Wolverhampton station via Wolverhampton Station tram stop. After the opening of the extension, Wolverhampton St George's tram stop was abandoned without trams for two years until a weekday daytime service was reinstated.

=== Partially complete ===
- The Birmingham Eastside extension branch line, diverging between Bull Street and Corporation Street tram stops, opened to a temporary terminus at Millennium Point in April 2026. It will terminate there until track can be laid on the site of HS2's Curzon Street station. Work on the extension has been completed on the other side of the site, continuing to Digbeth, serving Digbeth Coach Station.

=== Under construction ===
- The Brierley Hill Line is currently under construction. This line will travel from the current Wednesbury Great Western Street tram stop towards Dudley Port station, Dudley town centre, Merry Hill Shopping Centre, and Brierley Hill. The project is being constructed in two phases, with phase one to Dudley Town Centre almost complete and set to open to passengers in late 2026. The second phase to Merry Hill and Brierley Hill began construction in early 2025, and is expected to open in 2028. Once completed, two new lines will be added to the network, line 2 from Brierley Hill to Birmingham City Centre to Edgbaston Village or Digbeth, and line 3 from Brierley Hill to Wolverhampton St Georges.
West Midlands Metro extensions

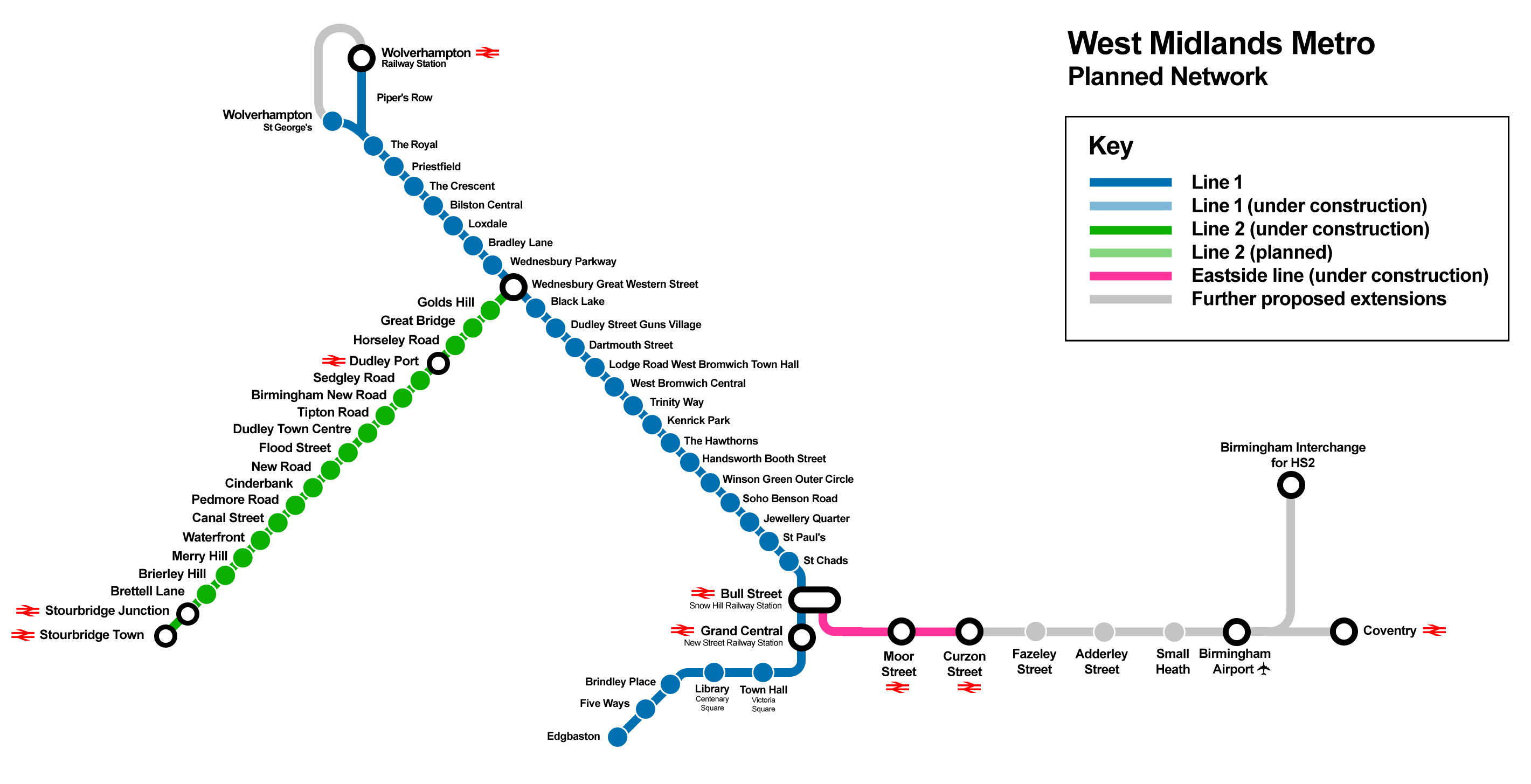
Schematic map showing planned and proposed extensions

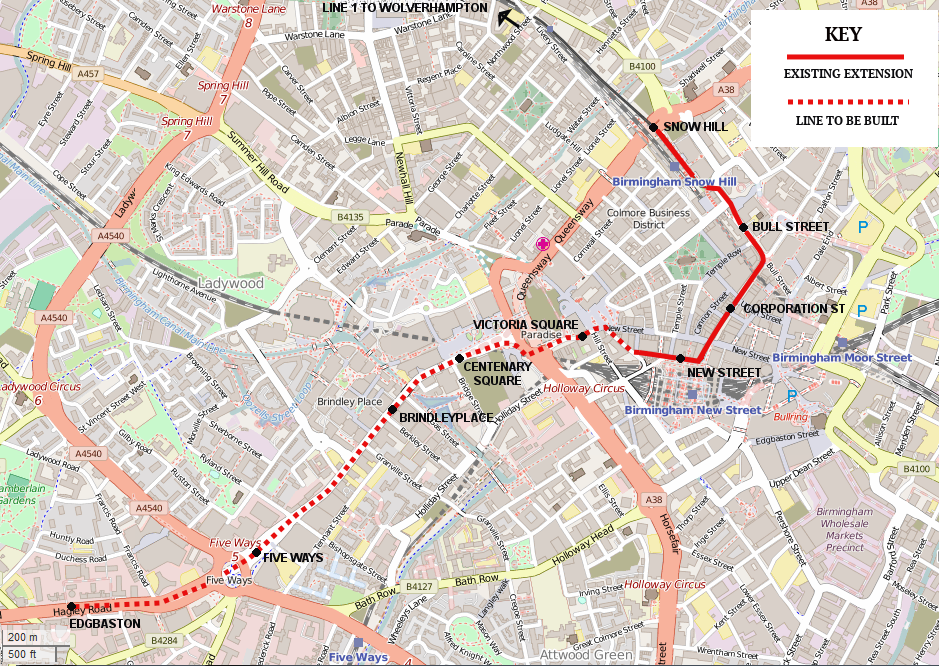
Birmingham Westside extension works

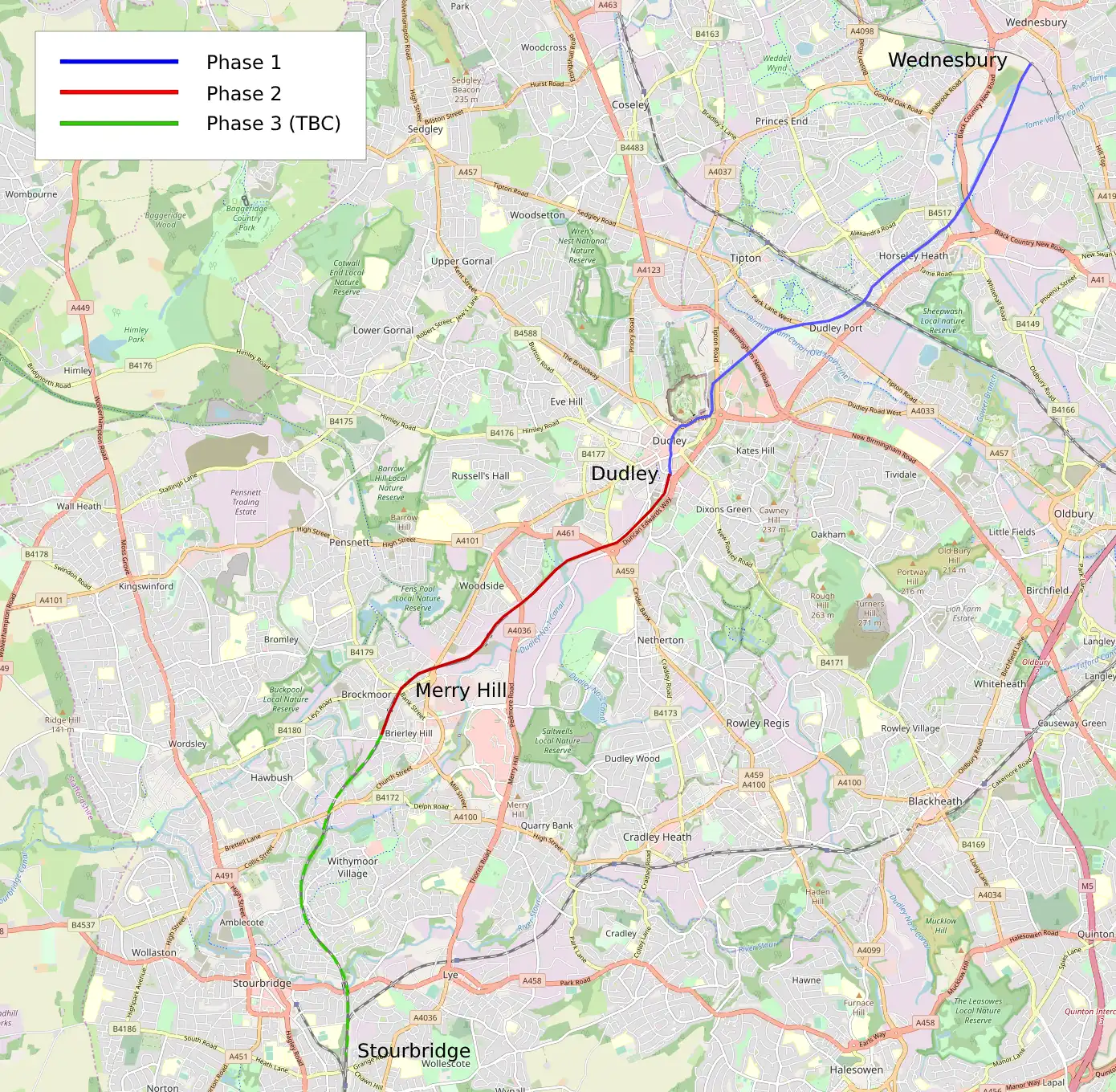
Wednesbury to Brierley Hill extension works (incl. future Stourbridge link)

=== Birmingham extensions ===
==== Birmingham City Centre extension ====
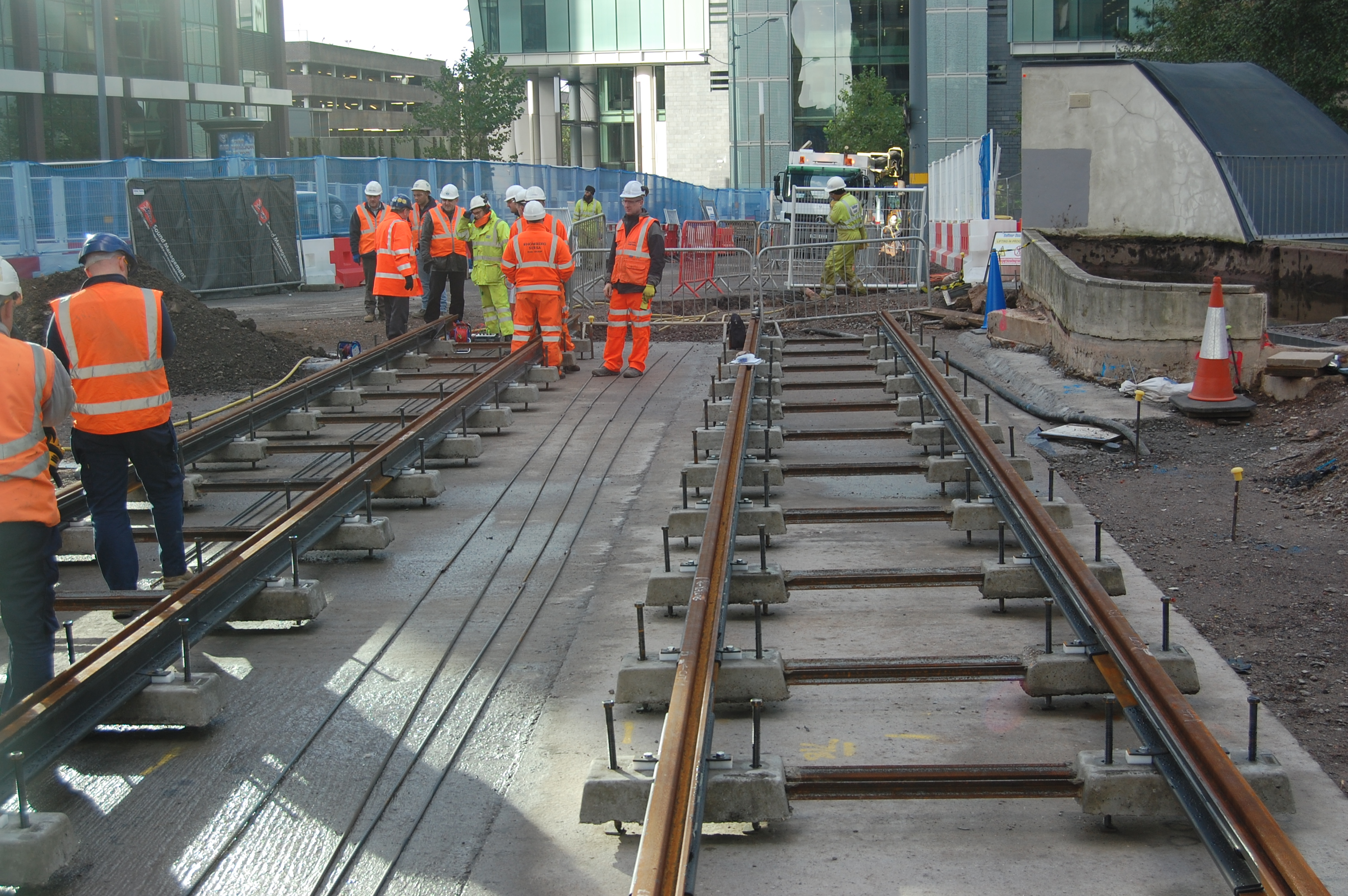
The first tracks of the Birmingham City Centre extension being laid on upper Bull Street).

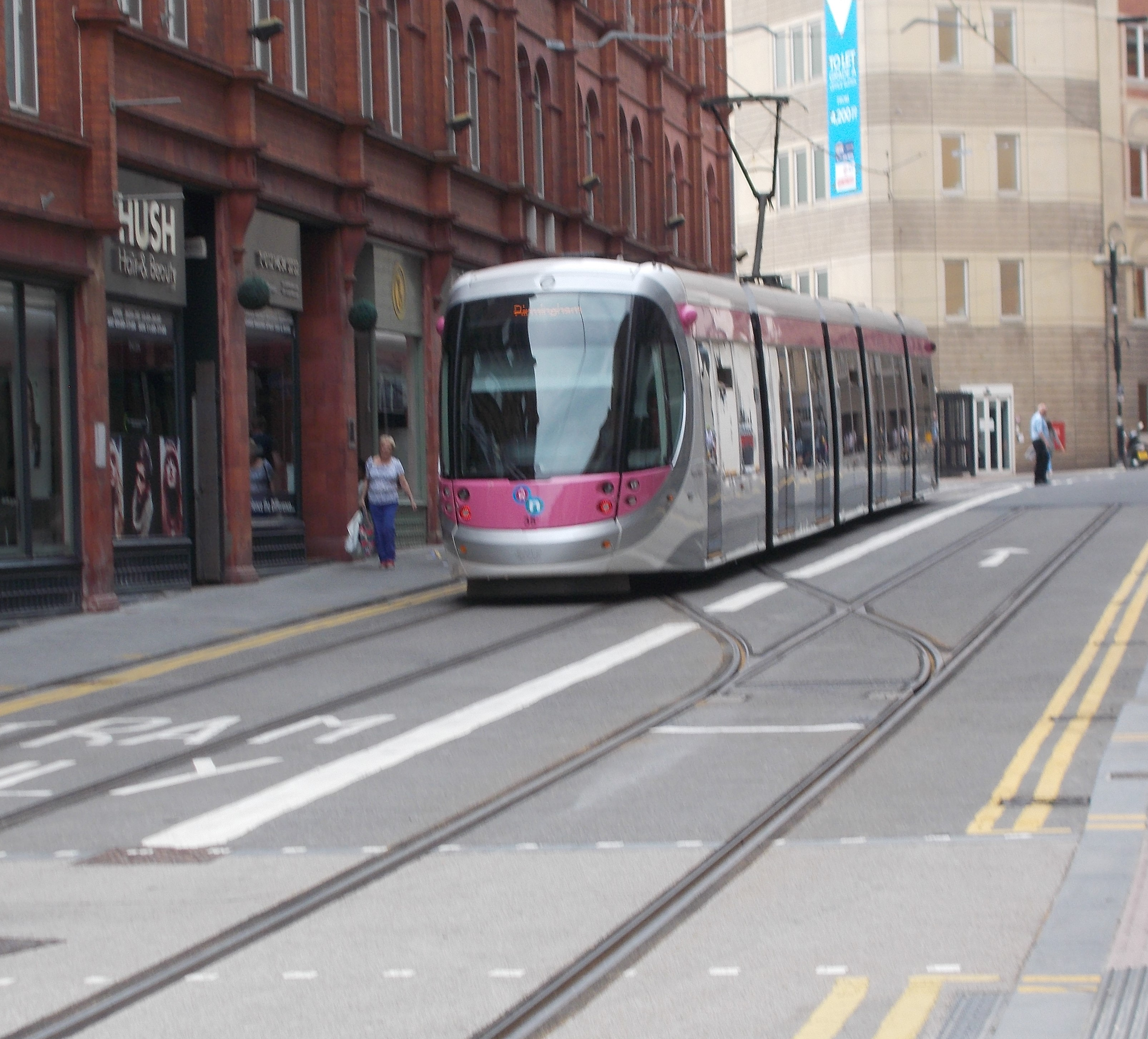
A tram stands on the reversing spur on Stephenson Street in 2016. The Westside extension to Edgbaston Village now continues beyond this.

Until 2015, the southern end of the Metro line terminated at Snow Hill station, on the periphery of Birmingham city centre. From its inception, Midland Metro had failed to attain projected passenger numbers and to operate at a profit, and this was attributed to the fact that the line could not carry passengers all the way into the urban centre. The Birmingham City Centre Extension (BCCE) was conceived to solve this problem by extending the route into the streets of central Birmingham.

This extension serves to facilitate the expansion of the metro network through Birmingham's Eastside and Westside. Originally it was planned to terminate the extension at Stephenson Street, adjacent to New Street railway station, but the plans were revised to continue the extension to Birmingham Library, and eventually as far as Five Ways. A Transport and Works Order authorising the BCCE was made in July 2005, and Government approval was given in February 2012. A new fleet of trams and a new depot at Wednesbury were also authorised, with a budget of £128 million, of which £75 million was to be funded by the Department for Transport (DfT). Extension works began in June 2012. The first phase of the extension, to Bull Street, was completed in December 2015; it was the first time in 62 years that trams were serving passengers on the streets of central Birmingham.

The extension from St Chads to Grand Central was completed in 2016. This extension used a new route to the east of Snow Hill station which diverged from the original line along a new viaduct and descended to street level. The former tram terminus inside Snow Hill station was closed, releasing a fourth platform at Snow Hill to be reinstated for mainline railway use although as of June 2021, little work has been carried out at the former terminus. Interchange between National Rail services and trams is now provided at Bull Street, approximately 320 metres (1,050 ft) from Snow Hill station. From Snow Hill a new tramway was built along Colmore Circus, Upper Bull Street, Corporation Street, and Stephenson Place, terminating at Grand Central. This opened on 30 May 2016. A temporary reversing spur was built in Stephenson Street to allow trams to turn back for the return journey to Wolverhampton. On 19 November 2015, The Queen visited Birmingham and named one of the new trams. Despite only being in use for five years, this track and the concrete trackbed was removed and replaced in May 2021.

==== Birmingham Westside extension ====
The extension from Grand Central to Library began on 5 September 2017. and was opened to passenger service in December 2019. Trams now run from Stephenson Street along Pinfold Street, through Victoria Square with a new stop at Town Hall, along Paradise Street and Broad Street, and terminated at Library in Centenary Square until 16 July 2022.

The Birmingham Westside extension continues the line from Birmingham Library along Broad Street to Hagley Road in Edgbaston (just west of Five Ways). Additional local enterprise partnership funding was made available in 2014 for the extension from Five Ways to Edgbaston. The extension opened in July 2022 with new tram stops at Brindleyplace, Five Ways, and Edgbaston.

==== Birmingham Eastside extension ====
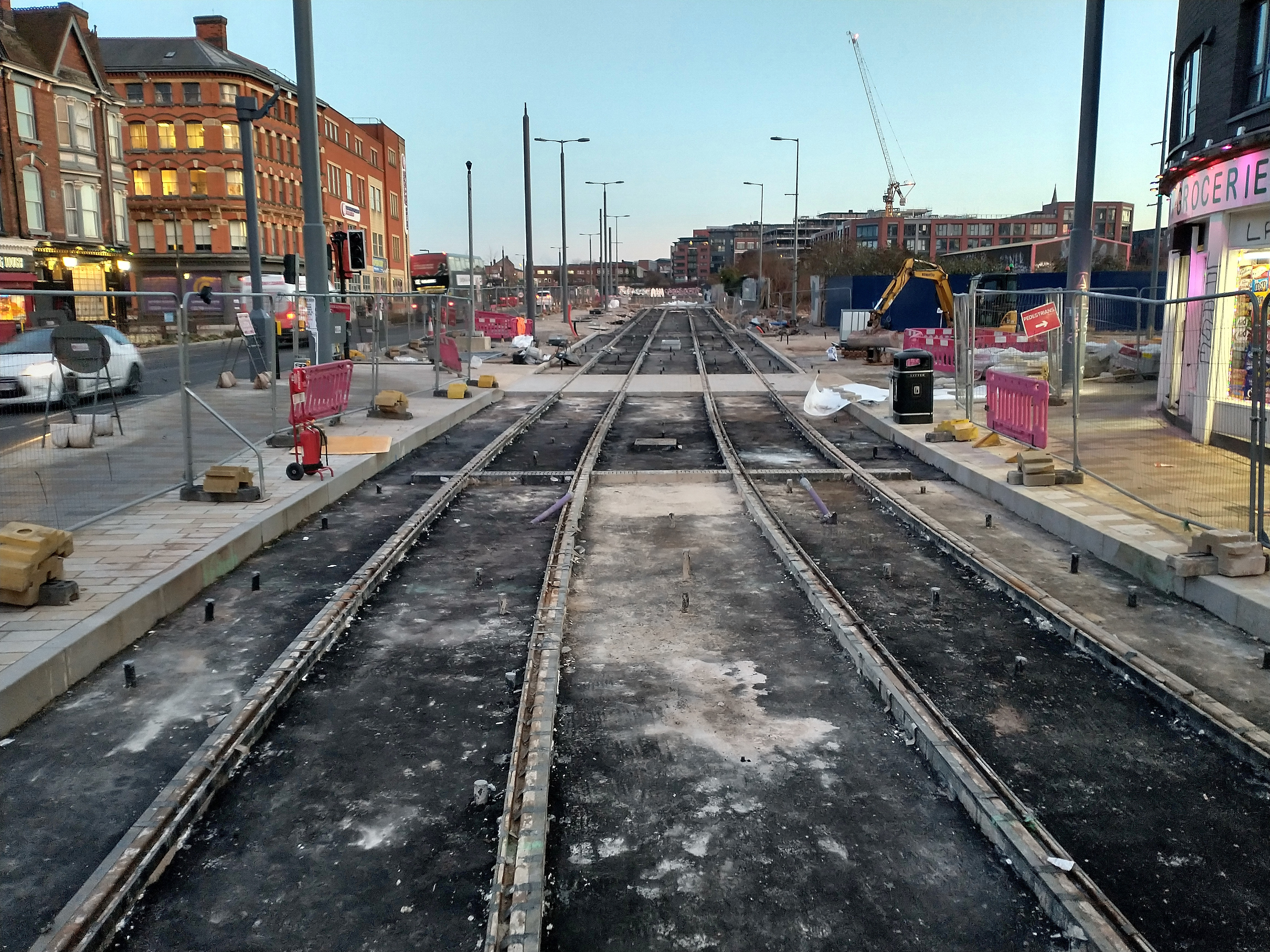
Birmingham Eastside Metro Extension under construction in 2024 near Birmingham Coach Station

In November 2013, Centro announced a proposal for a tram or bus rapid transit route from Birmingham city centre to Coventry, with a loop connecting the Birmingham Airport with Birmingham city centre via Small Heath and Lea Hall, and a line to Coventry, however Coventry may be connected to the Metro by a line of the Coventry Very Light Rail, which is planned to terminate at Birmingham Interchange HS2. The metro line would also serve the planned High Speed 2 interchange at Birmingham Curzon Street. In February 2014, it was announced that funding had been secured for the first phase of the Line 2 Eastside extension as far as Curzon Street, before a terminus at Adderley Street.

The new route branches off from the existing route at a junction at meeting point of Bull St and Corporation St., just south of the Bull Street stop. In 2014, Centro considered two proposed routes, one running via Bull Street and Carrs Lane and serving Moor Street station, and a more direct route via Bull Street and Albert Street, bypassing Moor Street.

A Transport and Works Act application was submitted by the Metro Alliance for the first phase of the Eastside extension, following the route via Albert Street and Curzon Street and terminating at Digbeth.

Construction of the first part of the Eastside extension, including a new tramway junction at Lower Bull St and Corporation St, began in June 2021. The first phase of the works involved utility upgrades and diversions in the area. The closure of Lower Bull Street was expected to be in place until Spring 2022, but the street eventually reopened in July 2023. Construction is complete between Bull Street and Millennium Point and the extension opened up to this point on 5 April 2026. The rest of the extension has been built between Meriden Street and High Street Deritend in Digbeth, with the two halves planned to connect once Transport for West Midlands and the Metro Alliance are given access to the Curzon Street HS2 site.

==== East Birmingham to Solihull extension ====
The East Birmingham to Solihull extension (EBSE) was originally investigated in 2004 as a 14 km (8.7 miles) route to Birmingham Airport and National Exhibition Centre, serving suburbs along the A45. Journey time from central Birmingham (Bull Street) to the airport was estimated at 29 minutes. This proposal has now been incorporated into the proposals for an expansion beyond the Digbeth terminus of the Eastside extension.

The route is planned to continue eastwards by approximately 17 km (11 miles) to serve north Solihull via the B4128 to terminate at the HS2 Birmingham Interchange station, allowing passenger access by West Midlands Metro to the airport, National Exhibition Centre, Resorts World, and Resorts World Arena when open for passenger service. The proposed route would also pass directly by St Andrew's Stadium, home of Birmingham City FC, intended as an alternative to Bordesley station. Funding was approved in June 2025.

=== Wolverhampton extensions ===
==== Wolverhampton City Centre extension ====
The northern part of the extension scheme was the addition of a tram line into Wolverhampton city centre. The laying of the new track was completed in December 2019 and it was anticipated that passenger services would commence in 2021 once the renovation of Wolverhampton railway station has been completed. However, the project has been delayed.

It was originally proposed in 2009 as a single-track loop running clockwise from the existing St George's terminus via Princess Street, Lichfield Street and Pipers Row (for Wolverhampton bus station), with a spur to Wolverhampton station. An earlier plan would have served more of the city centre with the loop running along Lichfield Street, Queen Square, Victoria Street, Cleveland Street and Garrick Street to the Wolverhampton St George's tram stop. The 2009 scheme had an estimated cost of £30 million. In 2010 Centro considered revised proposals that involved an extended route along part of the Wolverhampton Ring Road, serving the University of Wolverhampton campus. The original loop scheme was selected and in 2012 Centro decided to proceed by constructing it in phases. A Transport and Works Act Order was approved in 2016, and in March 2014, a £2 billion connectivity funding package was announced to support a number of transport projects, including phase 1 of the Wolverhampton extension.

The first phase saw the construction of the eastern section of the Wolverhampton loop, consisting of a line branching off before the existing St George's terminus and running north up Pipers Row to terminate at the station. Northbound trams were to terminate alternately at the station and at St George's. The estimated completion date was 2015, although a succession of delays means that this section actually opened on 17 September 2023. The remaining part of the Wolverhampton loop will be completed at a later date, subject to funding.

=== Wednesbury–Brierley Hill extension ===
Wednesbury–Brierley Hill extension (WBHE) is an 11 km (6.8-mile) line which will run south-west from the existing route, branching off east of Wednesbury Great Western Street. The route will use the track bed of the disused South Staffordshire Line, running through Tipton and close to the former Dudley Town station. The line was last used by passenger trains in the 1960s and remained open to goods trains until 1993.

The line will then run on-street into Dudley town centre and through the new bus station, before following the A461 Southern Bypass to rejoin the railway corridor. After running along part of the former Oxford, Worcester and Wolverhampton Line, the tram line will then run along a new route to serve the Waterfront Business Park and Merry Hill Shopping Centre, terminating at Brierley Hill.

In 2012, the estimated cost of the WBHE was £268 million, and a frequency of ten trams per hour was envisaged, alternately serving Wolverhampton and Birmingham. A further extension to Stourbridge has also been proposed, with a junction at Canal Street, allowing trams to access the remainder of the Oxford, Worcester and Wolverhampton Line to Stourbridge Junction and possibly Stourbridge Town.

Network Rail have announced plans to reopen the South Staffordshire Line for the use of freight trains. Metro planners considered operating light rail trams on segregated tracks, but in 2011 put forward proposals to introduce tram-train operation on the route to allow Metro vehicles to share tracks with heavy rail freight trains.

Due to funding constraints, it was eventually decided to construct this extension in phases, with the section from Wednesbury to Dudley opening first.

This Metro route was one of the lines in the 1988 plan, and was originally expected to be completed around the mid 1990s. However, subsequent difficulties obtaining funding and planning permission led to work being delayed several times throughout the 1990s, 2000s and well into the 2010s.

In early 2017, work began to clear vegetation and disused track from the former railway line, ready for full scale construction to begin. Several bridges along the route were rebuilt over the next seven years.

In early 2021, full scale work started on construction of the line. It was estimated that the entire line to Brierley Hill would be completed by the end of 2023. The estimated cost of the extension is now £449 million. In July 2022, it was announced that due to spiralling costs, the line would be built in two phases. Phase 1 will see a line open to Dudley, construction of which was well underway by this stage. Phase 2 will extend the line to Brierley Hill and construction started in February 2025, estimated to cost £295 million.

The route from Wednesbury to Dudley is expected to open in 2027, with the route from Dudley to Brierley Hill to follow in 2028.

=== Other new lines ===
In September 2021, £2.1 billion in funding was applied for, of which £1 billion was received, for new Metro and upgraded bus routes around the West Midlands, consisting of many new lines and extensions, these are:

- Extension from Edgbaston to Quinton
  - This may be cut or extended depending on how much funding is given
- Extension from Brierley Hill to Stourbridge Junction
- New Line from Walsall to Wednesbury (offering two routes to Birmingham)
- New Line to New Cross Hospital
  - This would likely be an extension of the line to Wolverhampton Railway Station.
- Possible New Line branching off the Airport Line to Solihull Town Centre
  - First part under construction as part of the Birmingham Eastside Metro Extension, from Bull Street to Digbeth.

=== Historic planned extensions ===
In 2004, the proposed Phase Two expansion included five routes:

Birmingham City Centre to Great Barr
A 10 km (6.2 miles), 17-stop route from the city centre through Lancaster Circus and along the A34 corridor to the Birmingham/Walsall boundary, terminating near the M6 motorway junction 7. Transport for West Midlands later decided on a bus rapid transit route between Walsall and Solihull branded "Sprint".
Birmingham City Centre to Quinton
A 7.5 km (4.7 miles) route from the BCCE terminus at Five Ways along Hagley Road to Quinton.
Wolverhampton City Centre to Wednesfield, Willenhall, Walsall and Wednesbury
This 20.4 km (12.7 miles) "5Ws" route would connect Wolverhampton city centre to Wednesfield, Willenhall, Walsall and Wednesbury, and provide direct access to New Cross and Manor Hospitals, partially using the trackbed of the former Wolverhampton and Walsall Railway. This link was officially declared dead in the Express & Star on 23 October 2015. In place of this line, restoration of passenger services along the railway line between Wolverhampton and Walsall including new stations at Willenhall and Darlaston (James Bridge) was proposed.
Birmingham Airport links
via the A45 (now part of the East Birmingham to Solihull extension scheme).
via the A47: In September 2010, the Birmingham Post reported that a "£425 million rapid transit system" between Birmingham city centre and the airport "could involve a new light rail scheme". Centro strategy director Alex Burrows stated "the Birmingham City Centre to Birmingham Airport Rapid Transit plan will provide connectivity between the city centre, Birmingham Business Park and Chelmsley Wood".

During the mid-2000s, Birmingham City Council also evaluated the possibility of constructing an underground railway, and the scheme was advocated by the leader of the council, Mike Whitby, and deputy leader of the council, Paul Tilsley. A feasibility report by Jacobs Engineering and Deloitte concluded that the tunnelling scheme would be unaffordable and not meet government funding criteria.

== Accidents and incidents ==
- On 8 June 2006, T-69 tram, fleet number 06, collided with a taxi on New Swan Lane Level Crossing. The taxi was pushed across the junction and collided with a stationary lorry. The two occupants of the taxi were taken to hospital and released after two hours; neither the tram passengers nor the lorry driver suffered any injuries. The RAIB enquiry found that the tram driver failed to stop at the signal; the report noted that this was then the only level crossing on the network, and that there had been seven previous collisions there since the metro came into operation in 1999, but all of these had been a result of failures by road traffic users.
- On 19 December 2006, trams 09 and 10 collided in Winson Green, injuring a group of people while en route to the Metro's then Birmingham Snow Hill terminus.
- On 19 August 2019, tram 31 was derailed after colliding with a vehicle in Wolverhampton injuring five people.
- On 11 June 2021, all 21 tram cars were taken out of service "after a fault was discovered." Services resumed step by step following Tuesday onwards.
- On 13 November 2021, services were suspended again due to cracks being found in the bodywork of some more trams. The limitations in services lasted until 12 February 2022.
- On 20 March 2022, services were suspended until further notice due to even more cracks in the bodywork of some older trams.
- On 13 June 2024, a woman was seriously injured after being hit by a tram in West Bromwich.

== See also ==
- Coventry Very Light Rail – planned light rail system in Coventry
