= Edgbaston Village tram stop =

West Midlands Metro tram stop

Edgbaston Village
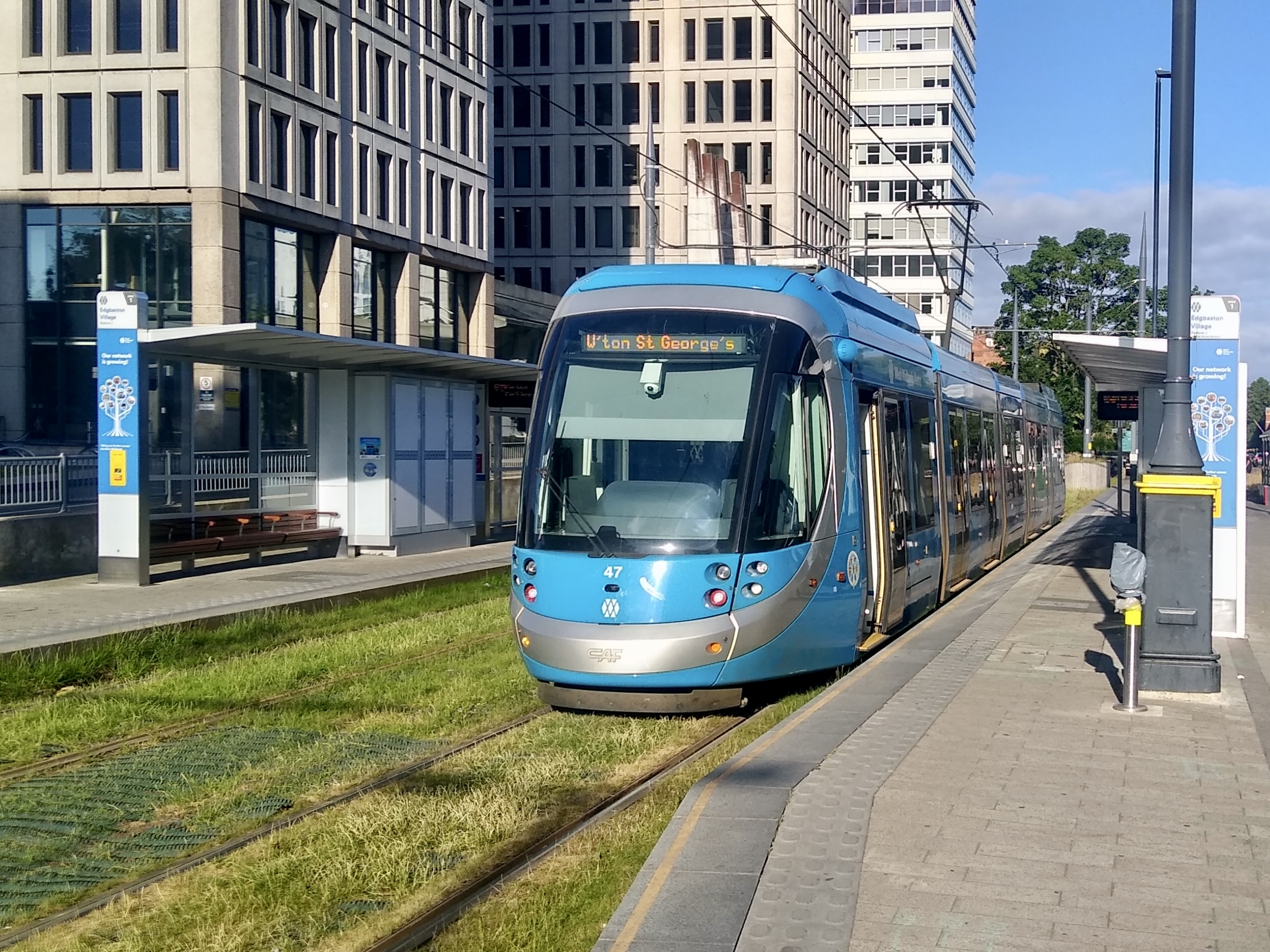
- View from the east in 2026

General information
- Location: Edgbaston; England
- Coordinates: 52.47201°N 1.92351°W
- Line: Line 1 (Edgbaston Village/Millennium Point – Wolverhampton station)
- Platforms: 2

Other information
- Website: www.westmidlandsmetro.com/maps/stops/edgbaston-village/

History
- Opened: 17 July 2022
Location

Edgbaston Village is a tram stop on the West Midlands Metro located in Edgbaston. It opened on 17 July 2022 as the terminus of the Birmingham Westside extension, taking over from the Library. It is named after the newly created retail district in which it sits.

Preceding station	West Midlands Metro	Following station
Five Ways	Line 1	Terminus
