= Alan Garner (politician) =

- Born: Alan George Garner; 5 June 1929; Wolverhampton, England
- Died: 1996
- Known for: Member of Wolverhampton Council; Vice-chair of the West Midlands Passenger Transport Authority
- Spouse: Mary Garner

Alan George Garner BEM (5 June 1929 – 1996) was a British Labour Party activist and trade unionist. Born and raised in Wolverhampton, he was a member of Wolverhampton Council, for the Spring Vale and Heath Town wards, from 1973 until his death, and vice-chair of the West Midlands Passenger Transport Authority between 1992 and 1996, during which time he was a strong advocate of the Midland Metro.

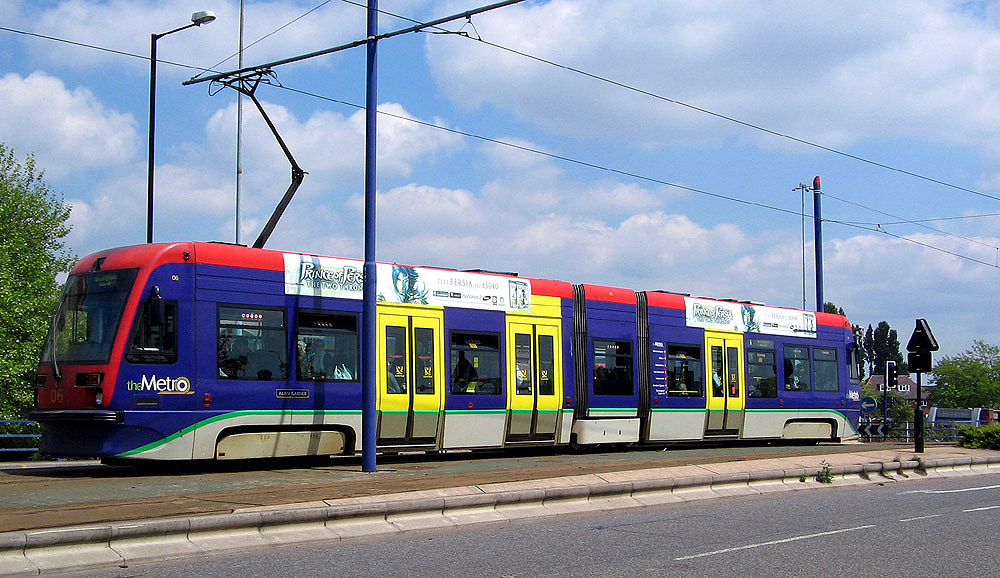
Midland Metro T-69 tram number 06, "Alan Garner"

He received the British Empire Medal in the 1990 Birthday Honours. Midland Metro named an AnsaldoBreda T-69 tram after him in August 2003.
