= National Express (disambiguation) =

National Express is a British long-distance coach company.

National Express may also refer to:

- "National Express" (song), a song by the Divine Comedy
- Mobico Group, formerly National Express Group, parent of the coach company

== Other divisions of Mobico Group ==
- National Express Coventry, bus operator in the West Midlands
- National Express East Anglia, train operating company that operated the Greater Anglia franchise between 2004 and 2012
- National Express East Coast, train operating company that operated the InterCity East Coast franchise between 2007 and 2009
- National Express Germany, train operator in Germany
- National Express Midland Metro, tram operator in the West Midlands
- National Express West Midlands, bus operator in the West Midlands
