= Coventry Corporation Transport =

Operator of trams and buses in Coventry, Warwickshire

Coventry Transport
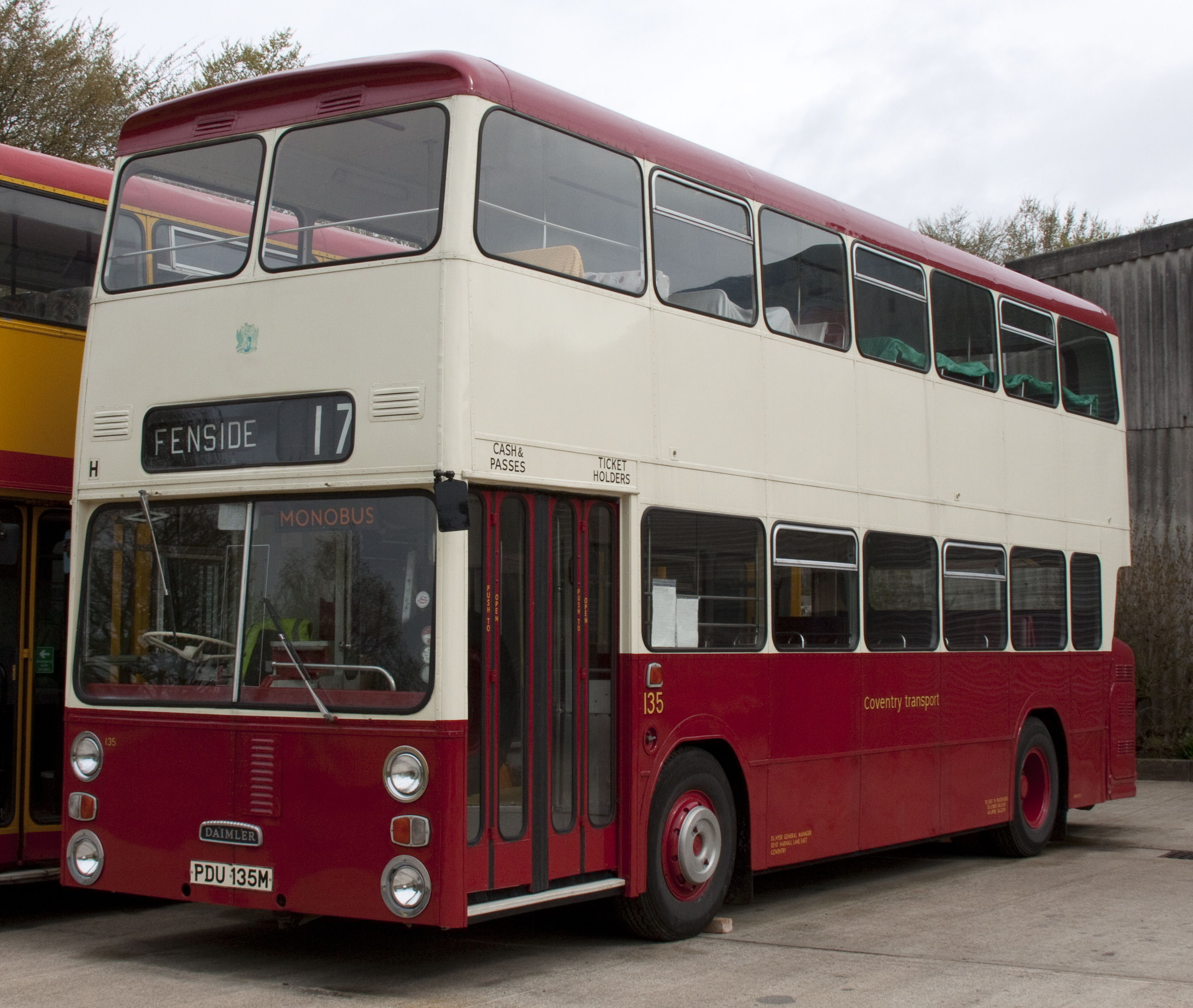
- Preserved Coventry Daimler Fleetline
- Commenced operation: 1 January 1912
- Ceased operation: 1 April 1974
- Service area: Coventry
- Destinations: Coventry, Bedworth, Baginton, Berkswell
- Operator: Corporation of the City of Coventry

Coventry Corporation Transport was the operator of trams and motorbuses in Coventry, Warwickshire from 1912 to 1974. The operations of Coventry Corporation Transport passed to West Midlands Passenger Transport Executive in the local government reorganisation of 1974.

== History ==
On 1 January 1912 Coventry Corporation took over the operations of the Coventry Electric Tramways Company which had until then ran the tramway in the city, a service which had begun in 1895. The purchase price of £220,638 included 13 miles of track, 41 double deck open-top electric tramcars and the depots on Foleshill Road and at Priestley's Bridge on Stoney Stanton Road. A more comprehensive history of the city's tramway system is found at Coventry Corporation Tramways.

=== First buses ===
The first motor bus service began on 30 March 1914 using six locally made Maudslay vehicles. These were open top double deckers with solid tyres, no windscreen and seats for 34 passengers, and each cost £739. The route was from Stoke Heath to the Fire Station in Hales Street. During the first week of operation, £107 4s 4d was taken in fares. A further service to Hearsall Lane started in May but both were short lived as the chassis were requisitioned by the War Office in September that year.

After the Great War, bus services resumed in 1919 and a bus garage at Harnall Lane was opened in 1921 adjoining the Priestley's Bridge premises. The tramway system reached its peak of 58 tramcars that same year with 6 services to Bedworth, Bell Green, Stoke, Earlsdon, the Allesley Road and the Railway Station.

At the 1925 Commercial Motor Show, Maudslay exhibited one of the first covered top double deckers which the Corporation subsequently purchased. It was not until 1927 however that pneumatic tyres were first fitted to a bus.

In 1931, Pool Meadow Bus Station was opened to cater for nine main routes into the city. The following year the first tram route was abandoned and plans were drawn up to gradually replace the whole system.

The general manager T. R. Whitehead retired in 1933 and was replaced by Ronald Fearnley, a post which he held for nearly three decades. He became a pioneer in the transport industry, and worked closely with the Daimler Company in the development of an advanced lightweight all-metal bus with 60 seats yet within the maximum length and weight regulations of the time.

The last remaining independently operated services in the city were purchased in 1936, and the department could then complete its coverage of the area with routes to Baginton, Burton Green and Berkswell.

=== World War II ===
The substantial damage caused by the air raid of 14 November 1940 finally led to the tramway system being completely abandoned. It was later reported that the 2700 tons of material salvaged from the tramway track was sufficient to make 180 heavy tanks.

Despite considerable damage to buses and premises, on 16 November, some services were resumed operating from the outer termini to as close to the city centre as conditions permitted. Within a week regular services were almost back to normal, ensuring workers could reach the factories for vital war work.

By February 1941 only 73 buses out of the total fleet of 181 were undamaged and vehicles had to be hired from many other operators around the country. Overnight parking was dispersed to temporary facilities at Highfield Road football ground and the Lythalls Lane greyhound stadium.

Supply of new buses was limited during the war and those that were delivered were of government controlled austere construction, the most striking feature being the wooden slat seats.

=== After the war ===
In 1948 restrictions on purchasing new vehicles were relaxed, and the bus fleet was quickly standardised almost entirely on locally built Daimler double deckers with an open platform at the rear and the diesel engine at the front. The last petrol-engined bus was replaced in 1949. Many of the wartime specification buses were in poor condition and had to be re-bodied, some at the department's Keresley works.

Notable exceptions to the Daimler purchasing policy were a London Transport style AEC and a Crossley which had a distinctive mainly cream colour scheme and initially had an automatic gearbox. There was also a batch of nine of the last buses built by the Maudslay company.

Services which in the war had finished at 8:30 in the evening were gradually extended to 11:00 pm. 1950 was the peak year of operation; 110 million passengers were carried but the increased ownership of private cars had a progressively adverse effect on public transport. Many of these cars were produced in city factories and it also became increasingly difficult to attract sufficient bus drivers with the wages being paid by such industries.

In 1954 a new garage was built at Sandy Lane with covered capacity for 150 buses, half the fleet, and the Foleshill site was closed. Odd and even numbered vehicles were then split between Sandy Lane and Harnall Lane respectively.

=== "Monobus" era ===
Up until 1965, all vehicles required a crew of two, a driver plus a conductor who took the fares. However, in that year, new rear-engined front-entrance double deckers were purchased and these could be operated by one man. In addition they were built to a newly permitted length of 30 feet and could thus seat a dozen more passengers. Although initially Leyland vehicles were used, the fleet subsequently again became standardised on Daimlers, using their Fleetline chassis.

With these new vehicles a distinctive feature of Coventry buses since the 1930s was omitted, the twin side-by-side destination displays. Thereafter the service number and destination displays adopted numerous different layouts.

To speed up the process of passengers boarding, in 1968 a batch of vehicles with separate entrance and exit doors entered service, but within a few years the standard reverted to a single-door design.

Continuing difficulties in recruiting drivers led the corporation to try another approach. Although conductresses had been employed since the First World War, it was not until 1970 that the first two women drivers completed their training. It was the department's policy that drivers should first qualify as conductors and that inspectors should have previously been drivers. Subsequently, one of these ladies did become an inspector, a unique achievement.

Starting in 1970, new buses were painted in a lighter red and ivory scheme, which was intended to gradually replace the maroon and cream that had been used on previous buses. The department also operated several coaches but for some years these had sported sky blue colours.

On 1 April 1974, the entire bus operation was taken over by the West Midlands Passenger Transport Executive (WMPTE) and Coventry Corporation Transport ceased to exist. The fleet at that time comprised 185 front loading double deckers, 116 rear loading double deckers, two single deckers, one coach and one minibus.

With the city coat of arms removed from every bus, the familiar maroon and cream paint scheme also began to disappear from the city streets. As buses were due for repainting they gained the blue and cream colours of the Birmingham company.

== Preserved vehicles ==
A number of former Coventry Transport vehicles have been saved from the scrapyard.

EVC 244 is single deck Daimler COG5, new in 1940, with 38 seat body by Park Royal. It passed to Derby Corporation in 1949 as a driver training vehicle. Since 2009 it has undergone an extensive restoration back to its Coventry condition.

EKV 966, a 1944 double deck Daimler CWA6 originally with a wartime specification body, was rebuilt after the war and then became a maintenance vehicle in 1959. It is now owned by the Transport Museum and is to be converted back to bus condition.

GKV 94 is typical of the first hundred buses purchased after the war. It is a 1950 Daimler CVA6 with AEC engine and 60 seat Metro-Cammell bodywork. It was acquired for preservation in 1968 and is currently undergoing major renovation.

GKV 105 from 1949 is one of the minority of single deckers purchased. It is a Daimler CVD6 with 34 seat bodywork by Brush and Daimler engine.

Four Daimler CVG6 double deckers typical of the late fifties and early sixties survive. All have Metro-Cammell bodies and Gardner engines. Travel De Courcey runs VWK 239, new in 1958 which has 60 seat bodywork. XVC 290 is a similar bus from 1959 though now shortened and converted to single deck as a tree lopper. 333 CRW and 334 CRW from 1963 are now owned by the Museum and De Courcey respectively. They have 63 seat bodies and are from the last batch of rear platform buses.

KWK 23F, a 1968 Daimler rear engined Fleetline which originally had 72 seat bodywork by Eastern Coachworks with separate entrance and exit doors.

PDU 125M, another Fleetline was acquired by the Museum, painted in sky blue colours and converted to open top.

PDU 135M, a similar 1973 Daimler Fleetline with 74 seat body by East Lancs is typical of the standard monobus design.
