= Coventry Very Light Rail =

Light rail tram system in Coventry, UK

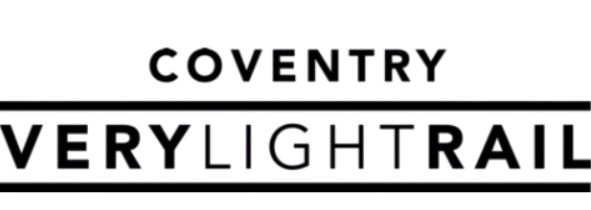

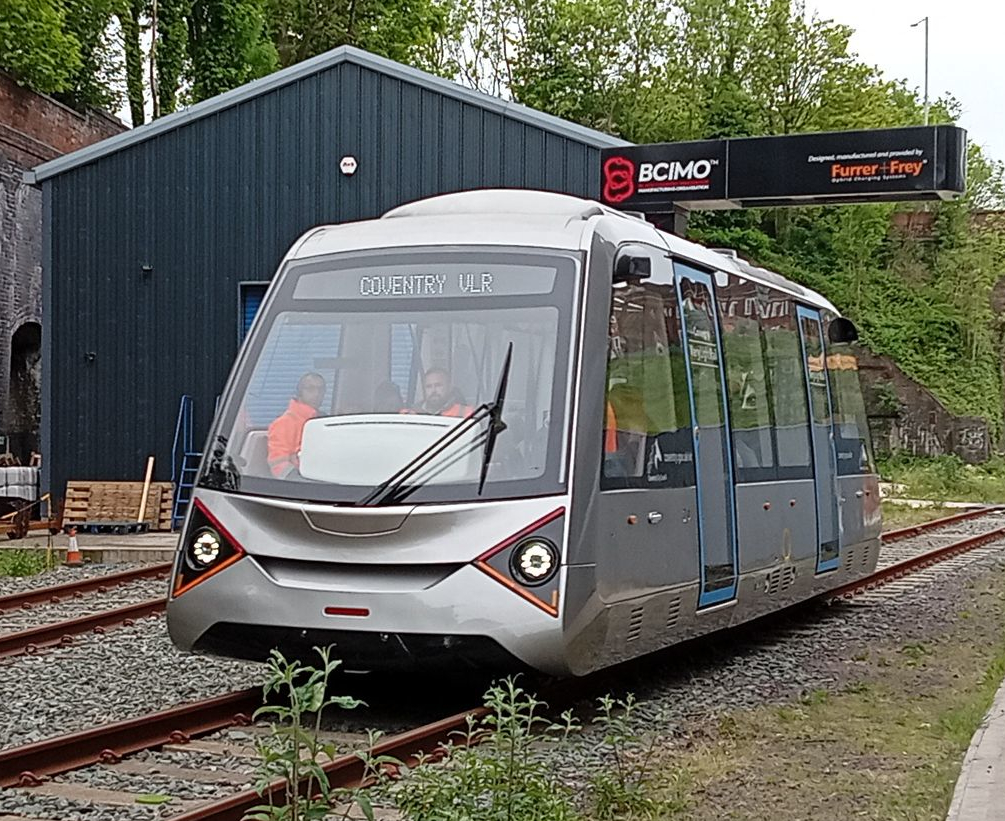
- A Coventry Very Light Rail Vehicle in 2025

Overview
- Owner: Coventry City Council
- Locale: Coventry, West Midlands
- Transit type: Tram / Light rail
- Line number: (1 planned)
- Chief executive: Nick Mallinson
- Website: www.coventry.gov.uk/coventry-light-rail

Operation
- Number of vehicles: 1

Coventry Very Light Rail (CVLR) is a light rail / tram system under construction in Coventry. The system has been promoted as being the first of its kind in the United Kingdom. When finished, it will also be the first tram network to operate in Coventry since the closure of the Coventry Corporation Tramways system in 1940.

Plans to establish such a system were first announced during 2016; development work was headed by the Warwick Manufacturing Group (WMG) and Transport Design International (TDI). It was designed to be substantially cheaper to establish than conventional tramways and light railways, making use of batteries to avoid installing expensive overhead line equipment along much of the route, along with a new, thinner track system that is easier to lay and repair. The vehicle is standard gauge, so would be compatible with other networks in Great Britain.

During early 2018, WMG started formalising its procurement arrangements with various industrial partners to complete development and produce the vehicle. Construction of the first prototype vehicle has been completed. During 2019, it was announced that the first line of the system was planned to be operational by 2024. Further expansion of the network is intended after this point to cover various commercial, residential, and industrial districts of Coventry, as well as linking up with other transit hubs.

== History ==
Proposals for Coventry to adopt this technology were first publicly revealed during 2016. The concept for this mass transit system originated from the Warwick Manufacturing Group (WMG), an institution that is closely associated with the University of Warwick; much of the system's early development was performed by TDI prior to other entities becoming involved. In January 2018, WMG commenced its procurement process, in which various industry partners were selected to develop and produce aspects of the vehicle. During June 2018, it was announced that WMG had awarded a contract to the Stratford-upon-Avon based transport specialist Transport Design International (TDI). In accordance with this selection, TDI has been assigned overall responsibility for the design and manufacture of the vehicles, working in close cooperation with WMG to do so.

Further elements of the system have been contracted to numerous third parties. Tikab & Arogus will perform both the design and manufacture of both the bogies and the control systems. Transcal is responsible for producing miscellaneous metal fabricated elements, along with the seating and interior fittings. Transport for West Midlands (TfWM) had been appointed to as the lead authority on all operational aspects of the system. That same month, it was suggested that an initial section of the system, running between the railway station and the city centre, could open as early as 2021.

=== Track and vehicle ===
During early 2019, it was announced that development of the system had reached an advanced stage, along with an initial route and launch date. It is reportedly scheduled for the first demonstrator vehicle to be completed by the end of 2023 or the start of 2024, after which it will be subject to a series of tests in advance of its delivery during the following year. Testing will be conducted at the Very Light Rail National Innovation Centre in Castle Hill, Dudley, West Midlands. In 2024, it was stated that the first route from the railway station to the city centre would not be operational until at least 2026.

In early 2026, plans were approved for an 800 metre long demonstrator track between Coventry railway station, and Coventry University Technology Park. The route will be double track and the test vehicle will run in actual traffic. Coventry City Council's website (coventry.gov.uk) states that this 800 metre phase "is funded through the City Region Sustainable Transport Settlement (CRSTS) and is scheduled for completion by Spring/Summer 2027".

== Technology ==
The concept of 'Very Light Rail' (VLR) has been developed as a means of providing a light rail system at a much lower cost and with much reduced construction times than traditional tramways or light rail systems. This will allow for such systems to be rolled out across smaller towns and cities so they can gain the benefits of a tram system at a considerably more affordable cost. The system had reportedly been engineered for compatibility with the existing West Midlands Metro mass transit network. It has been envisioned that services upon the network could be operated upon a 'turn up and go' frequency at a typical interval of every three to four minutes, rather than using a timetable.

It has been stated that the cost of building the system will equal £7 million per kilometre, which is substantially less than the £35–60 million per kilometre of traditional tram systems.

=== Vehicles ===
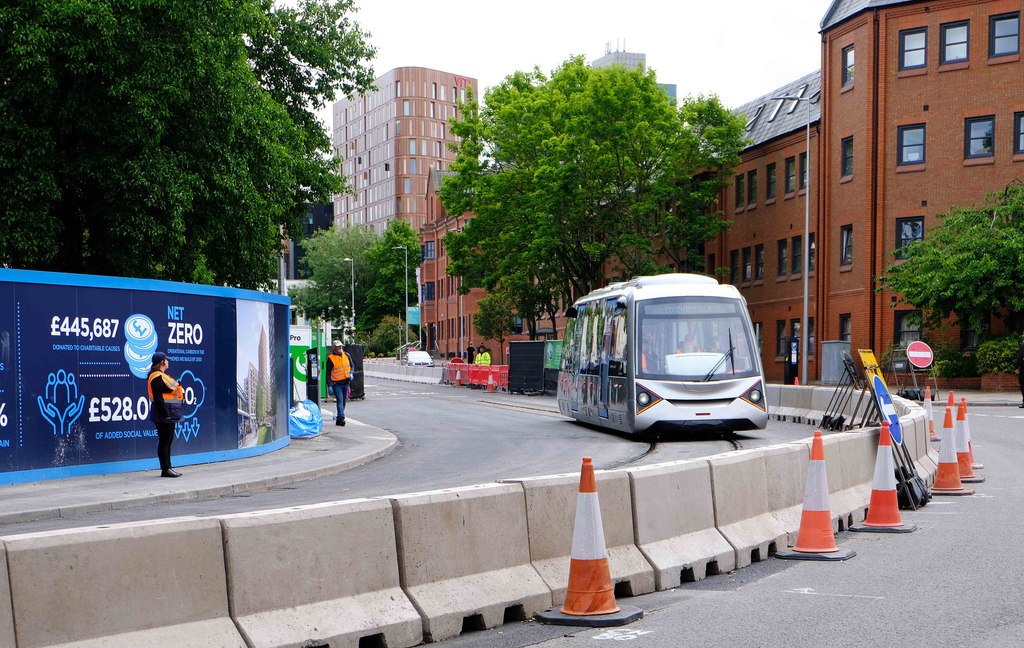
VLR Demonstration in 2025.

The VLR concept uses lightweight vehicles, each typically accommodating 50 passengers; of these 20 would be seated while 30 would stand. It has been proposed for these vehicles to eventually be operated autonomously. Guidance is to be primarily achieved from its rails. The vehicle are primarily composed of steel and aluminium, while also incorporating several composite components. The vehicles are to be equipped with batteries; when combined with rapid charging systems, the need for overhead line equipment to be installed throughout the route is dispensed with, resulting in reduced installation costs. Being electrically powered, there are zero emissions at point of use. The first vehicle left the production line in March 2021, and was taken on a showcase tour before being taken to Dudley for testing.

=== Track ===
Representatives from Dudley Council & Coventry City Council during a tour at the VLR test centre at Castle Hill, Dudley.

A major feature of the system is the track, which is prefabricated. This is relatively lightweight and shallower than traditional tramway track, being only 300 mm (12 in) deep, enabling it to be laid over existing utilities like water and gas pipelines and thus avoiding the need for these to be excavated and relocated; all of these factors make it quicker and cheaper to install. If required, the track can be dismantled and reused at other locations, being held together by a series of clips; this feature has also been promoted for ease of maintenance. The track is seated upon slabs, the materials of which can comprise a high-strength foam core with a recycled plastic coating.

In 2025, Coventry City Council announced that construction had begun on a 220-metre (720 ft) test track between Greyfriars Road and Coventry Market on Queen Victoria Road. The council opened the test line in May 2025, in order to allow the public to give feedback of the vehicles and operation of the VLR system.

== Network ==
The first proposed route for the system may be from Coventry railway station to University Hospital via Coventry city centre. This route was originally proposed to be operational by 2024 which did not occur. In 2025 however it was suggested that the first route could be to an investment zone near Coventry Airport. Another proposed route would link the railway station with the University of Warwick, and another to Coventry Arena. In the long term, the city council has intentions to construct a total of four routes which are intended to connect the major residential, industrial and commercial areas across the city, as well as a direct connection to the Birmingham Interchange station on HS2 near Birmingham Airport via Kenpas Highway and Allesley (possibly). Furthermore, it is hoped that the successful demonstration of the technology at Coventry will give developers and planners elsewhere confidence to deploy their own networks at other locations. In 2025 it was suggested by councillor Jim O'Boyle, that the first route could be operational by 2027.

Before a first full line to the begins construction later in the year, the route of which is still undergoing development. Two options for the first route have been identified by the council and combined authority, one of which would head from the City Centre to the University Hospital via Fargo Village & Wyken, the second route would head to a new modern industrial park near the village of Baginton, via Whitley.

== Funding ==
The scheme has been included in a wider £15 billion plan to reshape mass transit in the West Midlands. £2.4 million of funding for its development has been sourced from the UK government's Local Growth Fund through the Coventry and Warwickshire Local Enterprise Partnership. An additional £12.2 million was secured from the devolution deal for the West Midlands Combined Authority (WMCA). Additional backing may come from private enterprises, efforts to secure such partnerships commenced during late 2019. Dudley Borough Council acquired Black Country Innovative Manufacturing Organisation "BCIMO" (including the Very Light rail Innovation Centre) in July, securing its investments and the future of the project.

== See also ==
- Coventry Corporation Tramways – the first tramway system in Coventry which ceased operation in 1940.
- West Midlands Metro – another tramway system in the West Midlands.
- Pre-Series Revolution VLR – another ultra light vehicle.
- Parry People Movers – another ultra light vehicle.
- Msheireb Tram – another system without overhead lines.
