= West Midlands Metro rolling stock =

Rolling stock of the West Midlands Metro line in the West Midlands, England

The West Midlands Metro is a passenger light rail line in the West Midlands conurbation in England, which opened in 1999. Its rolling stock consists of 21 CAF Urbos 3 trams which came into service in 2014/15, replacing the older T-69 trams which had operated the line since 1999.

== Urbos 3 & Urbos 100 ==
Urbos 3/Urbos 100
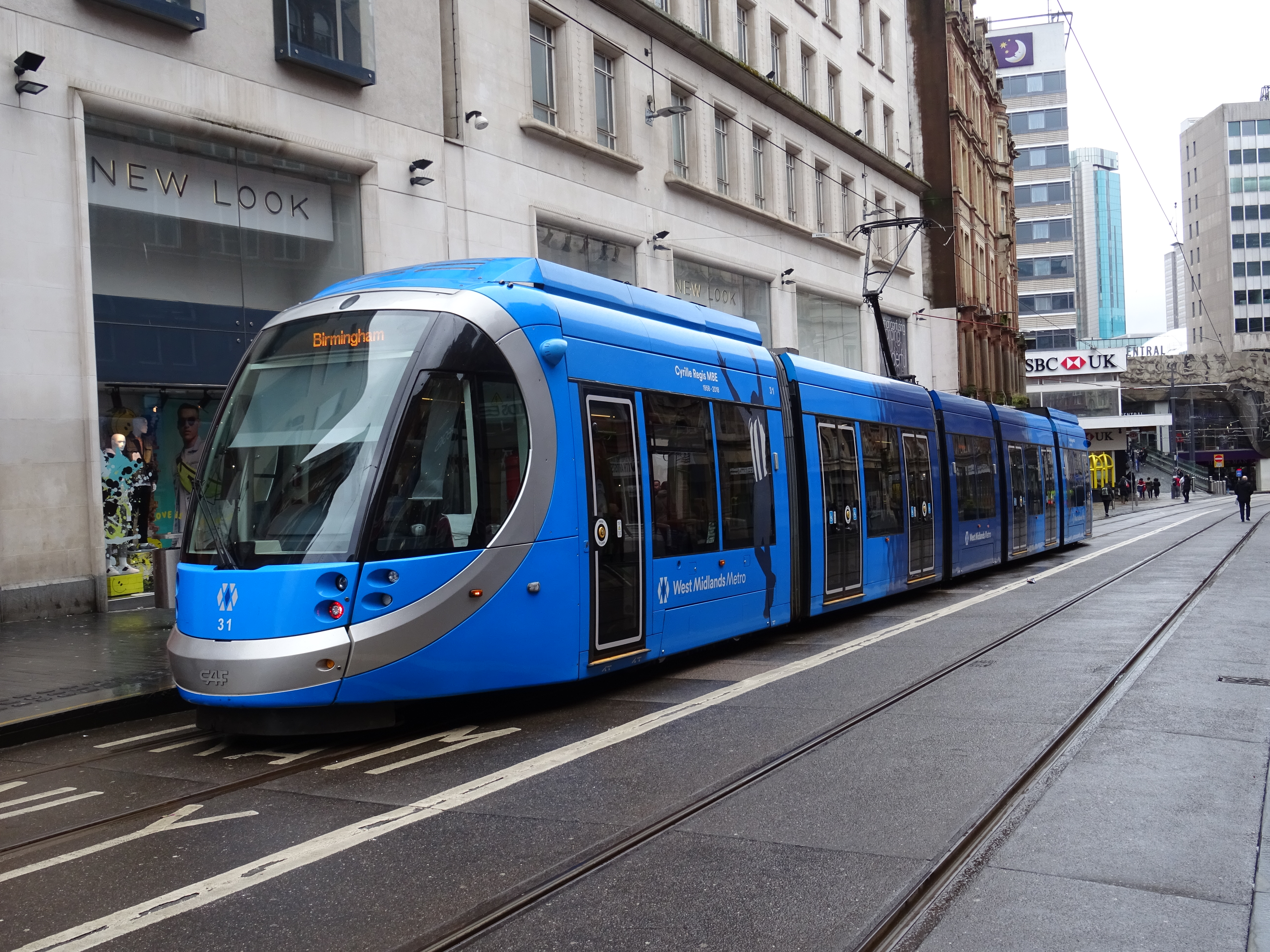
- Urbos 3 No.31 on Corporation Street
- In service: 5 September 2014 – present
- Manufacturer: CAF
- Built at: Zaragoza, Spain
- Replaced: All remaining T69
- Constructed: 2012–2015 (Urbos 3); 2019–2023 (Urbos 100)
- Number built: 42
- Number in service: 39
- Formation: 5 sections with 4 articulations.
- Fleet numbers: 17–37 (Urbos 3); 38–58 (Urbos 100)
- Capacity: 210 (54 seats, 156 standing)
- Operator: West Midlands Metro
- Line served: Wolverhampton – Birmingham

Specifications
- Car length: 32,966 mm (108 ft 1 7/8 in)
- Width: 2.65 m (8 ft 8 3/8 in)
- Height: 3.4 m (11 ft 1 7/8 in)
- Wheel diameter: 590–510 mm (23–20 in) (new–worn)
- Maximum speed: 70 km/h (43 mph)
- Weight: 56 tonnes (55 long tons; 62 short tons)
- Traction motors: 8 × Traktionssysteme Austria TMR 36-18-4 70 kW (90 hp)
- Power output: 560 kW (750 hp)
- Gear ratio: 5.44 : 1 (49 / 9)
- Electric systems: 750 V DC (nominal) from overhead catenary
- Current collection: Pantograph
- UIC classification: Bo′+0′+2′+0′+Bo′
- Track gauge: 1,435 mm (4 ft 8 1/2 in) standard gauge

A new fleet of 21 CAF Urbos 3 trams began to enter service in September 2014, they replaced the old T-69 fleet in 2015. In February 2012 Centro named CAF the preferred bidder for a contract to supply 19 to 25 Urbos 3 trams. A £40 million firm order for 20 was subsequently signed, with options for five more. The first of the new trams was unveiled at the Wednesbury depot in October 2013, with the first four entering service on 5 September 2014.

The new fleet provided an increased service of 10 trams per hour in each direction, with an increased capacity of 210 passengers per tram, compared with the 156 passengers on the former T69 trams. The Urbos 3 trams are 33 m (108 ft 3 in) long; 9 m (29 ft 6 in) longer than the former T69 stock, and have a maximum operating speed of 70 km/h (43 mph). They are low floor throughout, and consist of five sections with four articulations. Three of the modules are mounted on bogies and the other two modules are suspended.

At 2.65 m (8 ft 8 3/8 in) wide, The Urbos 3 trams are slightly wider than the 2.48 m (8 ft 1 5/8 in) wide T69s. The line was closed for two weeks during March and April 2013, in order for the platforms on each of the stops to be narrowed by 15 cm (5.9 in) to accommodate the new trams. The T69s were modified with wider steps to be compatible with the narrower platforms.

In 2016, it was announced that the Urbos 3 fleet would be fitted with rechargeable batteries to allow them to operate along various extensions of the Midland Metro network intended to be constructed without overhead lines. Tram 18 was the first to be fitted with batteries in 2017, with the final tram, number 26, being fitted by April 2020. Tram 31 was the first to receive the new blue livery and was relaunched on 16 July 2018. In May 2019, tram 19 was given a silver and blue livery with special logos to mark the 20th anniversary of the West Midlands Metro on 30 May 2019. It was given the full blue livery in February 2021. All trams now carry this livery.

In October 2019, an order was signed for 21 new Urbos 100 trams, with the option of a further 29. Eight of these were delivered in 2021, three within 2022, with the remaining 8 being delivered until November 2023.

Cracks have been detected in the older Urbos 3 trams resulting in suspension of services, the most recent in March 2022. The newer Urbos 100 vehicles are not affected by these bodywork defects.

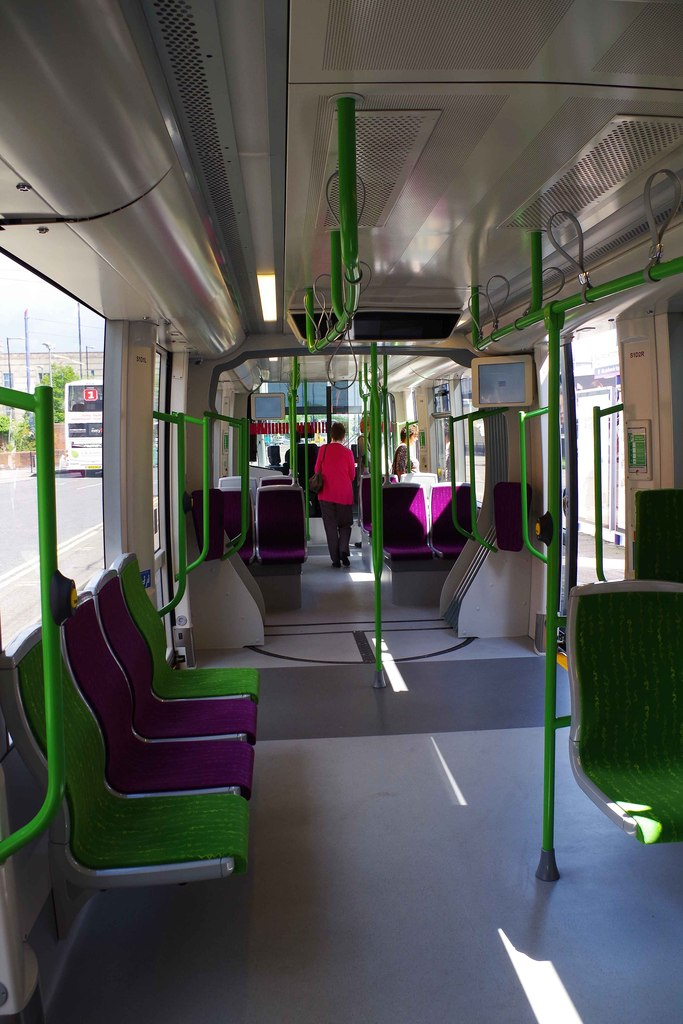
Interior of an Urbos 3

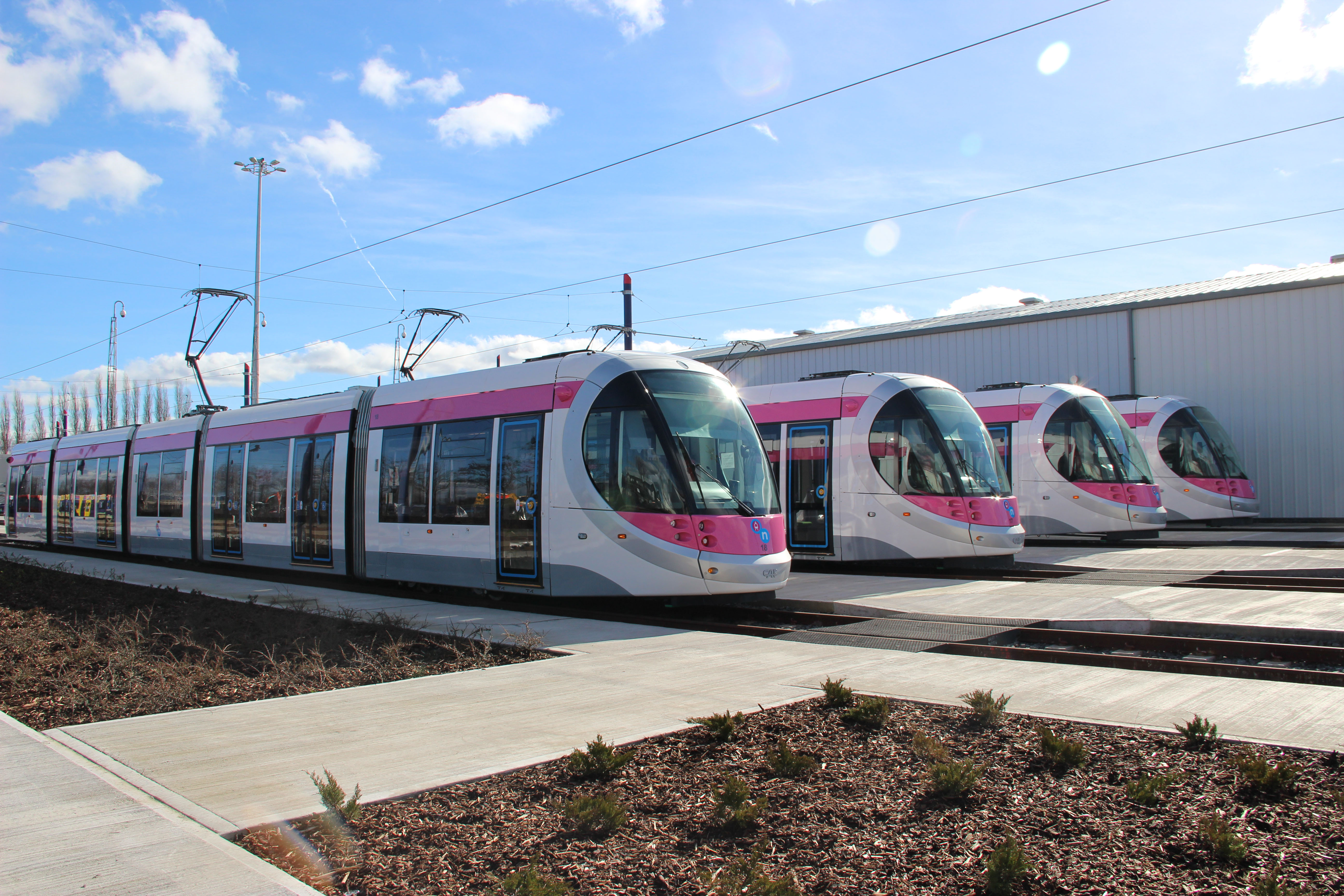
Urbos 3s in their original liveries at the depot in Wednesbury

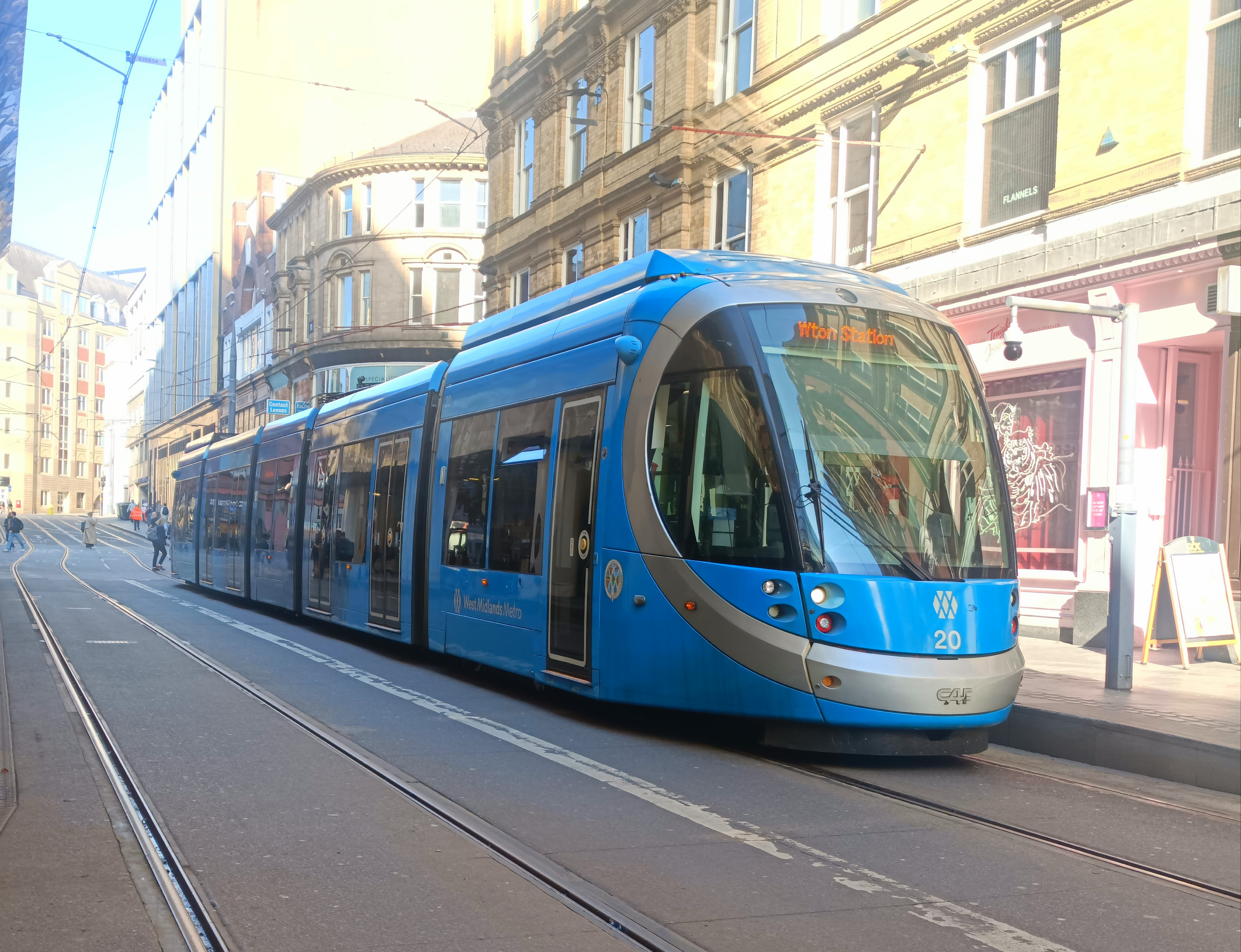
Urbos 3 No.20 in current livery at Grand Central tram stop

== Former fleet ==
=== T-69 ===
T-69
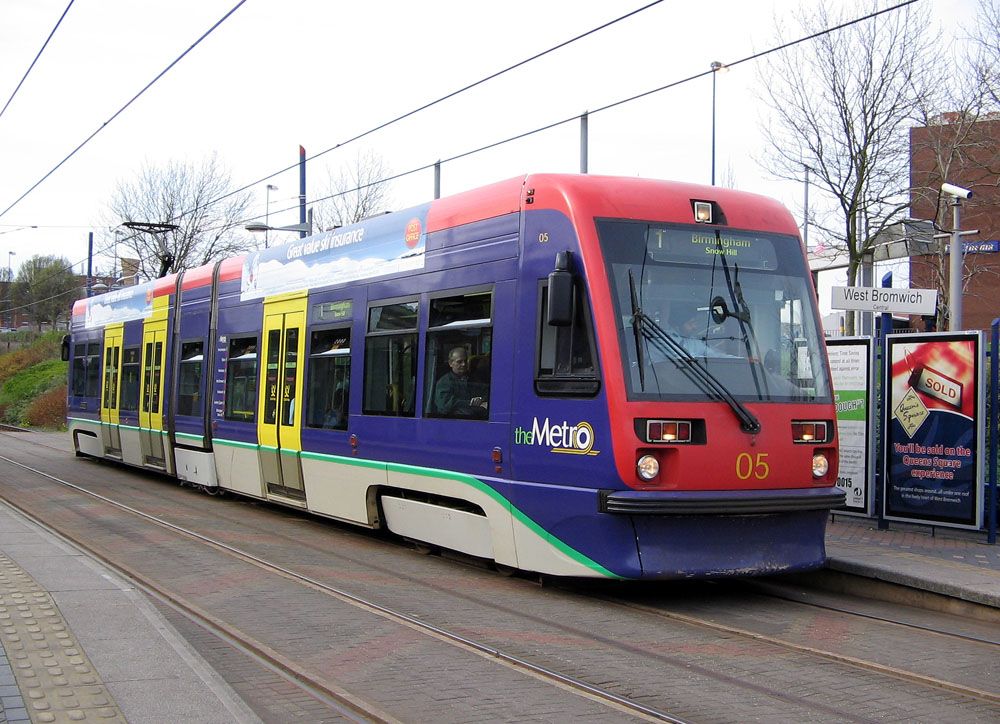
- Tram 05 in original livery at West Bromwich Central
- In service: 30 May 1999 – 14 August 2015
- Manufacturer: AnsaldoBreda
- Built at: Naples, Italy
- Constructed: 1996–1999
- Refurbished: 2013
- Scrapped: 2018
- Number built: 16
- Number scrapped: 13
- Formation: 2 sections per tram, articulated intersection
- Fleet numbers: 01–16
- Capacity: 156 (56 seats, 100 standing)
- Operator: National Express Midland Metro
- Line served: Wolverhampton – Birmingham Snow Hill

Specifications
- Car body construction: Aluminium
- Car length: 24.36 m (79 ft 11 in)
- Width: 2.48 m (8 ft 1 5/8 in)
- Height: 3.7 m (12 ft 1 5/8 in)
- Wheel diameter: 680–620 mm (27–24 in) (new–worn)
- Maximum speed: 43.5 mph (70 km/h)
- Weight: 38 tonnes (37 long tons; 42 short tons) per tram
- Traction motors: 2 × 210 kW (282 hp) separately-excited DC motor
- Power output: 420 kW (563 hp)
- Electric system: 750 V DC (nominal) from overhead catenary
- Current collection: Brecknell Willis high reach pantograph
- UIC classification: B′+2′+B′
- Track gauge: 1,435 mm (4 ft 8 1/2 in)

Sixteen T-69 trams were the original fleet, introduced into service in 1999, These were withdrawn from service gradually during 2014/15 as the new Urbos 3 fleet was introduced. The last, no. 16, was withdrawn from service in August 2015.

The T69s were used only on the Midland Metro, and were built by the Italian company AnsaldoBreda. Their closest "brothers" were the SL95 running in Oslo, Norway, as well as the mechanically similar Manchester Metrolink T-68A trams. At 24.36 m (79 ft 11 in) long, the T-69s were the shortest modern tramcars in Britain. The vehicles were articulated, resting on three bogies, and had low floors over about 60% of the length. The central section of the trams was low floor, with inwards facing seating at the sides, while at each end was a raised seating area, accessible by steps. Each tram had 56 seats, with space for another 100 standing. They were accessible from three 1.25 m (4 ft 1 in) wide entrances on each side, with twin plug doors.

When delivered, all trams carried a livery of a purple body, red fronts, grey skirt and yellow doors, but trams 05, 07, 09, and 10 were refurbished and repainted in Network West Midlands' silver and magenta livery, tram 11 was also repainted, this unit was repainted into the original Birmingham Corporation Tramways. From their entry into service, each tram had a roller-blind style destination board; in 2013, these were replaced with new LED Destination boards on all trams.

Most trams were named after local celebrities or people of note. After withdrawal 1-15 were placed in storage at Long Marston. In February 2016 proposals were unveiled to convert the Isle of Wight Island Line into a tram line. It was reported that the remaining T-69s could be purchased second hand and re-used for this scheme. However, this proposal never came to fruition, and in 2018 tram 11 was donated for preservation. The remaining 12 were sold for scrap. In July 2022 Transport for West Midlands scrapped "preserved" tram 11. Trams 07 and 10 remain in storage at Long Marston. In June 2022 tram 10 was repainted into an advert for British Transport Police for use during a demonstration at the annual Rail Live event.

Tram 16 was moved from Long Marston to the Very Light Rail National Innovation Centre in Dudley in November 2023, where it was refurbished and re-liveried as a battery-powered test tram.

Key:	Stored	Scrapped

Fleet number	Tram Name	Livery	Notes
01		Original (blue, red, grey, yellow)	Scrapped
02		Original	Scrapped
03	Ray Lewis	Original	Scrapped
04	Sir Frank Whittle	Original	Scrapped
05	Sister Dora	Silver and Magenta	Scrapped
06	Alan Garner	Original	Scrapped; was involved in 2006 collision
07	Billy Wright	Silver and Magenta	Stored at Long Marston
08	Joseph Chamberlain	Original	Scrapped
09	Jeff Astle	Silver and Magenta	Scrapped
10	John Stanley Webb	British Transport Police advert	Stored at Long Marston
11	Theresa Stewart	Birmingham Corporation	Was expected to be preserved by Birmingham City Council Scrapped July 2022
12		Original	Scrapped
13	Anthony Nolan	Original	Scrapped
14	Jim Eames	Original	Scrapped
15	Agenoria	Original	Scrapped
16	Gerwyn John	Original	Refurbished at the Very Light Rail National Innovation Centre in Dudley, as a test tram.

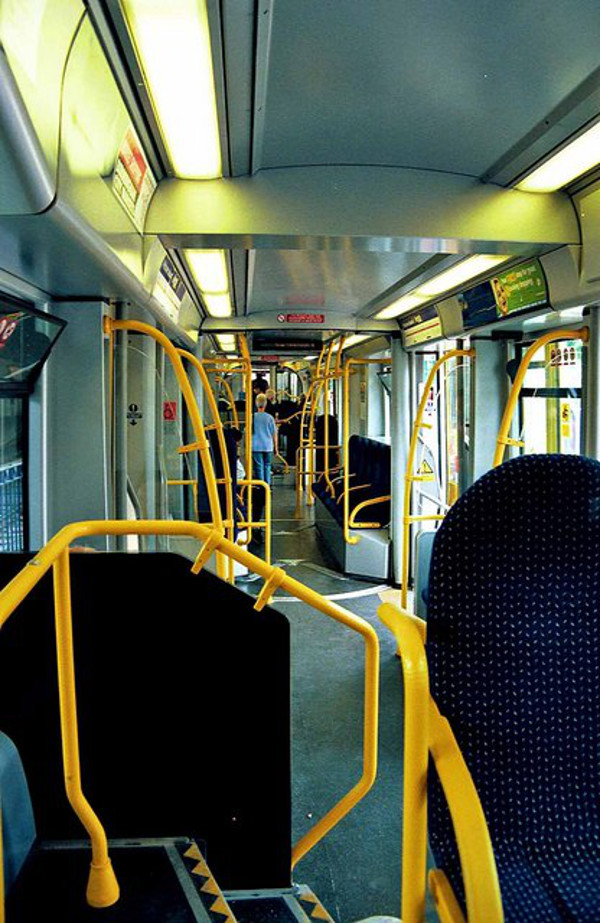
Interior of a T69

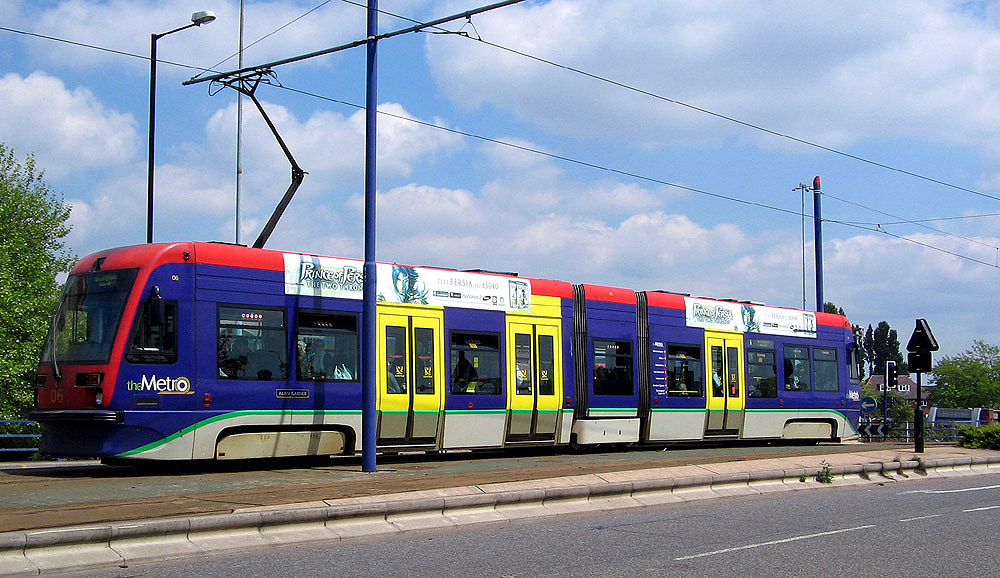
Sideways view of tram 06 in original livery

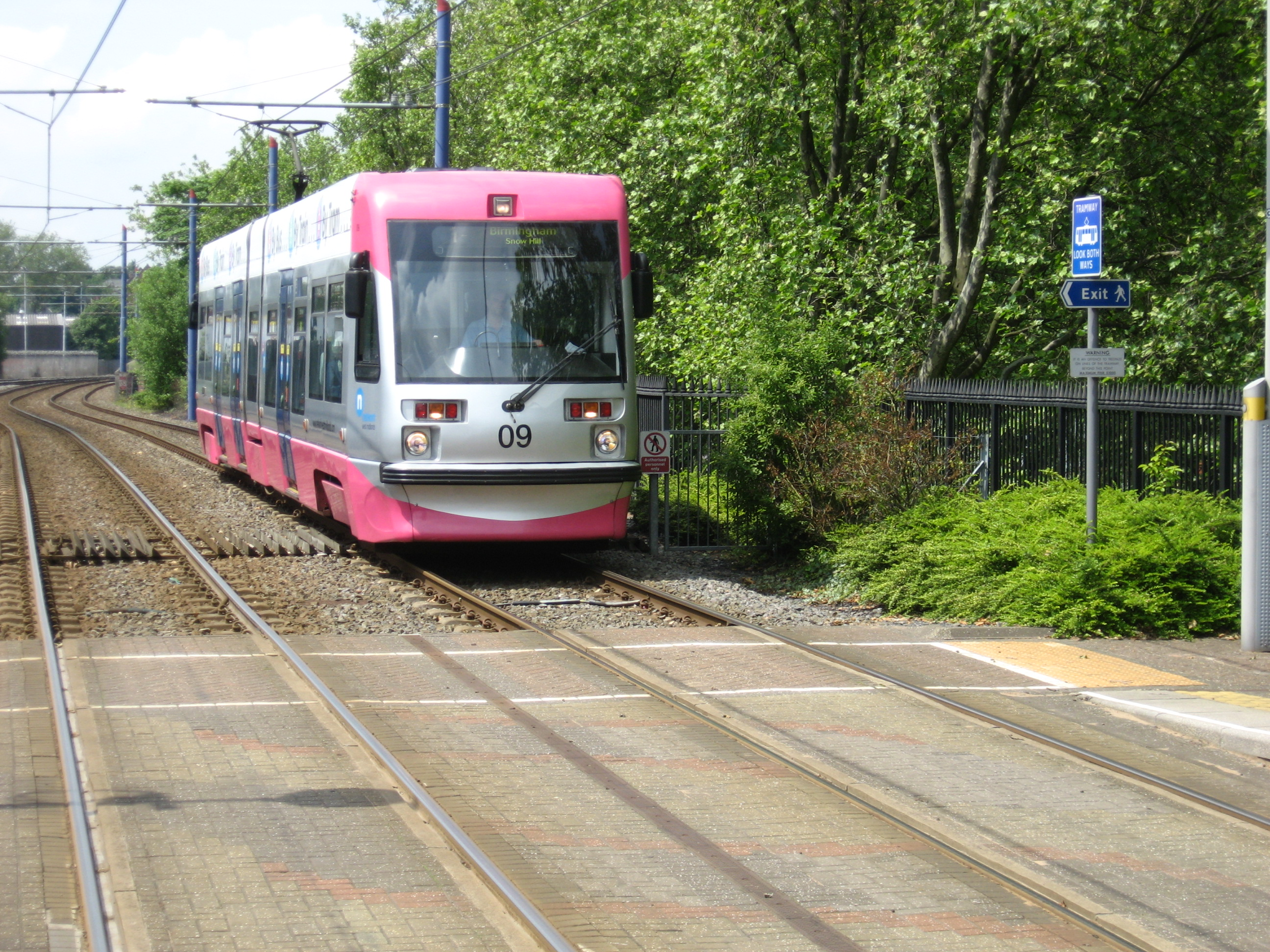
Tram 09 in silver and magenta livery in 2008

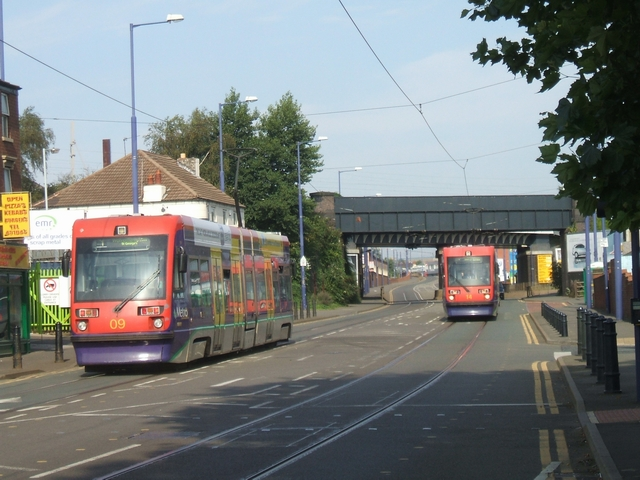
Trams 09 and 14 on the street running section in Wolverhampton in 2006

== Maintenance vehicles ==
National Express Midland Metro, the former operator of the tramway until 2018, acquired a number of vehicles for maintaining the line. These included a Unimog, and road-rail lifting platform. These vehicles have been transferred to the new operator, Transport for West Midlands, and are still in use.

== Bibliography ==
- Boynton, John (2001). Main Line to Metro: Train and tram on the Great Western route: Birmingham Snow Hill – Wolverhampton. Kidderminster: Mid England Books. ISBN 978-0-9522248-9-1.
