= Coventry Corporation Tramways =

Tramway operator in England

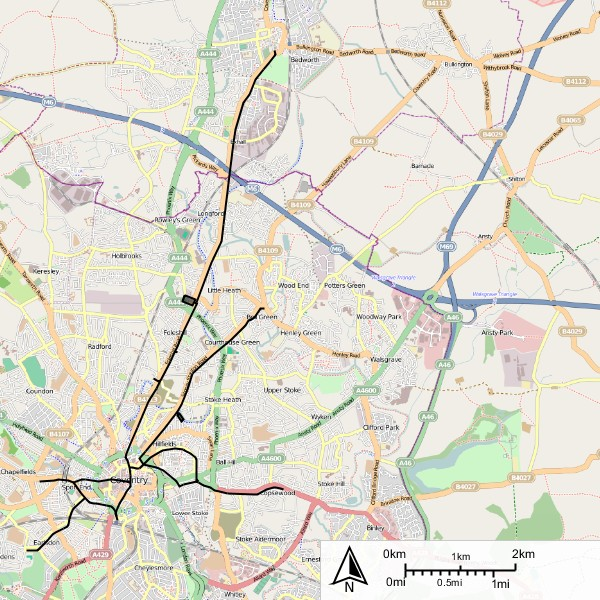
- Map of Coventry Corporation Tramways

Operation
- Locale: Coventry
- Open: 1 January 1912
- Close: 30 December 1940
- Status: Closed

Infrastructure
- Track gauge: 3 ft 6 in (1,067 mm)
- Propulsion system: Electric
- Depots: Priestley's Bridge and Foleshill

Statistics
- Route length: 13.33 miles (21.45 km)
Coventry and District Tramways Company era: 1884–1893
- Track gauge: 3 ft 6 in (1,067 mm)
- Propulsion system: Steam
Coventry Electric Tramways era: 1895–1912
- Track gauge: 3 ft 6 in (1,067 mm)
- Propulsion system: Electric
Coventry Corporation Tramways era: 1912–1940
- Track gauge: 1,435 mm (4 ft 8 1/2 in) standard gauge
- Propulsion system: Electric

Coventry Corporation Tramways operated a tramway service in Coventry, England, between 1912 and 1940.

== History ==
=== Coventry and District Tramways Company ===
Coventry and District Tramways Act 1880
- Act of Parliament
- Parliament of the United Kingdom
- Long title: An Act to authorise the construction of Tramways in and near to the towns of Coventry and Bedworth, and from Coventry to Bedworth, in the county of Warwick; and for other purposes.
- Citation: 43 & 44 Vict. c. clxxxv

Dates
- Royal assent: 26 August 1880

Other legislation
- Repealed by: West Midlands County Council Act 1980

Status: Repealed

Text of statute as originally enacted

Coventry and District Tramways Act 1882
- Act of Parliament
- Parliament of the United Kingdom
- Long title: An Act for empowering the Coventry and District Tramways Company to construct an additional Tramway in the city of Coventry and to deviate in constructing a part of their authorised Tramways to extend the time for constructing their undertaking; and for other purposes.
- Citation: 45 & 46 Vict. c. cxx

Dates
- Royal assent: 12 July 1882

Other legislation
- Repealed by: West Midlands County Council Act 1980

Status: Repealed

Text of statute as originally enacted

Coventry and District Tramways Act 1883
- Act of Parliament
- Parliament of the United Kingdom
- Long title: An Act to extend the time for constructing the Coventry and District Tramways and to empower the Coventry and District Tramways Company to raise additional Capital.
- Citation: 46 & 47 Vict. c. cxl

Dates
- Royal assent: 2 August 1883

Other legislation
- Repealed by: West Midlands County Council Act 1980

Status: Repealed

Coventry and District Tramways Act 1884
- Act of Parliament
- Parliament of the United Kingdom
- Long title: An Act to empower the Coventry and District Tramways Company to abandon the construction of one of their authorised Tramways; to extend the time for constructing the remainder of their authorised works, and for other purposes.
- Citation: 47 & 48 Vict. c. ccxx

Dates
- Royal assent: 7 August 1884

Other legislation
- Repealed by: West Midlands County Council Act 1980

Status: Repealed

Text of statute as originally enacted

Coventry and District Tramways Act 1887
- Act of Parliament
- Parliament of the United Kingdom
- Long title: An Act for authorising the release of the balance of the deposit fund remaining deposited as security for the completion of certain of the tramways authorised by the Coventry and District Tramways Act 1880.
- Citation: 50 & 51 Vict. c. lxxxvi

Dates
- Royal assent: 5 July 1887

Other legislation
- Repealed by: West Midlands County Council Act 1980

Status: Repealed

Text of statute as originally enacted

The Coventry and District Tramways Company successfully promoted a bill in 1881 to construct tramways between Coventry station and Bedworth. A proposed extension to Nuneaton was withdrawn owing to opposition. The track was laid in 1883 and initial steam powered services started in 1884. Trial trips by the steam tram were run in August 1884 from the depot at Foleshill to the City Centre, and then to Bedworth. The tramway opened soon afterwards but as anticipated by the inspector, there was difficulty in turning the sharp corner at the top of Bishop Street where the lines became double. On Monday 22 September 1884 an engine and car running up Bishop Street became locked in the points and it took repeated attempts to get the engine round the curve. Two days later a more concerning incident occurred when an engine left the rails at the same point. The tramway was closed for a few days for alterations to the track.

The steam trams seem never to have been very successful, frequently de-railing and experiencing difficulty in ascending the Bishop Street gradient. The service headway was one hour. Steam traction ceased in 1893, after which there was no tramway service until December 1895.

==== Fleet ====
- 1-2 Beyer Peacock Wilkinson Patent engines 1884
- 3-4 Thomas Green & Son Wilkinson Patent engines 1884
- 5-6 Falcon Engine & Car Works Scott Russell engines 1885
- 7 Falcon Engine & Car Works Scott Russell engine 1887 (second-hand - built for the South Staffordshire and Birmingham District Steam Tramways Company in 1885)
- Six trailer cars built by the Falcon Engine & Car Works in 1884 and 1885

=== Coventry Electric Tramways Company ===
Coventry Electric Tramways Act 1897
- Act of Parliament
- Parliament of the United Kingdom
- Long title: An Act to incorporate the Coventry Electric Tramways Company and to empower that Company to make and maintain Tramways and for other purposes.
- Citation: 60 & 61 Vict. c. ccxlvi

Dates
- Royal assent: 6 August 1897

Other legislation
- Repealed by: West Midlands County Council Act 1980

Status: Repealed

Coventry Electric Tramways Act 1903
- Act of Parliament
- Parliament of the United Kingdom
- Long title: An Act to authorise the Coventry Electric Tramways Company to construct additional tramways and for other purposes.
- Citation: 3 Edw. 7. c. cclix

Dates
- Royal assent: 14 August 1903

Text of statute as originally enacted

The steam tramway service was superseded by the Coventry Electric Tramways Company Ltd, which started operations in 1895. This company was a subsidiary of the New General Traction Company. The contractors for the electrification were the General Traction Company of Westminster, and the work was carried out under the supervision of Graff Baker and Winslow. Much of the equipment was supplied by the Westinghouse Company, and the Peckham cantilever trucks for the tramcars were also American.

Coventry was the first tramway in Britain to have side poles with span wires to carry the overhead electrification.

The first electric tram ran to Foleshill Depot (grid reference SP 34481 82294) on 5 December 1895 and the service was extended to Bedworth one week later.

A new depot was opened at Priestley's Bridge (grid reference SP 34277 80197) during 1899. On 6 March 1900 a tramway postal service was inaugurated, which continued until the end of tramway operation 40 years later. In latter days the postal car left Bedworth at 8.50pm, showing 'Postal Car' in red letters on the route indicator. The letter-box was fixed to the outside of the rear dash.

In 1896 the company made a profit of £3,360 (equivalent to £386,472 in 2025). By 1911 the profit had reached £12,599, (equivalent to £1,283,107 in 2025). the highest in the company history.

On Sunday 15 December 1907, car 9 overturned on turning the corner into Lower Ford Street after descending Far Gosford Street.

This company was taken over by the Coventry Corporation in 1912 at a cost of £202,132 (equivalent of £19,961,725 in 2025).

For the history of the Corporation's bus operations in the city, see Coventry Corporation Transport.

==== Fleet ====
- 1-8 Falcon Engine & Car Works, 1895 (5-8 used the trailer cars from the steam tramway as bodies)
- 9-10 Falcon Engine & Car Works, 1896 (used the trailer cars from the steam tramway as bodies)
- 11-18 Falcon Engine & Car Works 1897-8
- 19-30 Dick, Kerr & Co. 1905
- 31-36 Milnes Voss 1907
- 37-41 Brush 1910
- 42 Built by the company 1911

==== Generation station ====
The power house in 1895 was built at Foleshill Depot with two Browett, Lindley & Co horizontal engines, running at 240 r.p.m, driving at 650 r.p.m, 4 pole 100 kW generators by means of belts. In 1899 a new power house was built at Priestley's Bridge. This took in the engines from the Foleshill Depot, and two new direct coupled 250 r.p.m sets with Browett, Lindley & Co engines and 100 kW, 6 pole generators. These remained until January 1930 after which power was obtained from the Coventry Corporation Electricity Supply department and converted by two 500 kW Bruce Peebles rotary converters, installed in 1914, and a 1,000 kW Brush motor–generator installed in 1930.

=== Coventry Corporation Tramways ===
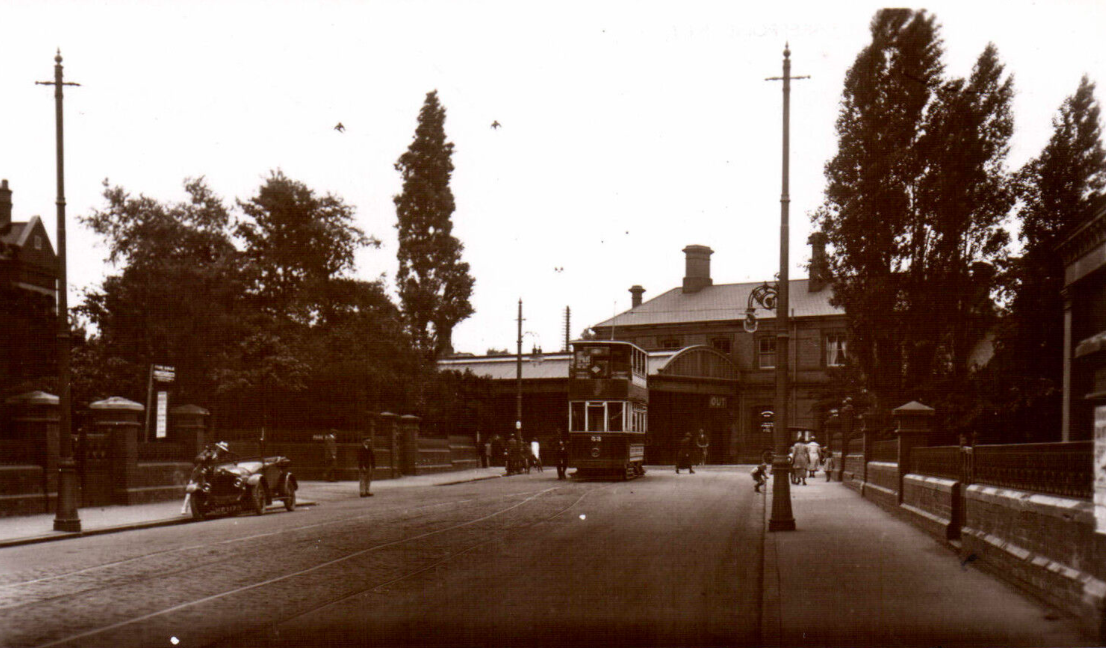
A tramcar on Eaton Road outside Coventry railway station ca. 1925

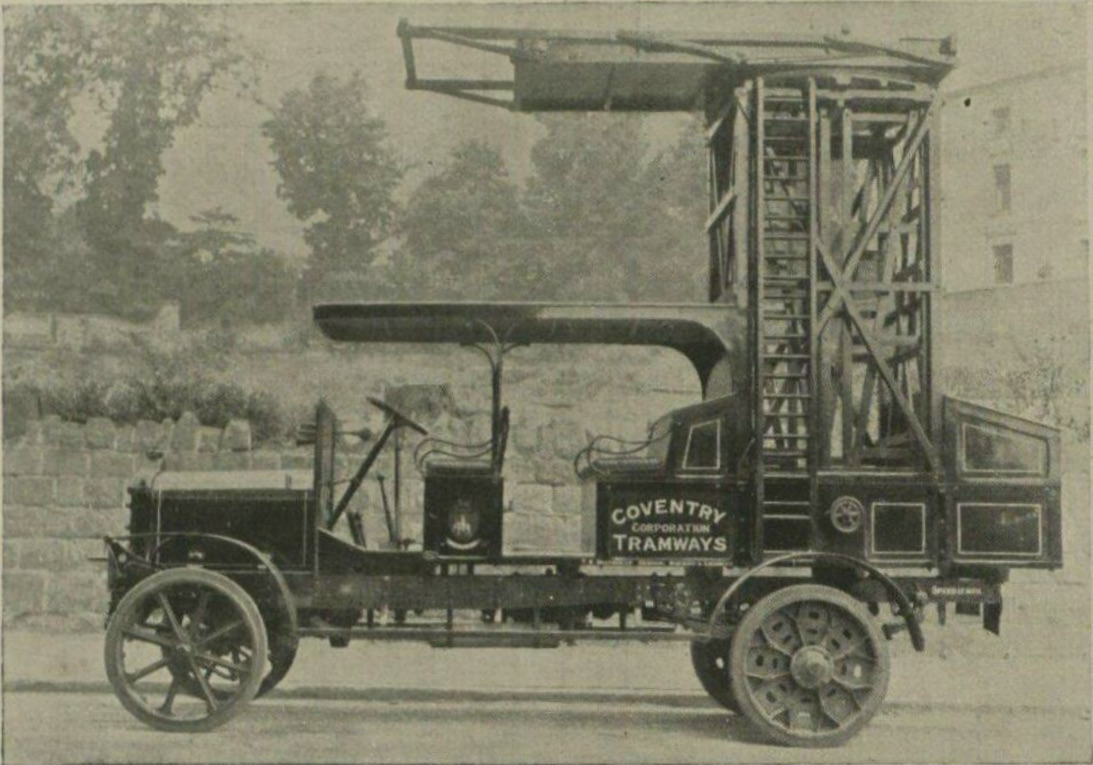
A tower wagon built by Daimler in 1919 for Coventry Corporation Tramways

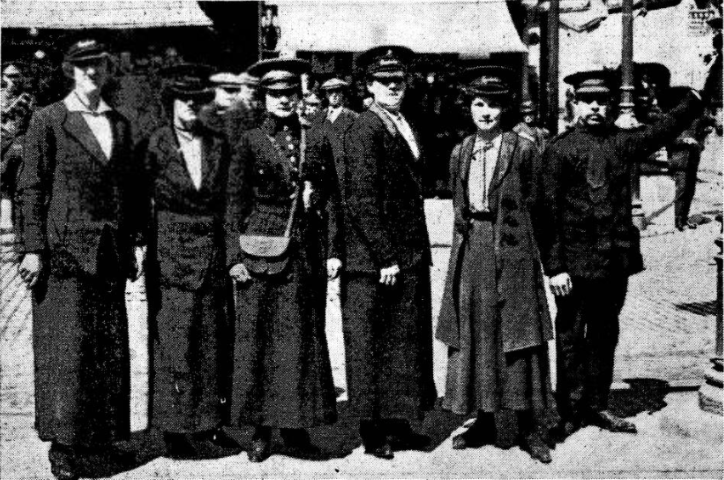
From the Coventry Herald 11 June 1915. Caption reads: Five of the newly-appointed lady tram conductresses in Coventry are photographed above. The lady in the centre of the group wears the full official uniform with which all the new workers are being supplied; a neat blue serge costume with white metal Corporation buttons and a grey straw military cap. The object of appointing women is of course to release male tram conductors of military age who wish to enlist. Occupied at present in learning new duties, the ladies are displaying marked intelligence, and it is believed they will make smart and efficient conductresses.

Coventry Corporation purchased the entire undertaking on 1 January 1912 for £220,638 9s 0d, met by a 30-year loan. This included 10.5 miles of single track, 2.6 miles of double track, 41 tramcars, with another in construction, the depot at Foleshill Road and the depot, boiler house and power station at Priestley's Bridge on Stoney Stanton Road.

In 1912 the corporation ordered ten new vehicles from Brush Electrical Machines of Loughborough. These were delivered in phases between 1913 and 1914. A further vehicle was delivered in 1916.

In the first fifteen months of corporation ownership it was reported that the tramways had made a net profit of £1,443, and a balance (after allowing for amounts appropriated for new plant) of £185.

In May 1915 the Coventry Tramways Committee approved a trial of employing women as conductors in view of the demand of the war for more men.

In 1918 there were two serious accidents. On 19 May, car no. 20 overturned at Longford. Over 20 passengers were injured. On 16 October two trams collided on White Street, which resulted in the death of a passenger, Frederick William Pinfold, who hit the glass door panel of one of the tramcars and sustained fatal injuries. Alfred Walter Freeman, aged 44, the tram driver, was charged with manslaughter.

The fleet was expanded further after the First World War with new vehicles arriving in 1921, 1925, 1929 and 1931, which took the total fleet size to 73.

Services developed such that by 1926 there were three full-length cross-city tram routes with seven short workings.

A new tram loop was opened in 1926 from Greyfriars Green along Queens Road to Albany Road, joining the existing Earlsdon route. Four years later, the last extension was opened from Bull's Head Lane along Binley Road to Uxbridge Avenue, for the new General Electric Company plc telephone works. In 1931 the track in Burgess was doubled which reduced delays in the central area.

The Allesley Road route was abandoned on 5 March 1932, and the Forst Street route to Gosford Green on 8 March 1936. The Earlsdon route was withdrawn on 11 April 1937 and railway station route on 18 July 1937. By 1938 the tram services were confined to the Bell Green and Bedworth tram routes. The Stoke via Payne's Lane route was closed on 12 August 1939, but during 1940 the track was repaired with rails from the abandoned Allesley Road route and service recommenced on 18 August 1940.

==== Fleet ====
Top covered cars, vestibuled lower deck, open balconies on Peckham Trucks

- 43-45 Brush 1913
- 46-53 Brush 1913-1915
- 54-58 Brush 1921
- 59-63 Brush 1925
- 64-68 Brush 1928
- 69-73 Brush 1931

==== Livery ====
The livery of the cars was firstly chocolate and cream, with cream rocker panels. "Coventry Corporation Tramways" was painted in gilt letters on the rocker panels. After 1933, maroon replaced chocolate, and "City of Coventry" was painted on the rocker panels which was finally replaced by "Coventry Transport". Car 52 appeared in 1939 in a livery which was entirely cream except the window frames, which were maroon.

== Closure ==
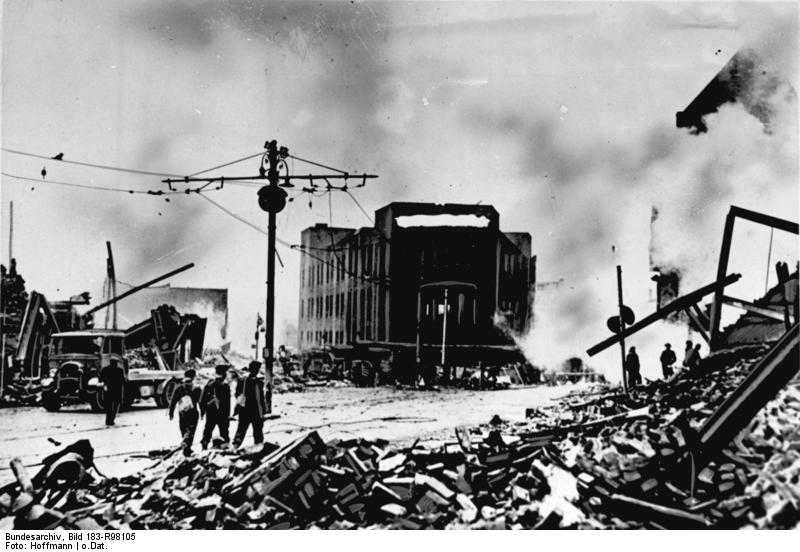
German photograph of the destruction caused in the Coventry Blitz

The first air raid to affect tram services occurred on 12 October 1940, when several bombs, including one at the top of Bishop Street, caused the Bedworth service to be cut back from Broadgate to Eagle Street. Two days later a bomb just beyond Foleshill Depot caused the Bedworth service to be curtailed at that point. On 24 October, the service was restored between Broadgate and Foleshill Depot.

The Bell Green route operated in two sections on either side of the Prince of Wales cinema, Paradise, as the result of the raid on 12 October 1940. There were sufficient cars isolated on the outer end of the route to operate the service on the Bell Green side of the crater. The through service was restored on 14 October but on 23 October the route began to operate in three sections as a result of further damage. By 28 October repairs had been made to allow the service to operate in two sections with a break at Peel Street.

This break was repaired and through service was about to be restored when the heavy raid of 14 November 1940 brought all services to an end. There were eleven rail fractures, 4.5 miles of cable wire brought down along with 38 poles. Six buses were totally wrecked, thirteen required almost complete rebuilding, and 181 which had suffered as a result of the night of 14-15 November. The damage caused by heavy bombing during the Coventry Blitz was too great to be repaired. The council decided in December 1940 to abandon the system. The remaining system was abandoned in February 1941.

== Reintroduction ==
A new light rail system for Coventry known as Coventry Very Light Rail is planned with the first line, originally planned to be operational by 2024. Now set back to at least 2026.
