= New General Traction Company =

Former British holding company

The New General Traction Company Ltd was registered on 24 March 1896 as an investment company with a focus on tramways and railways.

New General Traction Company was based at 20 Bishopsgate Street Within, London. The officers of the company were:

- Chairman, Baron Emile Beaumont d'Erlanger
- Managing Director, E. A. Hopkins
- Secretary, J. O. Mills
- Chief Engineer, Isaac Everson Winslow

This company held shares in several tramway companies:

- Coventry Electric Tramways Company – 5 December 1895 to 1 January 1912 (sold to Coventry Corporation Tramways)
- Douglas Southern Electric Tramway 7 August 1896 - 13 April 1926
- Norwich Electric Tramways 30 July 1900 – December 1933 (sold to Eastern Counties Omnibus Company)

== General Consolidated Investment Trust ==
In 1928 the New General Traction Company reduced its capital and changed name to the General Consolidated Investment Trust Ltd. Sometime after 1970 it became General Consolidated Investment Trust Plc, and company survived until 31 December 1997 when it was wound up in Members voluntary liquidation.
