= John Stanley Webb =

- Born: 11 January 1920; Walsall, Staffordshire
- Died: 22 January 2002 (aged 82); Walsall, West Midlands
- Occupations: Managing Director; Public transport historian

John Stanley Webb (11 January 1920 – 22 January 2002) was an English transport historian.

Born in Walsall, Staffordshire, Webb developed an interest in trains as a child; he traveled by rail to school. He wrote many books on British and other countries trams and tramway systems, while working for his family's firm, James Webb and Sons, of Bloxwich, which he joined in 1935 and from which he retired as Managing Director in 1986.

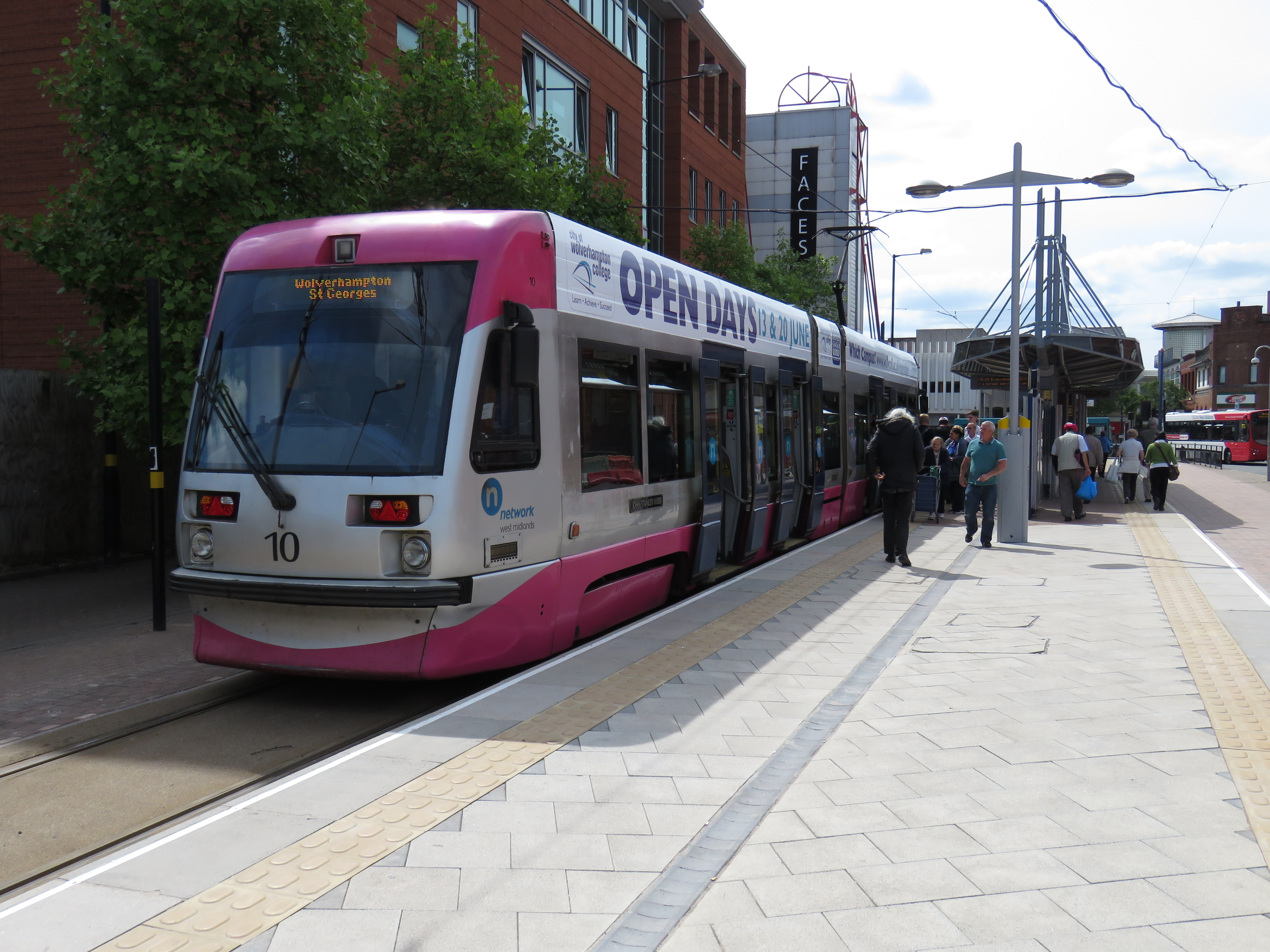
Midland Metro tram 10, "John Stanley Webb" (note nameplate beneath first passenger window)

Midland Metro named an AnsaldoBreda T-69 tram in his honour in a ceremony at Birmingham Snow Hill station on 17 July 2004. It has since been withdrawn from service, along with the rest of its class, and is stored unused.

== Bibliography ==
- ——. A History of the Black Country Tramways.
