= Jim Eames =

Honorary Alderman James Eames MBE
- Born: Eric James Eames; 11 April 1917
- Died: 10 April 2010 (aged 92)
- Other name: Jim
- Known for: Lord Mayor of Birmingham

Eric James Eames, MBE (11 April 1917 – 10 April 2010) was Lord Mayor of Birmingham for the year 1974–1975. He was also an Honorary Alderman and a magistrate.

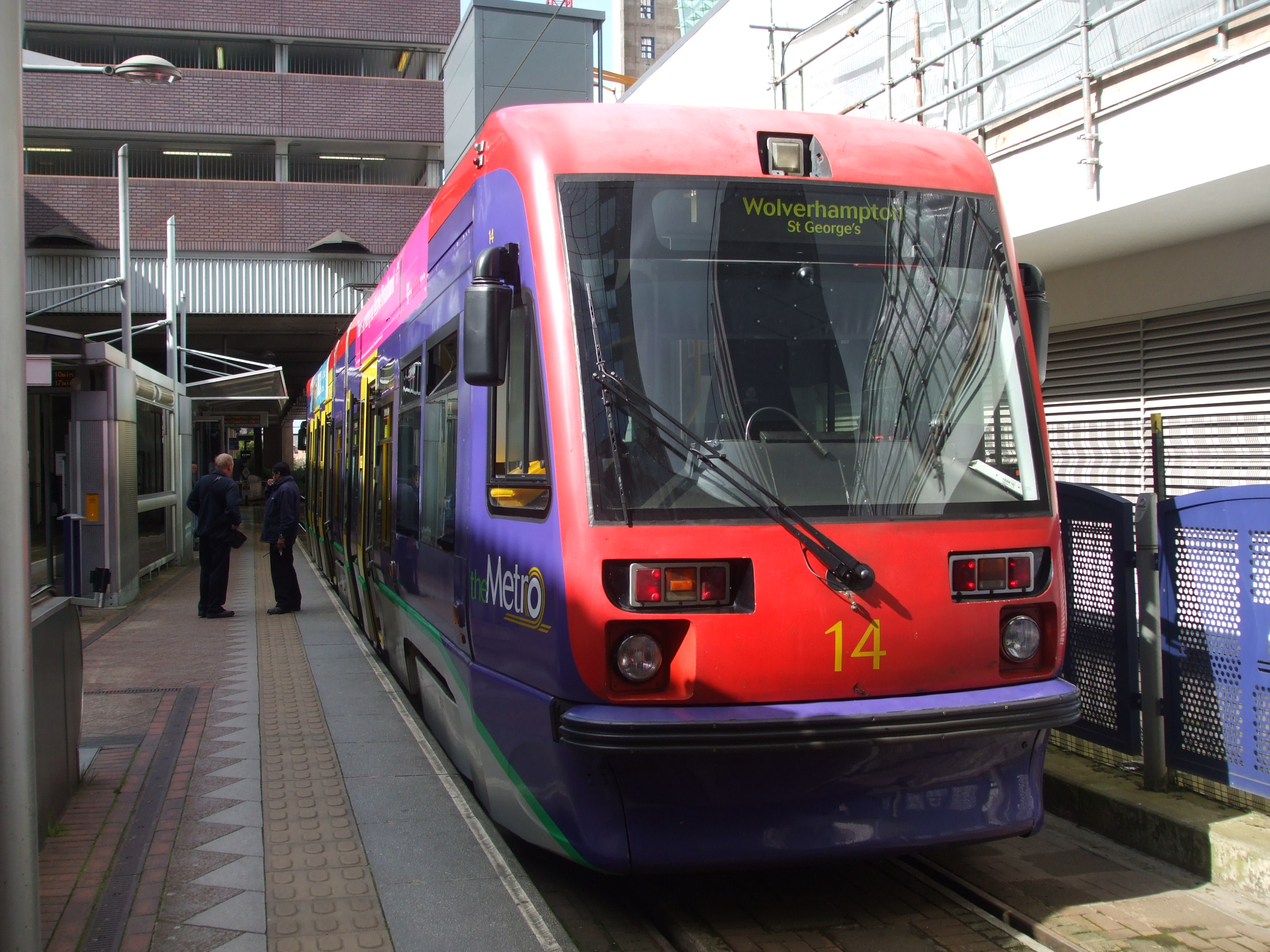
Midland Metro AnsaldoBreda T-69 tram 14 at Birmingham Snow Hill

A former steam engine driver, Eames represented the city's Small Heath ward on Birmingham City Council from 1949 to 1992, without break. The Birmingham pub bombings of 1974 occurred while he was Lord Mayor and his 'calm leadership' in the aftermath was widely praised. He was made MBE for services to the community.

He was founder President of the Ackers Trust, a Birmingham charity which runs an outdoor activity centre.

He died the day before his 93rd birthday in 2010. Midland Metro named an AnsaldoBreda T-69 tram in his honour. It has since been withdrawn from service, along with the rest of its class, and scrapped.
