= Norwich Electric Tramways =

Electric Tramways in Norwich, England

Coordinates: 52.62694°N 1.29383°E

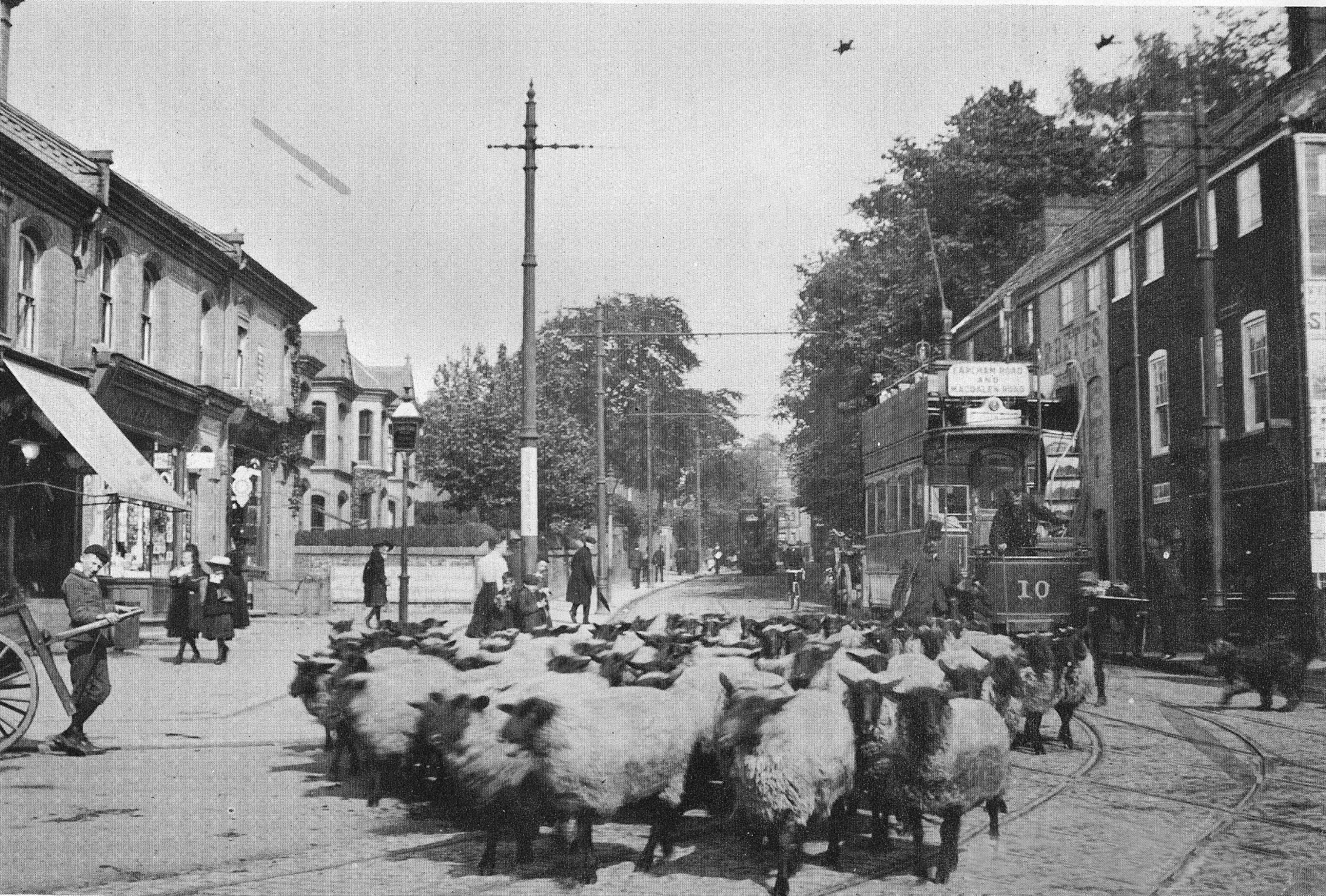
- Sheep along the Earlham Road, Norwich, showing a No 10 tram outside the Black Horse pub, about 1900.

Operation
- Locale: Norwich
- Open: 30 July 1900
- Close: 10 December 1935
- Status: Closed

Infrastructure
- Track gauge: 3 ft 6 in (1,067 mm)
- Propulsion system: Electric
- Depot: Silver Road

Statistics
- Route length: 15.16 miles (24.40 km)

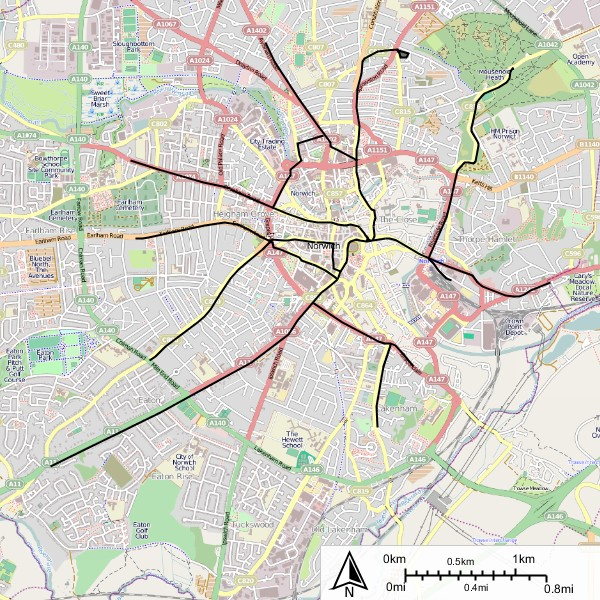
Map of the routes of Norwich Electric Tramways

Norwich Electric Tramways served the city of Norwich in Norfolk from 30 July 1900 until 10 December 1935.

== History ==
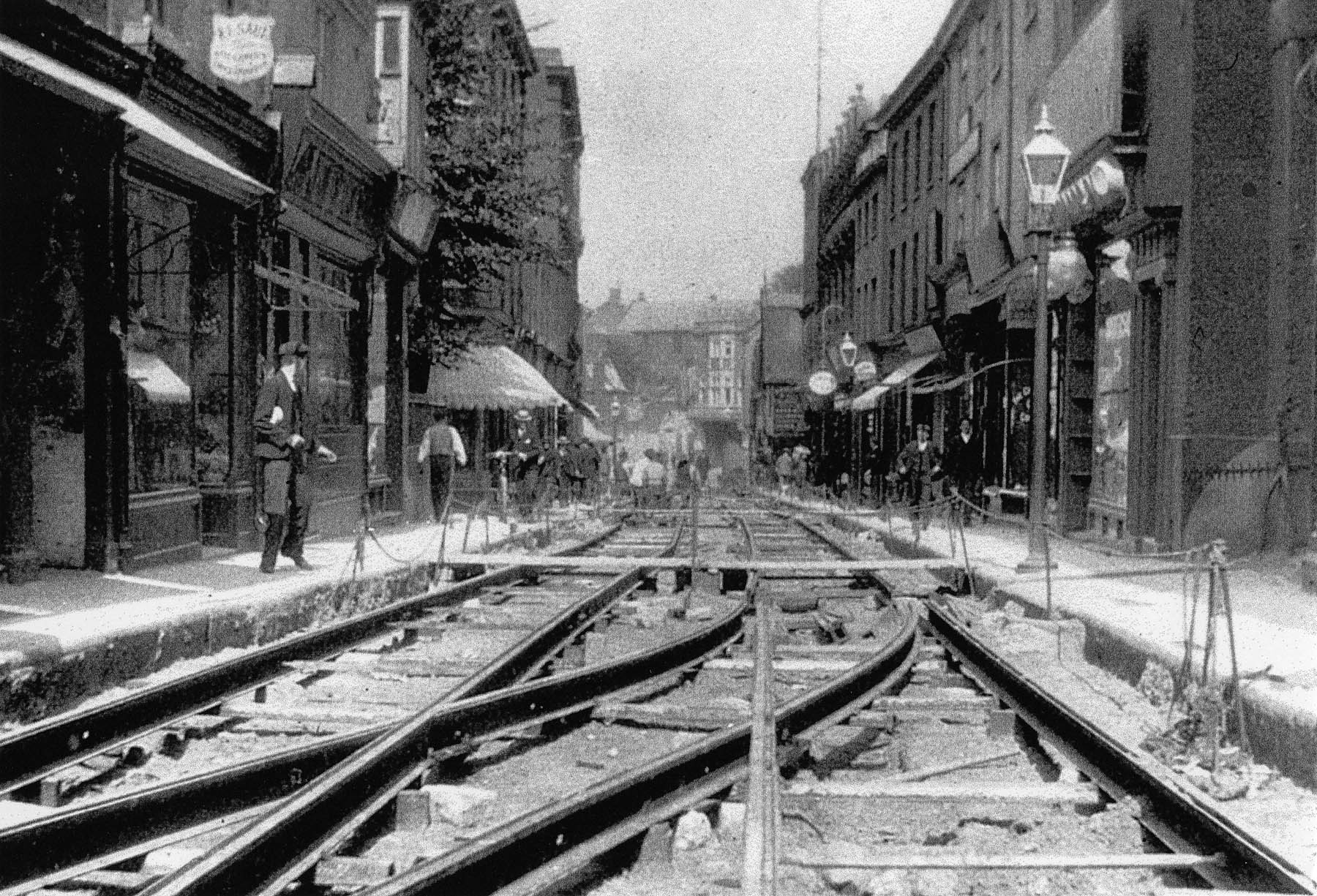
Laying tramlines in St Stephen's, Norwich.

The Norwich Electric Tramways company was a subsidiary of the New General Traction Company. Construction work started in June 1898 and first routes opened in July 1900. An electricity generating station was built on Duke Street to supply power for the scheme. The tram depot was on Silver Road. The network was essentially complete and fully operational by the end of 1901, but there were minor additions and changes in 1918 and 1919.

== Infrastructure ==
The network was radial, with routes based around the hub in Orford Place TG 23046 08327. From Orford Place the lines ran along:

- Haymarket, Gentleman's Walk, Market Place, St Giles Street, Earlham Road to a terminus at the entrance to Norwich cemetery TG 21266 08541
- Castle Meadow, Bank Plain, Redwell Street, St Andrews Street, Charing Cross, St Benedicts Street, Dereham Road to a terminus at the junction with Merton Road TG 21098 09234
- Castle Meadow, Bank Plain, Redwell Street, St Andrews Street, Charing Cross, St Benedicts Street, Barn Road, Norwich City railway station, Station Road, Oak Street, Sussex Street, St Augustine Street, Aylsham Road to a terminus at the junction with Berners Street TG 22267 10360
- Castle Meadow, Upper King Street, Tombland, Wensum Street, Fyebridge Street, Magdalen Street, Magdalen Road, Denmark Road to the depot in Silver Road at TG 23494 10308.
- Castle Meadow, Prince of Wales Road, Norwich Thorpe railway station, Riverside Road, Bishopbridge Road, Gurney Road (past Britannia Barracks) to a terminus on Mousehold Heath at TG 24531 10229. A later extension across Mousehold Heath to a munitions factory enabled a goods service between the factory and the exchange sidings at Norwich Thorpe station.
- Castle Meadow, Prince of Wales Road, Norwich railway station, Thorpe Road to a terminus at TG 24950 08303
- Red Lion Street, St Stephens Street, Norwich Victoria railway station, Queens Road, Bracondale to a terminus for Trowse railway station at TG 24223 07160
- Red Lion Street, St Stephens Street, Norwich Victoria railway station, Queens Road, City Road, Long John Hill to a terminus at TG 23450 06940
- Red Lion Street, St Stephens Street, Norwich Victoria railway station, St Stephens Road, Newmarket Road to a terminus at its junction with Unthank Road at TG 20496 06438
- Haymarket, Gentleman's Walk, Market Place, St Giles Street, Unthank Road to a terminus at its junction with Mile End Road at TG 21355 07428

There were also some lines that were abandoned prior to 1924:

- Chapel Field Road
- King Street
- Heigham Road

There were some lines used for access only:

- Chapel Field North, Theatre Street, Rampant Horse Street
- Magpie Road

== Tramcars ==
The fleet, in a livery of maroon and ivory, initially consisted of:

- 40 Brush open top double deck tramcars
- 10 open top double deck trailers

== Closure ==
In 1933 the Eastern Counties Omnibus Company bought the tramway system and began the process of shutting it down and replacing it with motor buses. The last tram route to close, in 1935, was Newmarket Road to Cavalry Barracks.

== See also ==
List of town tramway systems in the United Kingdom
