= National Express Midland Metro =

British tram operating company

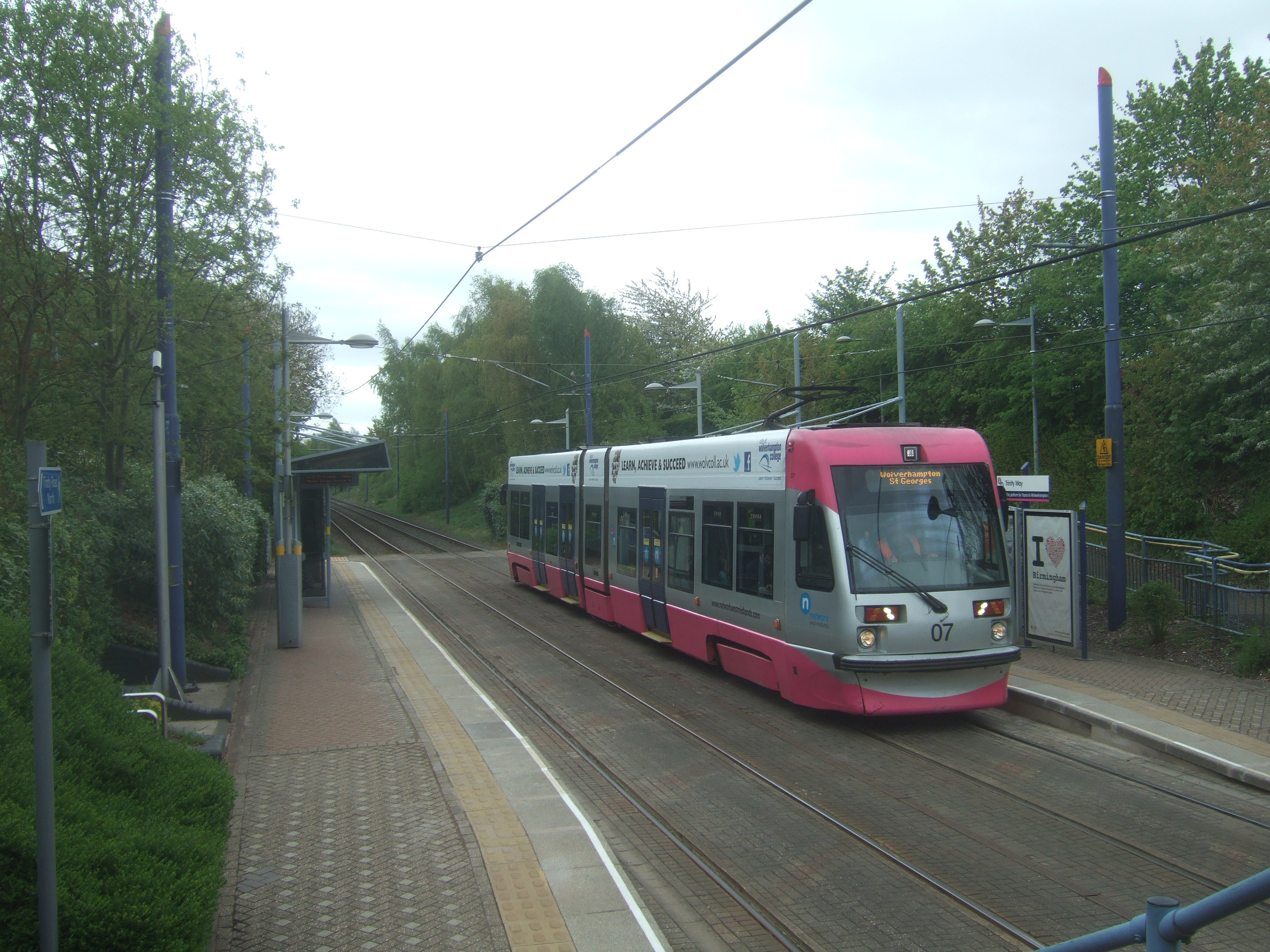
- AnsaldoBreda T-69 tram at Trinity Way in February 2006
- Parent: National Express Group
- Founded: 30 May 1999
- Ceased operation: 23 June 2018
- Headquarters: Wednesbury
- Locale: Birmingham; Sandwell; Wolverhampton
- Service area: West Midlands
- Service type: Tram
- Fleet: 21 CAF Urbos 3
- Daily ridership: 14,000
- Website: Express Midland Metro

National Express Midland Metro operated the Midland Metro tram system between Birmingham and Wolverhampton in England from May 1999 until June 2018. It was a subsidiary of National Express, who also owned the local bus company National Express West Midlands. The National Express Midland Metro brand name and logo were not carried on trams and on most publicity, just 'The Metro' branding with the exception of printed timetables.

== History ==
The Midland Metro was built and operated by the Altram consortium owned by Ansaldo, John Laing and National Express opening on 30 May 2005. In March 2006 National Express bought out its consortium partners. Midland Metro was specified and financed by the West Midlands Passenger Transport Executive. The operating company was previously named Travel Midland Metro in keeping with National Express' previous naming structure for subsidiary companies.

National Express operated the concession until 23 June 2018, when it was taken over by Transport for West Midlands and the tram system renamed to West Midlands Metro.

== Fleet ==
The original fleet consisted of 16 AnsaldoBreda T-69 trams. These were replaced by 21 CAF Urbos 3s in 2014/15. Originally trams were intended to carry an off-white with yellow, blue and green stripes livery, but instead carried a purple, yellow, red, green and grey livery. This was replaced by a pink and silver livery in 2007.
