= West Midlands Passenger Transport Executive =

Public transport body in West Midlands, UK

- Abbreviation: WMPTE
- Predecessor: Birmingham City Transport; Coventry Corporation Transport; Walsall Corporation Transport; West Bromwich Corporation Transport; Wolverhampton Corporation Transport
- Successor: Transport for West Midlands
- Formation: 1 October 1969
- Dissolved: 17 June 2016
- Type: Passenger transport executive
- Legal status: Dissolved
- Purpose: Public transport
- Headquarters: Birmingham, England
- Region served: West Midlands (county) parts of Staffordshire
- Parent organisation: 1969-1974: West Midlands PTA; 1974-1986: West Midlands Council; 1986-2009: West Midlands PTA; 2009-2016: West Midlands ITA

The West Midlands Passenger Transport Executive (WMPTE) was the public body responsible for public transport in the West Midlands metropolitan county in the United Kingdom from 1969 until 2016. The organisation operated under the name Centro from 1990, and was publicly branded as Network West Midlands from 2005.

Initially, WMPTE was also responsible for the operation of bus services within the West Midlands. However, following deregulation in 1986 it ceased operating services directly and assumed a purely coordinating role.

WMPTE was dissolved in 2016 following the establishment of the West Midlands Combined Authority and its transport arm, Transport for West Midlands (TfWM).

== Governance ==
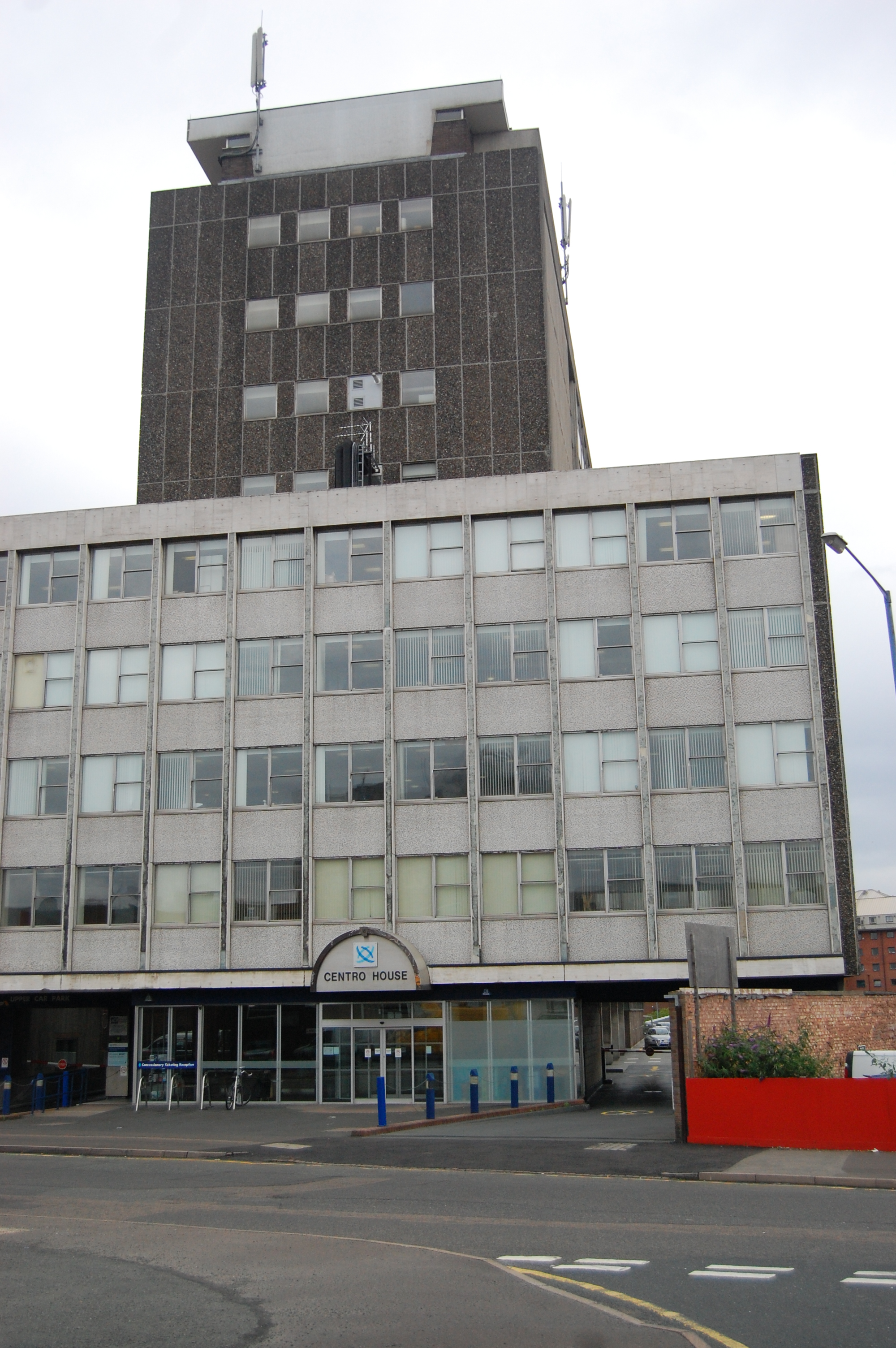
WMPTE's headquarters in Birmingham

When first established, WMPTE was governed by the West Midlands Passenger Transport Authority (WMPTA). Initially, this consisted of members from the local government authorities then existing within WMPTE's operating area. The Local Government Act 1972 led to the abolition of these local authorities and the creation of the West Midlands metropolitan county and its seven metropolitan boroughs (Birmingham, Coventry, Dudley, Sandwell, Solihull, Walsall, and Wolverhampton), which came into being on 1 April 1974. From that date, the original WMPTA was disbanded. In its place, the new West Midlands County Council (WMCC) became the PTA for the West Midlands.

However, this new arrangement ultimately proved to be short lived, as the Local Government Act 1985 abolished the metropolitan county councils, the WMCC among them, with effect from 1 April 1986. On that date, a new WMPTA was formed, comprising members from the West Midlands' seven metropolitan borough councils. The Local Transport Act 2008 subsequently saw the WMPTA reconstituted as the West Midlands Integrated Transport Authority (WMITA).

In its final form, the WMITA functioned as a committee formed of the leaders of the seven metropolitan boroughs, and a non-voting representatives from each of the region's three local enterprise partnerships, that set the strategic agenda for the WMPTE. These agenda were broken down into six groups, with a set of councillors responsible for each:

- Transport Delivery oversaw the work of all the other delivery committees.
- Policy Co-ordination and Development ensured the WMPTE's policies were effectively delivered.
- Finance, Delivery & Performance Monitoring managed the WMPTE's budget.
- Putting Passengers First ensured the WMPTE's policies met the needs of the public.
- Task & Finish ensured WMPTE's task and finish groups met their delivery timescales.
- Partner Engagement, Petitions & Appeals Sub-Committee – considered appeals against bus shelter placements and ensured the authority worked effectively with industry partners.

Public consultations were held to gather public views on proposed projects and policies. The authority was primarily funded by a council tax levy from the seven metropolitan boroughs, although some projects were funded by the Department for Transport and the European Union.

== Branding ==
In 1990, WMPTE adopted the corporate name of Centro. Local Class 150 and Class 323 trains were painted in a green Centro livery. Central Trains later applied an updated lime green livery to the Class 150 fleet. From 2007, some received a light blue and green livery when Network West Midlands was established. Following the franchise passing to London Midland, the introduction of Class 172 rolling stock, and the repainting of the 323s into London Midland livery, Centro livery disappeared from local trains.

The name Network West Midlands was used for a rebranding of existing bus and train services from 2005 onwards, based on the premise that survey information had indicated that more people would use public transport if a strong brand were identifiable. Promotion of the brand included television advertising, print media, and online media. All bus stops, Metro stops, and railway station signs were replaced with Network West Midlands signage.

VAG Rounded was originally used as the corporate typeface by Centro as part of the Network West Midlands initiative; later this was replaced by a custom typeface called Network.

Following creation of Transport for West Midlands, a new logo and signage has been introduced.

Original WMPTE logo
used 1969–1990

Centro logo
used 1990–2005

Network West Midlands
brand from 2005

== History ==
=== Creation ===
WMPTE was created by the Transport Act 1968 and came into being on 1 October 1969 to operate and coordinate public transport in the large West Midlands conurbation. At that time, the West Midlands Passenger Transport Area comprised the City of Birmingham, the County Boroughs of Dudley, Solihull, Walsall, Warley, West Bromwich, and Wolverhampton, and nearby parts of northern Worcestershire, northern Warwickshire, and southern Staffordshire.

=== Bus operations ===
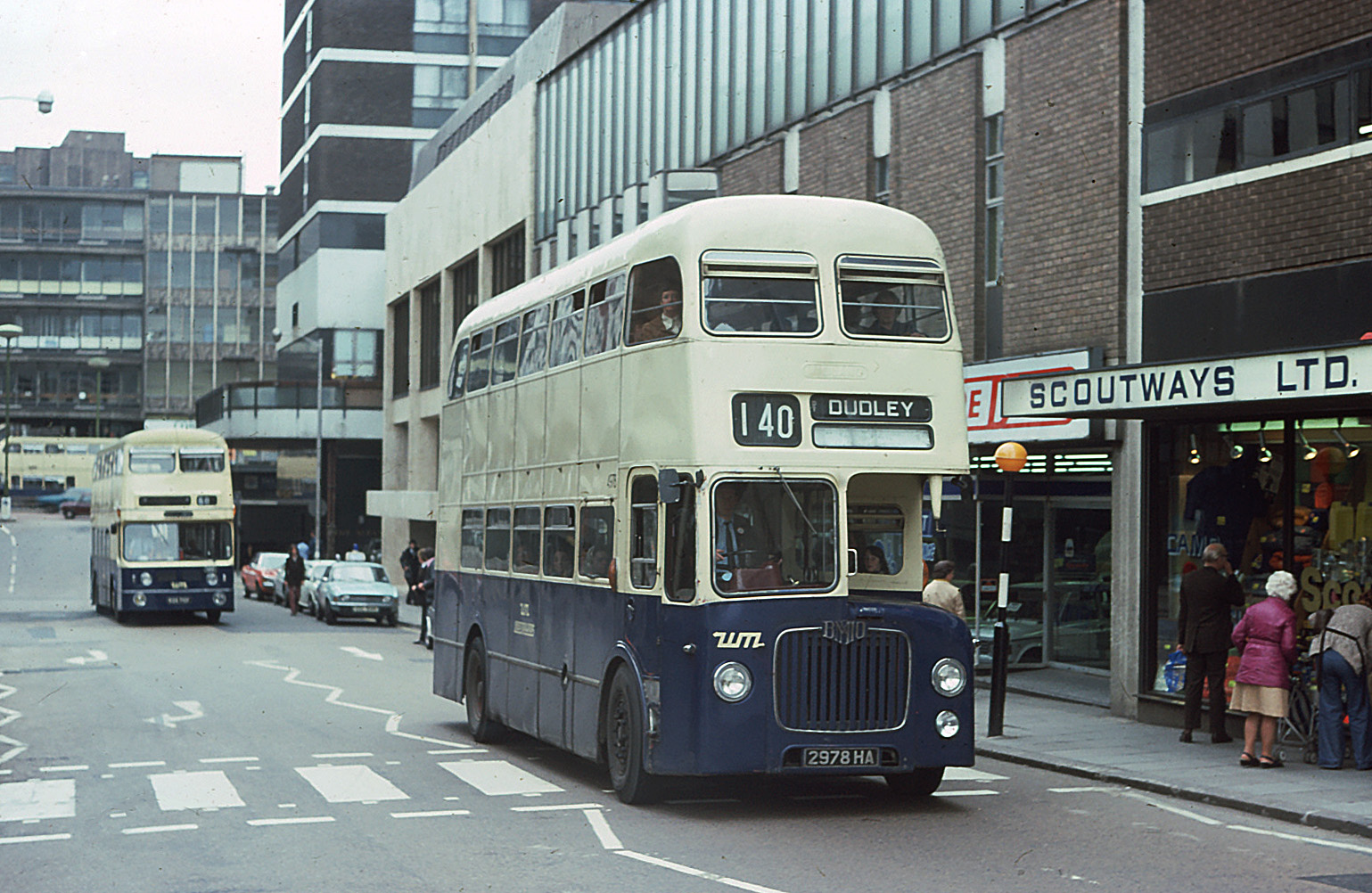
Buses in WMPTE livery, in 1975

On its formation in 1969 the WMPTE acquired the vehicles and other assets of the municipal bus fleets of Birmingham, Walsall, West Bromwich and Wolverhampton. The former Birmingham City Transport was by far the largest constituent part of the combined fleet, accounting for around two thirds of the new 2100-strong fleet and 8500 employees, and so a modified version of that operator's blue and cream livery was adopted by the WMPTE. The ex-Birmingham assets became 'South Division', with the others forming the Walsall-based 'North Division'. The buses subsequently became known as Wumpty buses by the public, in reference to the WMPTE initials. When the creation of the West Midlands County Council expanded the WMPTE's operating area into Coventry, WMPTE absorbed the vehicles and assets of that city's municipal transport undertaking, Coventry Transport, which became its 'East Division'.

Although it was tasked with planning and coordinating bus and rail transport in the Passenger Transport Area, the Executive's activities in its early years were largely confined to integrating the inherited municipal bus operations. Much of the Passenger Transport Area was not served by WMPTE buses, many bus services continued to be run by the Midland Red bus company. This was considered undesirable by WMPTE, so it entered into negotiations to partly buy them out. On 3 December 1973, there was a transfer of assets and services between the Midland Red and the Executive involving routes that operated wholly (or almost wholly) within the proposed West Midlands county. By April 1974, the WMPTE's fleet numbered around 2,600 vehicles.

=== Revised operating area ===
The Local Government Act 1972 led to the creation, on 1 April 1974, of the West Midlands metropolitan county. As a result, WMPTE's operating area was adjusted to match that of the new county, most notably adding Meriden and Coventry. While it continued to operate a handful of out-of-county services to nearby towns, original plans to include adjoining areas such as Bromsgrove and Redditch within WMPTE's operating area were dropped.

=== Railway services ===
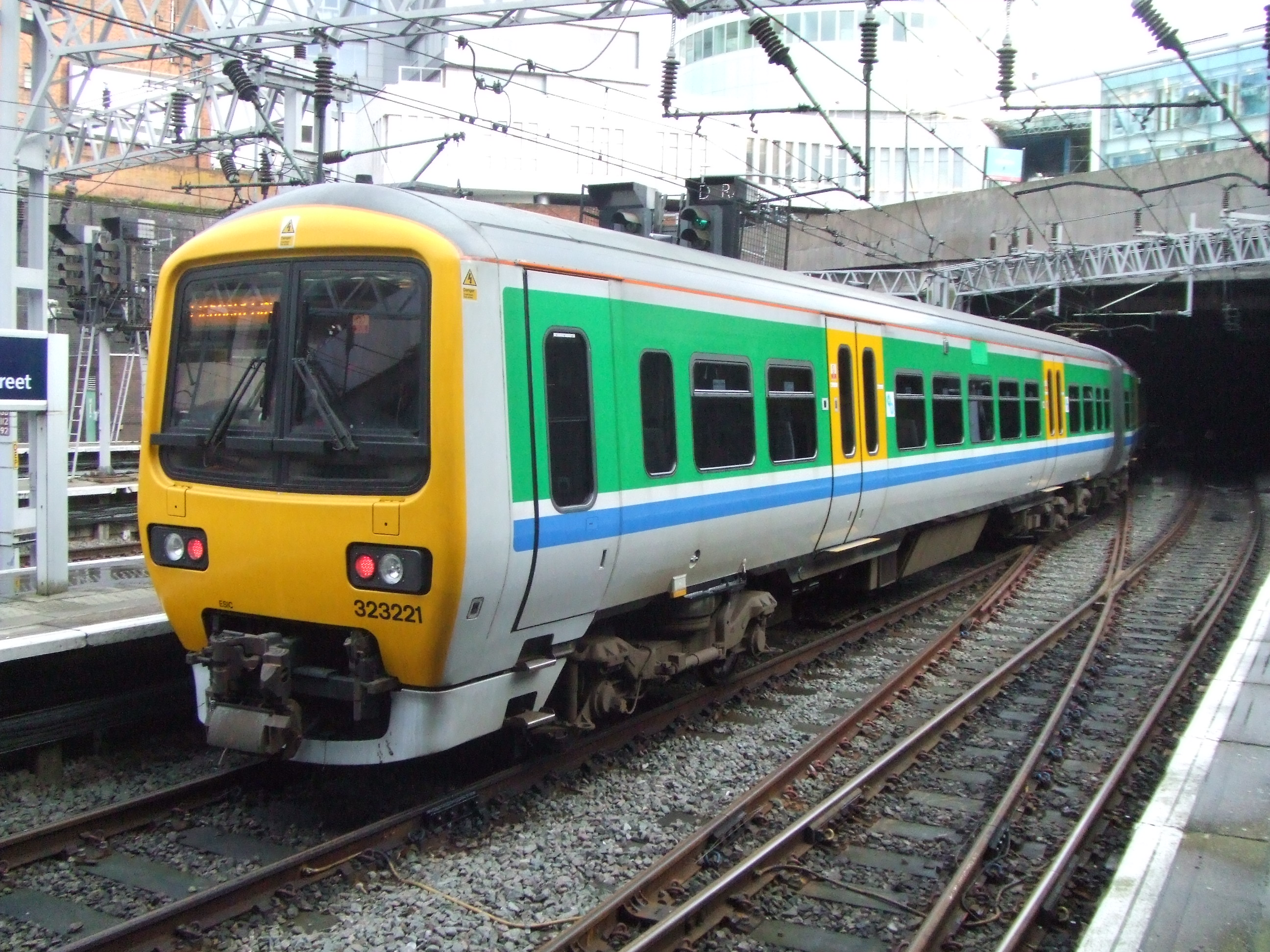
Class 323 in the original Centro livery at Birmingham New Street in January 2008

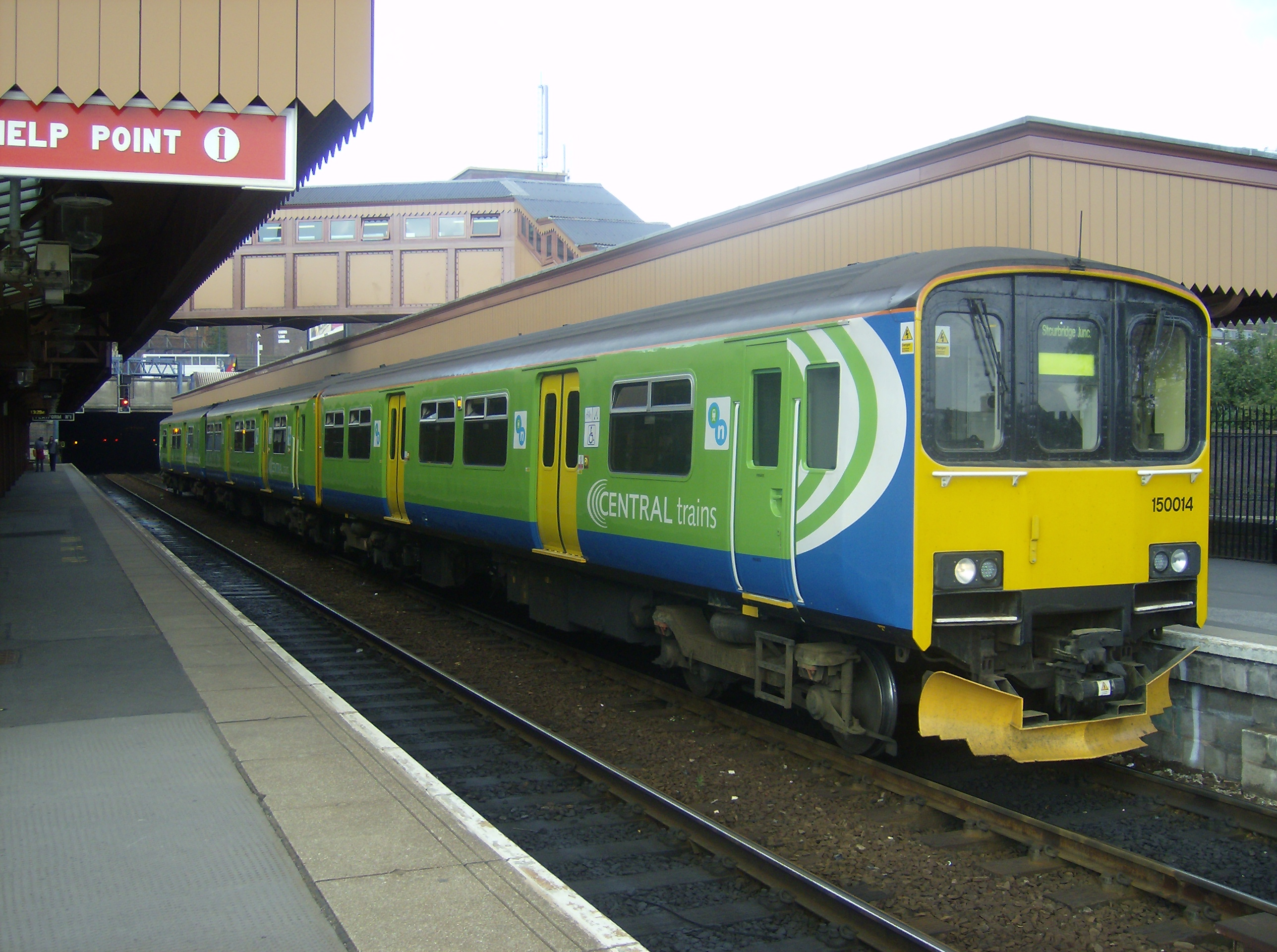
Class 150 in the later Centro livery at Birmingham Moor Street in September 2007

In 1973, WMPTE entered into an agreement with British Rail to take on responsibility for managing and developing local rail services within its area, and to the 'natural terminus' of each line. They became responsible for setting fares and service frequencies, and providing grants for local services, but the operation of the services continued to be in the hands of British Rail, later passing to Central Trains and then London Midland following privatisation. Rail services supported by the PTE carried WMPTE (and later Centro) livery.

From the mid-1970s onwards, WMPTE took on a more active role in the development of local railway services: Service frequencies were improved on many local lines: One of the first improvements made under WMPTE's auspices, was to the local services between Birmingham Moor Street, Dorridge and Shirley which were doubled in frequency to half-hourly in 1975. Efforts were also undertaken to create new services: The flagship Cross-City Line, implemented in 1978, which included new stations serving Birmingham University and Longbridge, plus the reopening of Five Ways station, was a joint BR/WMPTE project.

In the 1980s, WMPTE decided to reopen and restore rail services through Birmingham Snow Hill station, which had closed in 1972. The restoration process took place in two stages: The first stage, completed in 1987, saw the opening of new Snow Hill station for services to the south. The second stage, completed in 1995, saw the restoration of the rail link between Snow Hill and the line to Kidderminster and Worcester. In 1999 the former Snow Hill to Wolverhampton line, was reopened as part of the Midland Metro tram line.

Restoration of passenger services on the Chase Line between Walsall and Rugeley, between 1989 and 1998 was a joint project of WMPTE and Staffordshire County Council. Passenger services on the Walsall to Wolverhampton Line were also restored in 1998, although these were not a success, and were withdrawn in 2008 due to low patronage.

=== Bus deregulation ===
As a result of the Transport Act 1985, bus services were deregulated. This resulted in the transfer of the bus services to a separate legal entity, West Midlands Travel Ltd (WMT), which took over the bus assets and services of the WMPTE on 26 October 1986. WMT remained in public ownership under the West Midlands Passenger Transport Authority until 1991, when it was sold to its management and employees for £60 million. WMT was subsequently purchased by National Express in April 1995. However, WMT could have been purchased by Stagecoach instead if Brian Souter's £85 million was accepted. It was rejected on the grounds of the PTE being reluctant sellers and taking concern over the quality of bus services.

In August 2026, it was announced WMCA would buy back WMT from National Express (now owned by Mobico), in order to support the transition to a franchising system from October 2027.

=== Midland Metro ===
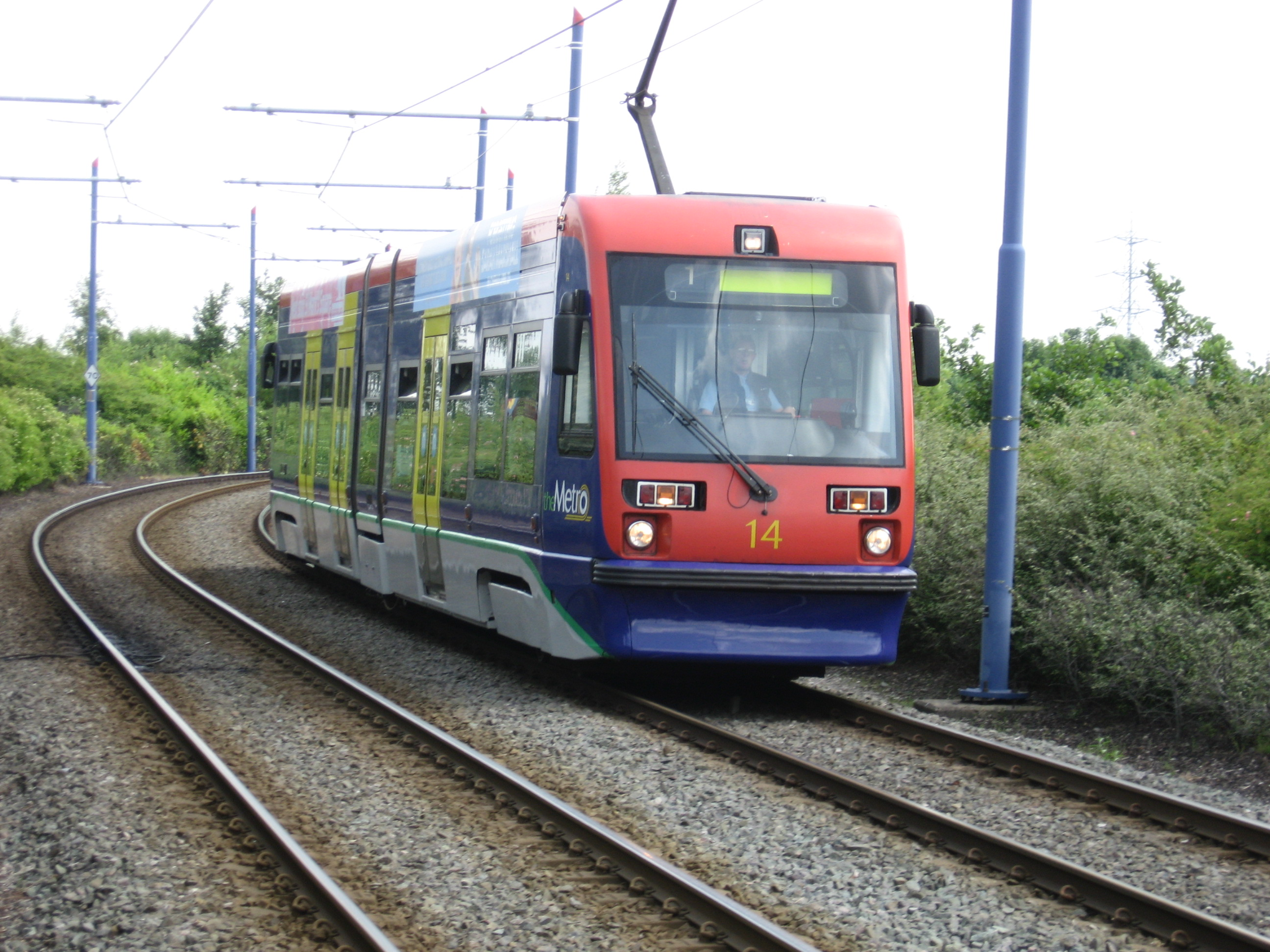
Midland Metro AnsaldoBreda T-69 in June 2008

The WMPTE was also responsible for the reintroduction of tram services to the West Midlands, with the development of the Midland Metro. Plans for a multi-line light rail system for the West Midlands were first drawn up in the early 1980s. However the first (and so far only) line of the Midland Metro was opened in 1999 between Birmingham Snow Hill and Wolverhampton. In 2016 the line was extended into the streets of the Birmingham city centre, from its original terminus at Birmingham Snow Hill to Birmingham New Street. In 2019, it was extended to Library with an extension to Edgbaston opened in 2021

=== Dissolution ===
Following the creation of the West Midlands Combined Authority and its transport arm, Transport for West Midlands (TfWM), the WMPTE and the WMITA were abolished on 16 June 2016, and their responsibilities, functions, assets, and staff were transferred to the Combined Authority. The WMPTE's Network West Midlands brand was initially retained by TfWM as the public-facing brand for public transport information in the region. However this has since been relaunched as West Midlands Network with a new hexagonal W M logo. This has been applied to most bus stops (on an ongoing roll-out) and timetables. Certain bus routes have been branded Network Bus with buses painted an identical shade of red, irrespective of operator and with tickets valid on either operator on the route. Similarly the enquiry office at Wolverhampton Interchange has received new signage West Midlands Network.

== Key projects ==
=== New Street railway station ===
Centro backed the Gateway Plus project to rejuvenate Birmingham New Street station.

=== High-speed rail ===
In August 2009, Centro backed construction of a new railway in the West Midlands region for use by High Speed 2 trains, which would allow existing lines to have "better and more frequent local services".

=== Midland Metro ===
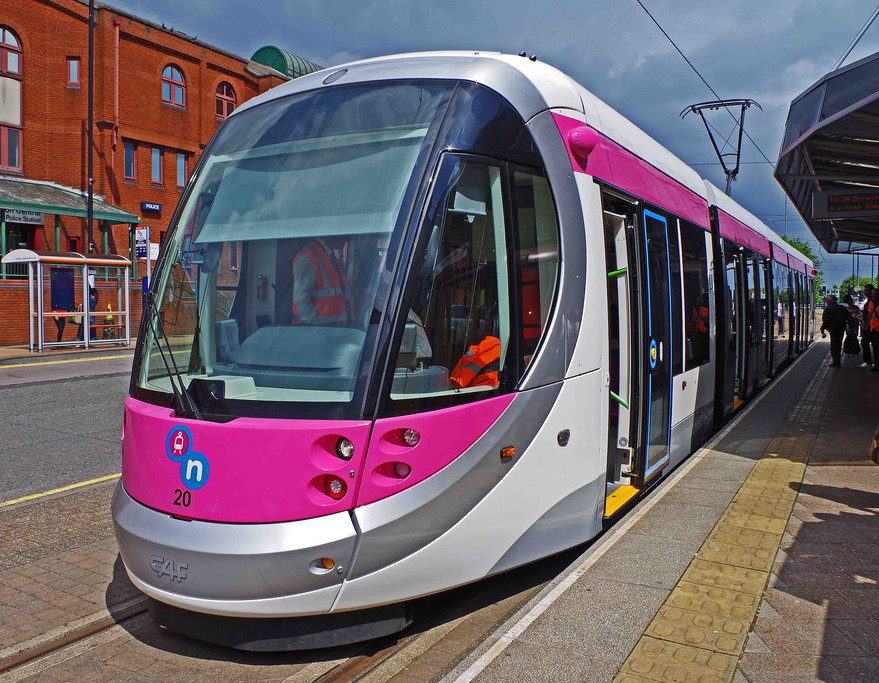
Midland Metro Urbos 3 tram in Wolverhampton in June 2014

The Midland Metro was owned by the WMPTE and run under concession by National Express Midland Metro. It opened in May 1999. An extension through the city centre of Birmingham opened in May 2016.

=== Bus rapid transit ===
Towards the very end of its existence, WMPTE developed plans for a new network of 'Sprint' services to be implemented by the incoming transport authority, TfWM.

=== Environmental initiatives ===
The WMPTE, Centro, was committed to sustainable forms of transport which benefited the environment and helped to reduce global warming, citing road congestion on the West Midlands' busy roads costs regional businesses more than £2.3 billion a year. Centro had a comprehensive green charter and action plan for the environment and was a full signatory of the UITP Charter for Sustainable Development.

In addition, the award winning Letzgogreen (sic) website educated school pupils and teachers about the benefits of sustainable transport.

== Ticketing ==
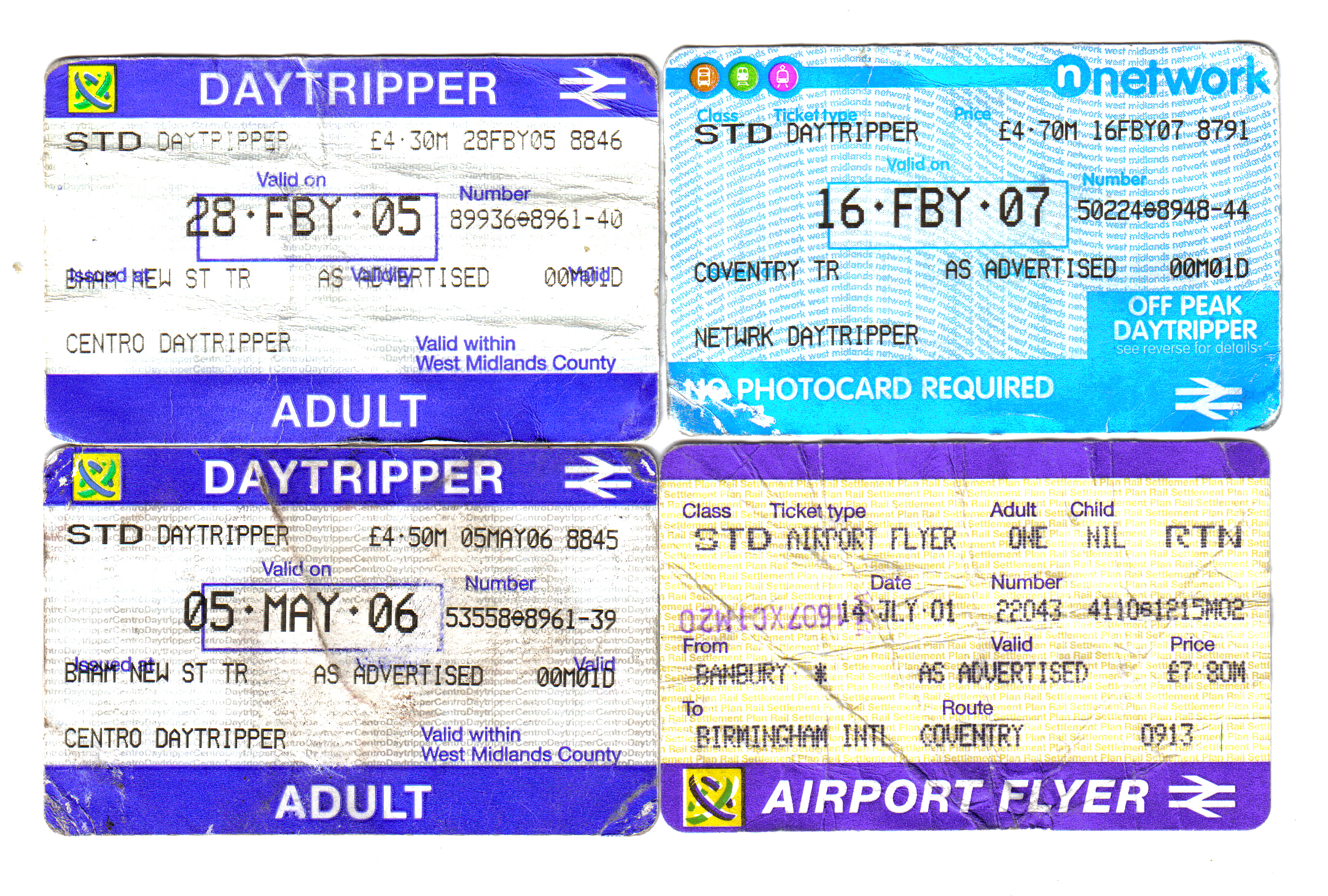
2005 and 2006 Centro Daytripper tickets, a 2001 Centro Airport Flyer rail card and a 2007 Network West Midlands Daytripper ticket

While each private operator had its own range of tickets that were not transferable to another company's services, WMPTE offered a range of tickets that were valid across the entire network with any participating operator. Under Centro, these included: "Centrocard" (covering Bus, Metro and Train), "Busmaster" (covering Bus services only) and "Railmaster" (covering Train services only).

In its final years, the WMPTE provided ticketing under the 'Network West Midlands' brand:

=== nBus ===
nBus tickets were valid on almost all operators' services in the county. Tickets could be purchased for travel within various local travel areas or across the whole of the county, and were valid for periods ranging from one day to a year.

=== nTrain ===
nTrain passes were valid on all local train services within the Network West Midlands zonal rail map, and to select out-of-county stations in the Birmingham travel-to-work metropolitan area.

=== Swift ===
Swift is the multi-modal, multi-operator smart travel card, similar to the Oyster card scheme in London, that was introduced by WMPTE. Rather than being a single card, it is a range of contactless passes and cards that share a common system and brand name. WMPTE began a phased rollout of the Swift card scheme in 2012, which was still ongoing in 2016 when responsibility for the scheme passed to TfWM.

== See also ==
- Transport in Birmingham
