= West Midlands Bus route 8 =

Circular bus route in Birmingham, England

8

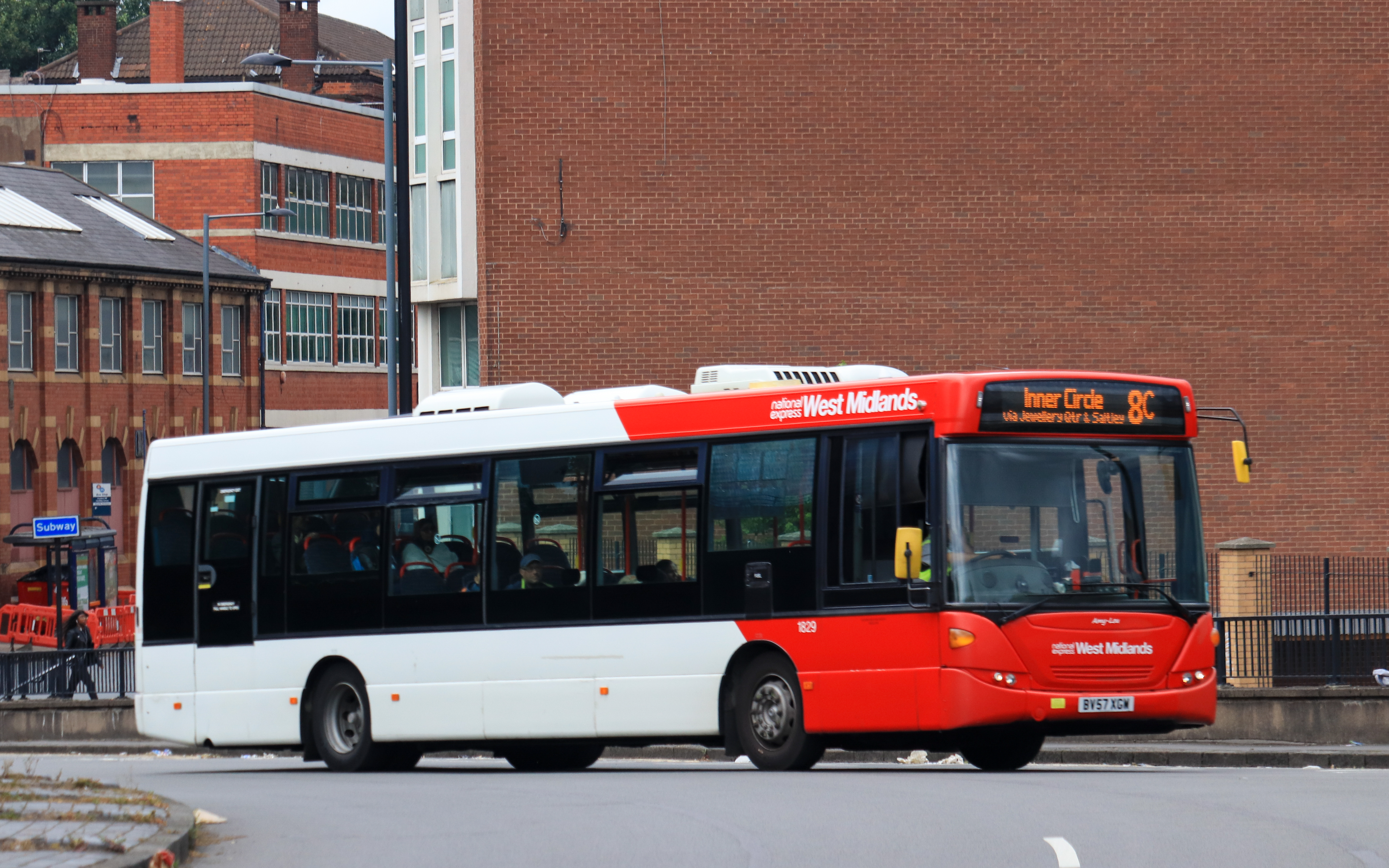
- National Express West Midlands Scania OmniLink 1829 passes Hockley Circus

Overview
- Operator: West Midlands Bus
- Garage: Perry Barr
- Vehicle: BYD D8UR-DD ADL Enviro400EV; Scania OmniLink

Route
- Start: Saltley or Bordesley Green
- Via: Birmingham Inner Ring Road
- End: Saltley or Bordesley Green

West Midlands Bus route 8, also known as the Birmingham Inner Circle, is a roughly circular bus route in Birmingham, England. It follows the city's middle ring road with some small deviations on parts of the route. The service dates back to the days of Birmingham City Transport.

== Present ==
Like the Outer Circle service 11, buses on the 8 travel both anti-clockwise (8A) and clockwise (8C). The service is operated by West Midlands Bus with Scania OmniLink single deck buses, and was formerly operated by Mercedes-Benz O405N buses, several of which were branded for the Inner Circle.

In 2004, the Birmingham Repertory Theatre staged the musical "Ridin' The Number 8" by Laurie Hornsby and Euan Rose, in which a cast of 'Brummie' characters board an Inner Circle bus and reminisce about the people and places they encounter along the route.

In October 2020, the 8 transferred to Perry Barr garage upon the closure of Bordesley; where the routes had been operated since 2005.

On 1 November 2026, operations were transferred to West Midlands Bus as part of the sale of National Express West Midlands operations.

== Route ==
(Anti-clockwise from Saltley Gate, Alum Rock. Opposite direction for clockwise)

- Saltley Gate/ Alum Rock interchange
- Nechells
- Newtown interchange (A34)
- Hockley interchange
- Jewellery Quarter
- Five Ways interchange (Broad Street, Birmingham)
- Lee Bank
- Highgate
- Sparkbrook interchange
- Small Heath interchange
- Bordesley interchange
- Saltley Gate/ Alum Rock interchange
