= Trams in Birmingham =

Trams in Birmingham may refer to:

- Birmingham Corporation Tramways (1904–1953)
- West Midlands Metro (1999–)
