= West Midlands Bus route 11 =

Bus route in Birmingham, England

11

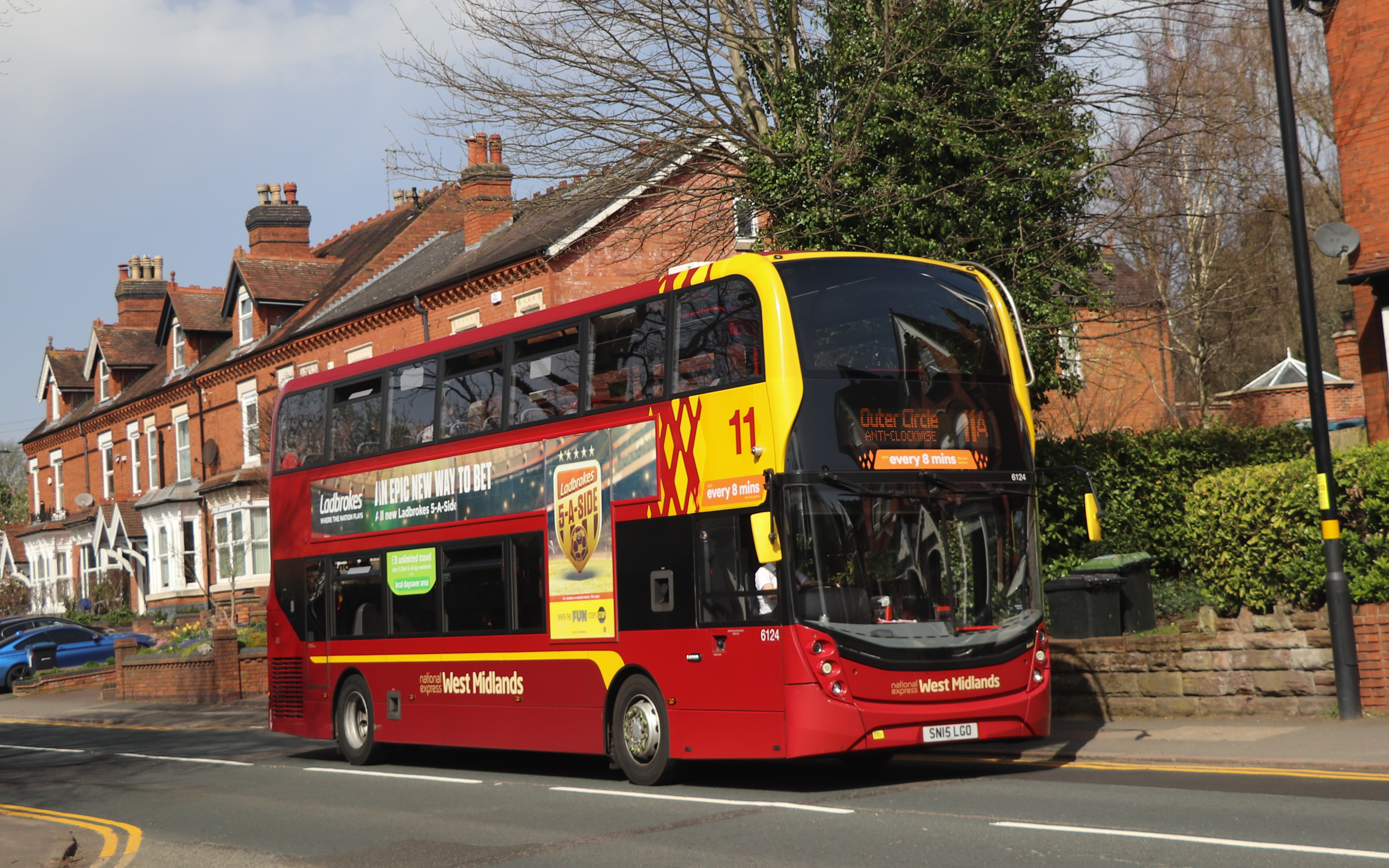
- National Express West Midlands Alexander Dennis Enviro400 MMC 6124 passing Lordswood Road, Harborne

Overview
- Operator: West Midlands Bus
- Garage: Acocks Green

Route
- Start: Acocks Green
- Via: A4040
- End: Erdington (clockwise)/Perry Barr (anticlockwise)
- Length: 27 miles (43 km)

West Midlands Bus route 11, also known as the Birmingham Outer Circle, is a 27-mile (43 km) route that circumnavigates Birmingham via the A4040 apart from a small deviation via the B4182 and A4030 in Bearwood. It is operated by West Midlands Bus. It operated in both clockwise and anti-clockwise directions as routes 11C and 11A, however since July 2021 the service was split so 11A buses would terminate at Perry Barr and then return as an 11C to Acocks Green, with 11C buses terminating at Erdington, returning as a 11A service to Acocks Green.

Since bus deregulation in 1986, several companies have competed on sections of this route. Falcon Travel, Serverse Travel, Birmingham Motor Traction, AM PM Travel, Joe's Travel, GRS Travel and Discount Travel Solutions have traversed the entire route.

== History ==
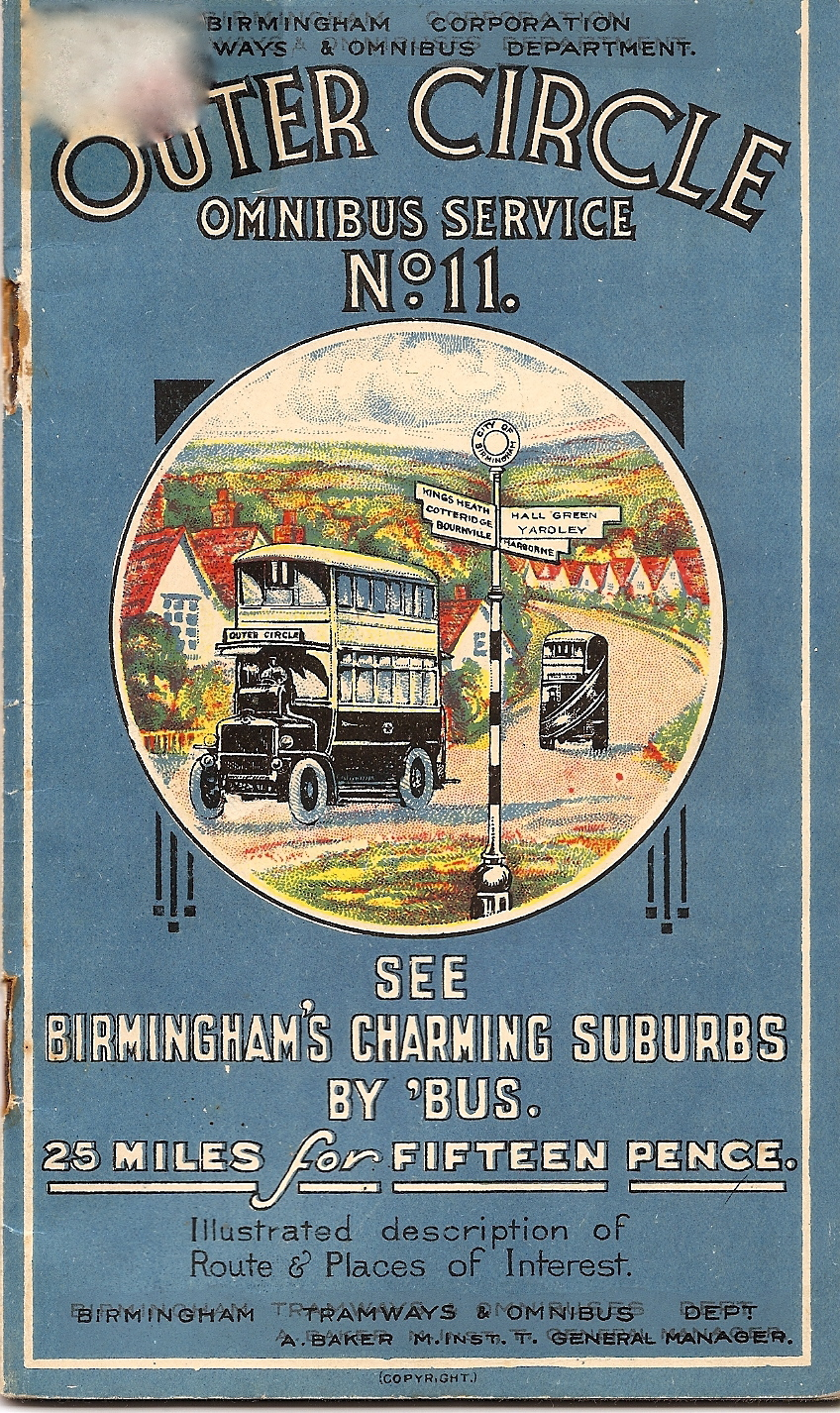
Guide to the 'Outer Circle' route, issued by the "Birmingham Corporation Tramways & Omnibus Department", which operated under that title from 1928 until November 1937

Route 11 was Europe's longest urban bus route after Coventry's route 360 until it was withdrawn in 2016. It first came into existence as two routes in 1923: route 10 ran from King's Heath to the King's Head (Hagley Road) via Cotteridge, and route 11 from Six Ways Erdington to Acocks Green and Moseley. The route was first operated as a complete circuit on 26 April 1926, the idea being to better link the suburbs of Birmingham, as most routes at that time travelled in and out of the city.

The route was operated by Birmingham City Transport until the formation of West Midlands Passenger Transport Executive (WMPTE) on 1 October 1969. In 1986, WMPTE's bus operations were taken over by West Midlands Travel who later operated as National Express West Midlands.

The route is traversed annually by a cavalcade of vintage buses. Run by the Aston Manor Road Transport Museum, the event began in 1977 and has continued each year since with the exception of 2000, in which it was cancelled due to a national fuel shortage.

The route was upgraded in 2004 by Centro. Over £25 million was spent on CCTV coverage, bus priority measures, new shelters with electronic information displays and new low-floor buses.

AM PM Travel began operating on the service in October 2009, increasing the frequency of their route in December. Six re-furbished Volvo Olympians entered onto the new service fitted with Wi-Fi technology. AM PM Travel later ceased operating.

The 11A was one of the routes chosen for service extras when National Express West Midlands withdrew their MCW Metrobus vehicles on 24 July 2010.

In 2012 Joe's Travel began operating on the service using step entrance Dennis Darts, but withdrew its services on 20 May 2014.

In September 2014, GRS Travel began operating the service with two buses on route 11C and two on route 11A. However, in July 2015 they ceased operation following a Public Inquiry.

In March 2015, Social Travel commenced operating eight weekday services a day on route 11C. In April 2018 this was reduced to just four weekday services a day on route 11C.

In April 2017, Discount Travel Solutions commenced operating eight weekday services a day on route 11A, later launching on route 11C. Discount Travel ceased operation in July 2022.

The route was temporarily split into two in July 2021 owing to road works, as of April 2025 it remains split. Some media interpreted it as being a permanent end of the route.

On 1 November 2026, operations were transferred to West Midlands Bus Limited as part of the sale of National Express West Midlands operations.

== Route ==
A full circuit can take up to three hours to complete, with the service carrying 50,000 passengers each day. There are 266 bus stops on the route. The route serves 233 schools, colleges or universities, 69 leisure and community facilities, 40 pubs, 19 retail centres, six hospitals, and one prison. It also links some 15 commercial centres, and passes Cadbury's in Bournville, one of the world's largest chocolate factories.

The outer circle is the traditional route for the Free Radio Birmingham Walkathon, a sponsored walk which raises funds for charity.

Route 11 operates with an off-peak weekday frequency in each direction.

As a temporary measure introduced on Sunday 4 July 2021, the service was split in two due to lengthy delays caused by roadworks at Perry Barr, though as of April 2025 this measure is still in place.

=== Current route ===
Route 11 operates via these primary locations (listed in a clockwise direction):

- Acocks Green
- Hall Green
- Sarehole Mill
- Kings Heath
- Cotteridge
- Selly Oak
- Harborne
- Bearwood
- Birmingham City Hospital
- Winson Green
- Handsworth
- Perry Barr
- Witton
- Marsh Hill
- Erdington
- Tyburn Road & Bromford
- Fox and Goose Ward End
- Stechford station
- Yardley & Yew Tree
- Acocks Green

== In popular culture ==
The Birmingham band Woodbine's eponymous 1999 album features the track "Outer Circle", a tribute to the bus route. In 2001 a group of musicians from Birmingham created a concert based on the route.

On 11 November 2008, (starting at 11:00), humourist Jon Bounds spent eleven hours travelling the route, documenting his journey online, using Twitter, Facebook and a blog, elevenbus.co.uk.

In October 2009 Kevin Beresford, a 57-year-old resident of Birmingham, created a calendar dedicated to the anti-clockwise portion of the route.

The Outer Circle has also been the inspiration for a Scottish Country Dance. Devised by Kenneth Reid from the Royal Scottish Country Dance Society's Birmingham Branch, it is regularly featured on dance programmes all over the world. The 48 bar reel represents the circuit of route 11, with the diagonal corner chain formations inside, and the travelling couple outside of the set highlighting the fluctuation speed and congestion within the route.

The route has also been the inspiration for a collection of short stories, written by Birmingham-based writers and edited by Jay Barton.
