= Birmingham City Transport =

Local authority operating public transport in Birmingham

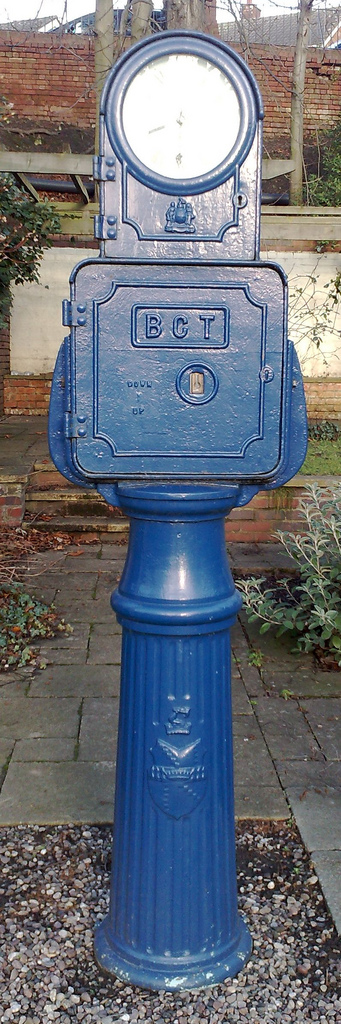
A Bundy Clock used by Birmingham City Transport to ensure that bus drivers did not depart from outlying termini before the due time; now preserved at Walsall Arboretum.

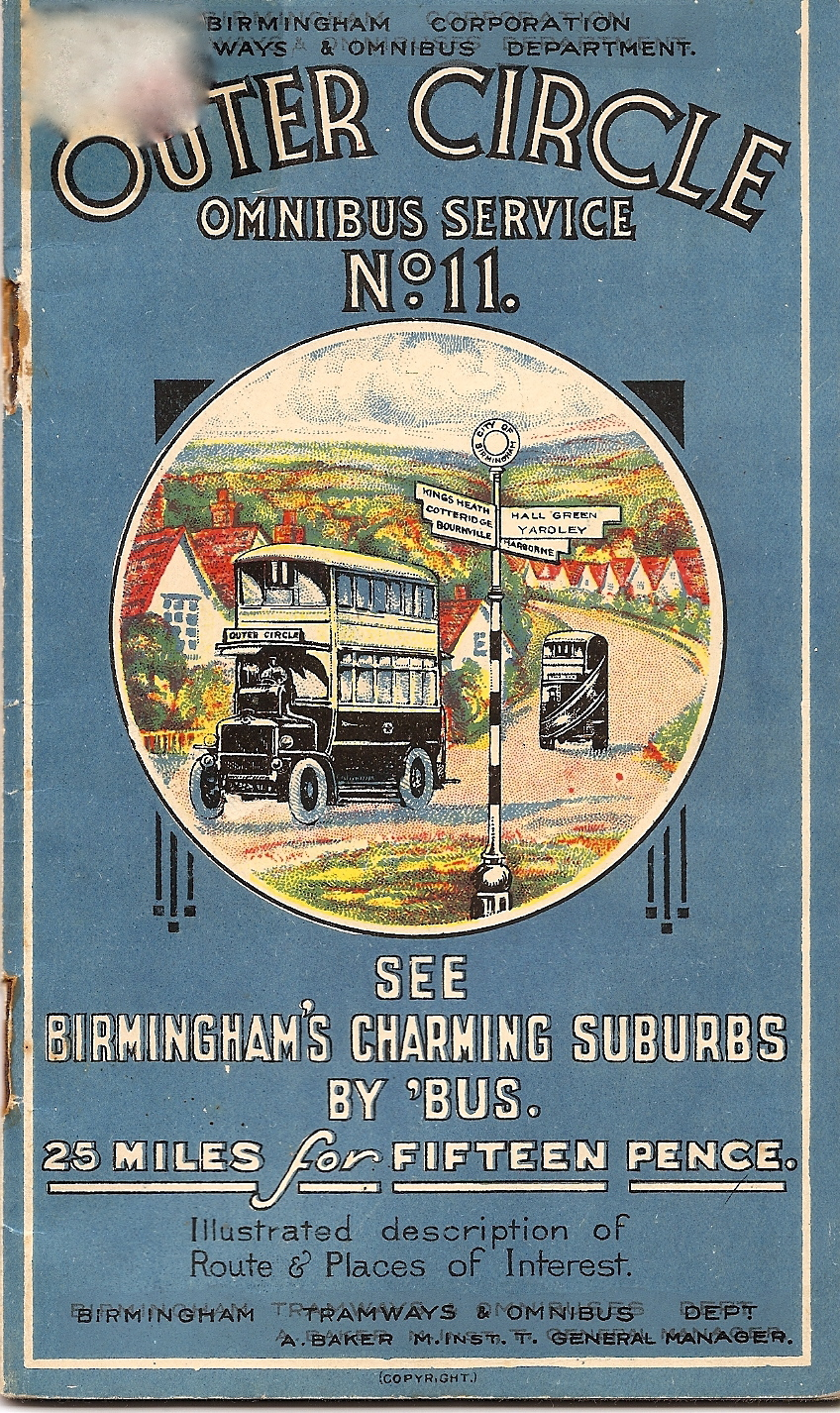
Guide to Birmingham's 'Outer Circle' bus route, issued by the "Birmingham Corporation Tramways & Omnibus Department"

Birmingham City Transport was the local authority-owned undertaking that provided road-based public transport in Birmingham, England, between 1899 and 1969. It was locally known as the Corporation Buses. Initially, it was called Birmingham Corporation Tramways, and, after the first motor bus services started in July 1914, it became Birmingham Corporation Tramways and Omnibus Department in 1928. Finally, in November 1937, it was renamed "Birmingham City Transport", though Birmingham itself had been a City since 1889. It was incorporated into the West Midlands Passenger Transport Executive in 1969.

== Introduction ==
Birmingham City Transport was acknowledged as one of the country's finest transport undertakings. An employee of a neighbouring undertaking once said enviously that one could eat off the floor of a Birmingham bus. Birmingham City Transport ceased to exist at midnight 30 September 1969 when it became the largest component of the new West Midlands Passenger Transport Executive, which at the same time took over the municipal undertakings of Walsall, West Bromwich and Wolverhampton.

Birmingham also possessed a relatively small fleet of trolleybuses and the design of all except the first series ran parallel to the contemporary motor-buses. Birmingham City Transport seems to have inspired remarkable loyalty amongst its officers and troops – even if they did not feel it at the time, their pride is unmistakable now Birmingham City Transport has gone. Birmingham City Transport was a conservative operator will well-established principles – too conservative, some would say. In the 1920s, Birmingham led the way with closed top double-decker buses. When Birmingham City Transport did evolve its "New Look" bus in 1950, it took the British bus industry by storm.

Many operators saddled themselves and their passengers with unreliable standee single-deckers but Birmingham City Transport exercised caution and then were the first city with one-man double deckers. Birmingham City Transport's reputation was founded on quality and attention to detail.

== History ==
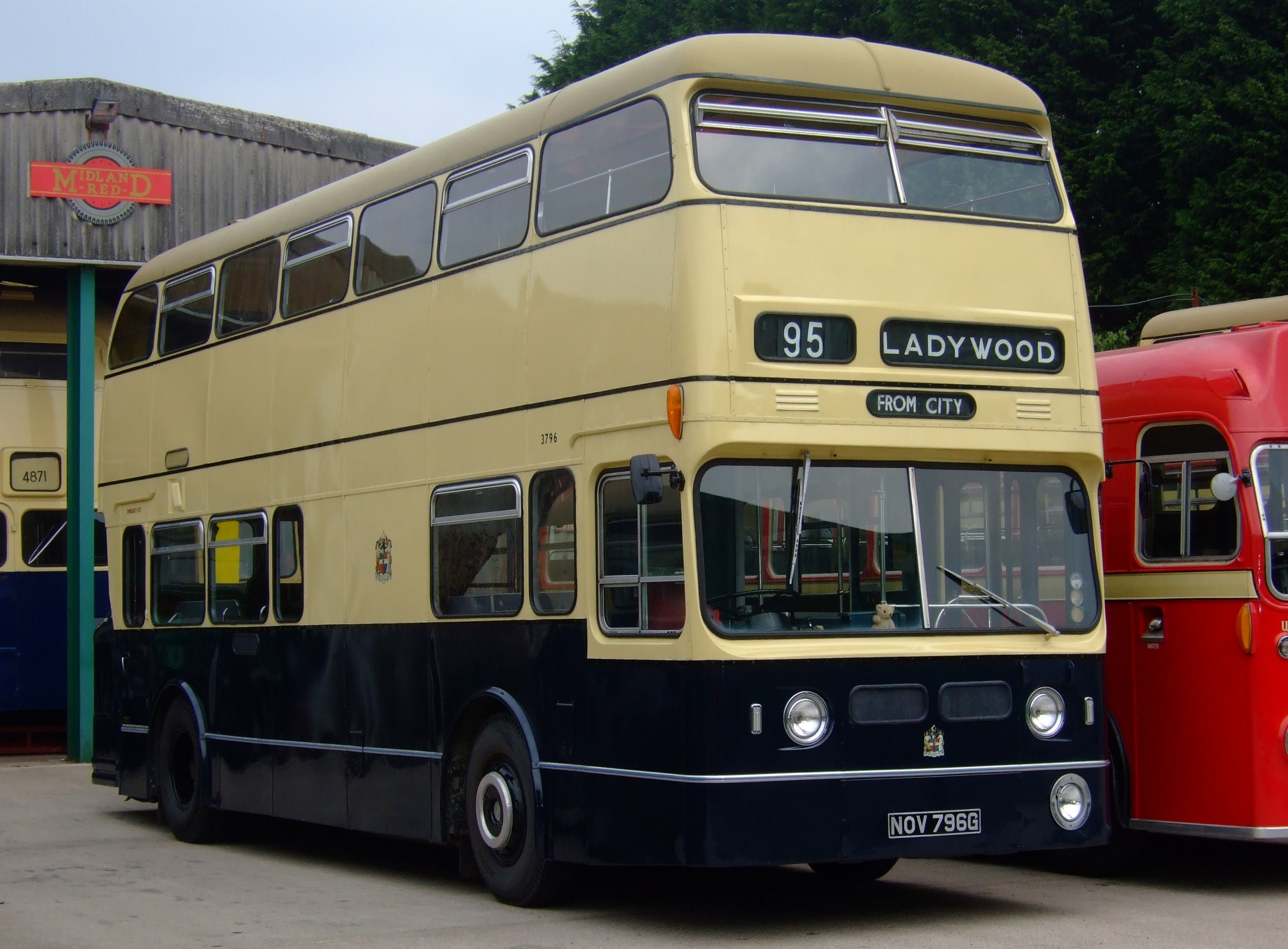
A preserved Daimler Fleetline CRG6LX bought new by Birmingham City Transport

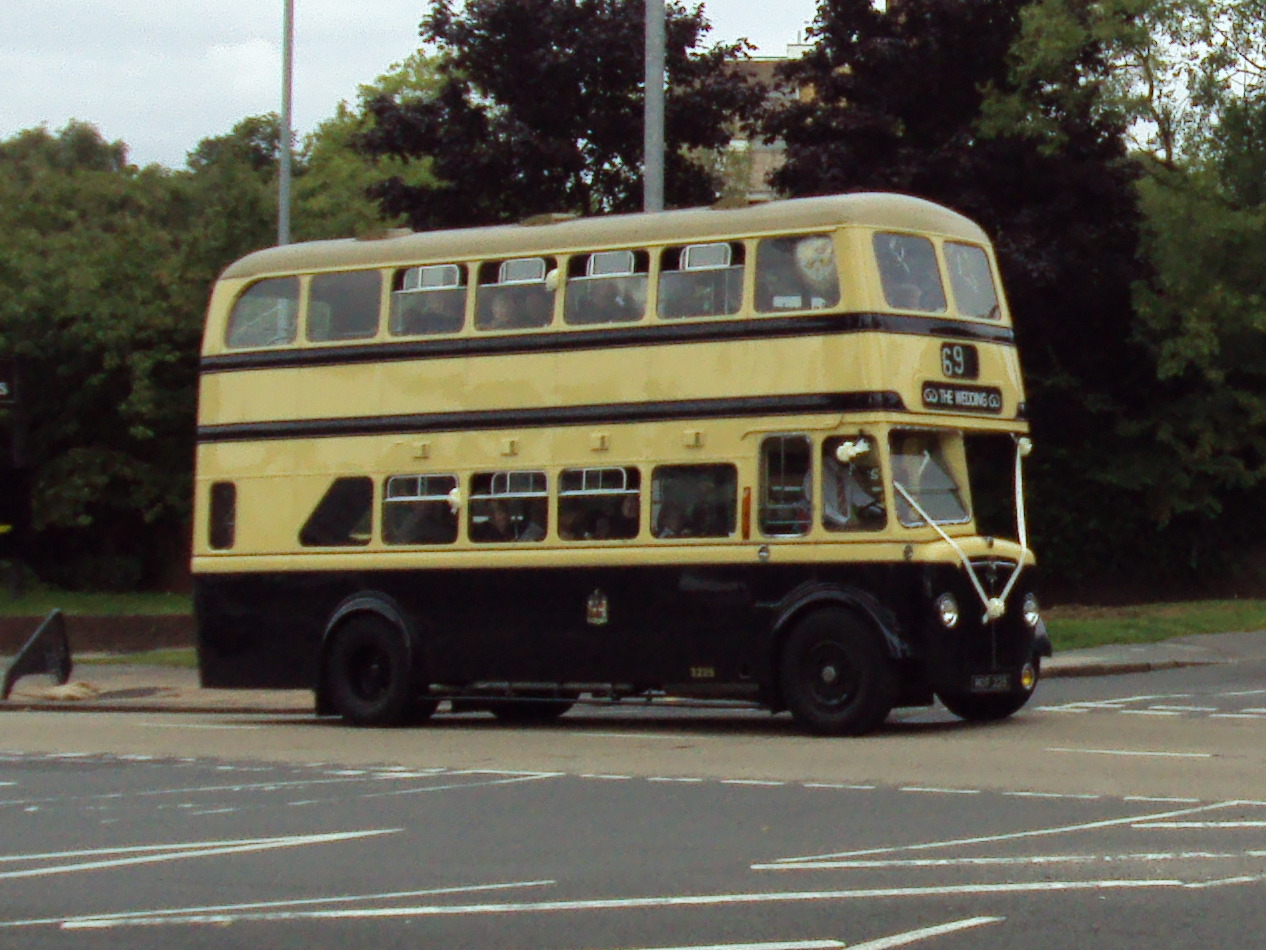
A preserved bus heads along the A38 Bristol Road near the Gun Barrels pub, Birmingham

In 1899 Birmingham Corporation decided to follow the example of municipalities elsewhere and operate its own tramways upon expiry of the various leases granted by the corporation to private companies.

Powers to operate and electrify its own tramways were sought, resulting in the Birmingham Corporation Act 1903.

The Corporation possessed limited powers to operate its own motorbuses under the Birmingham Corporation Act, 1903, but these powers restricted the running of such vehicles to periods during the construction, alteration or repair of tramways, or in prolongation of any tramway route, the extension of which might be contemplated. By November 1913 two motor omnibus routes were running from Selly Oak (tram terminus), one to Rednal and the other, overlapping the first route between Selly Oak and Longbridge but then striking west to Rubery. Ten Daimler 40 h.p. buses with 34-seat bodies, numbered 1–10, were purchased to operate the services and were thus the first buses to carry the Corporation blue and cream livery.

The country was soon plunged into the Great War (1914–18), and many operators were faced with the commandeering of their motorbus chassis. Services had to be pruned as a result, and because BCT was unable to provide any "extras", Austins at Longbridge ran some 15-20 of their own buses which were the origin of the various independent services to works that are still a feature today. However more problems were on the way; in mid-1917 services were again drastically cut due to the acute shortage of petrol.

By February 1926 the tramway route from Selly Oak had been extended to both Rednal and Rubery, so the Corporation decided to replace the two motor bus routes with tramways routes.

In 1937 Birmingham City Transport was created out of Birmingham Corporation Tramways. The name reflected the fact that there was now a mixture of trams, trolleybuses and motorbuses operated in Birmingham.

In 1945, to celebrate VE Day, an illuminated tram ran in the city.

Between 1947 and 1954, Birmingham City Transport purchased 1,748 new buses to replace its entire fleet of trams and trolleybuses, along with utility buses (built to inferior standards during the Second World War), and all except 40 or so of its pre-War fleet. The last tram ran on 4 July 1953.

Birmingham City Transport placed a turban ban on all employees in 1960, which led to Sikhs going on strike. The ban was lifted in 1962.

From the earliest days of motorbus operation the Corporation adhered to an agreement with the Midland Red bus company that routes would not operate beyond the city boundary. In return, Midland Red services from outside of the city would charge fares above that levied on the Corporation buses to discourage 'local' passengers. The only exceptions were jointly operated routes to Soho, Bearwood, Oldbury / Dudley and West Bromwich / Wednesbury (the latter with West Bromwich Corporation).

Birmingham City Transport survived until 1969 when it became incorporated in the West Midlands Passenger Transport Executive.

== See also ==
- List of bus operators of the United Kingdom
- The Transport Museum, Wythall
- Trolleybuses in Birmingham
