= Aston Manor Road Transport Museum =

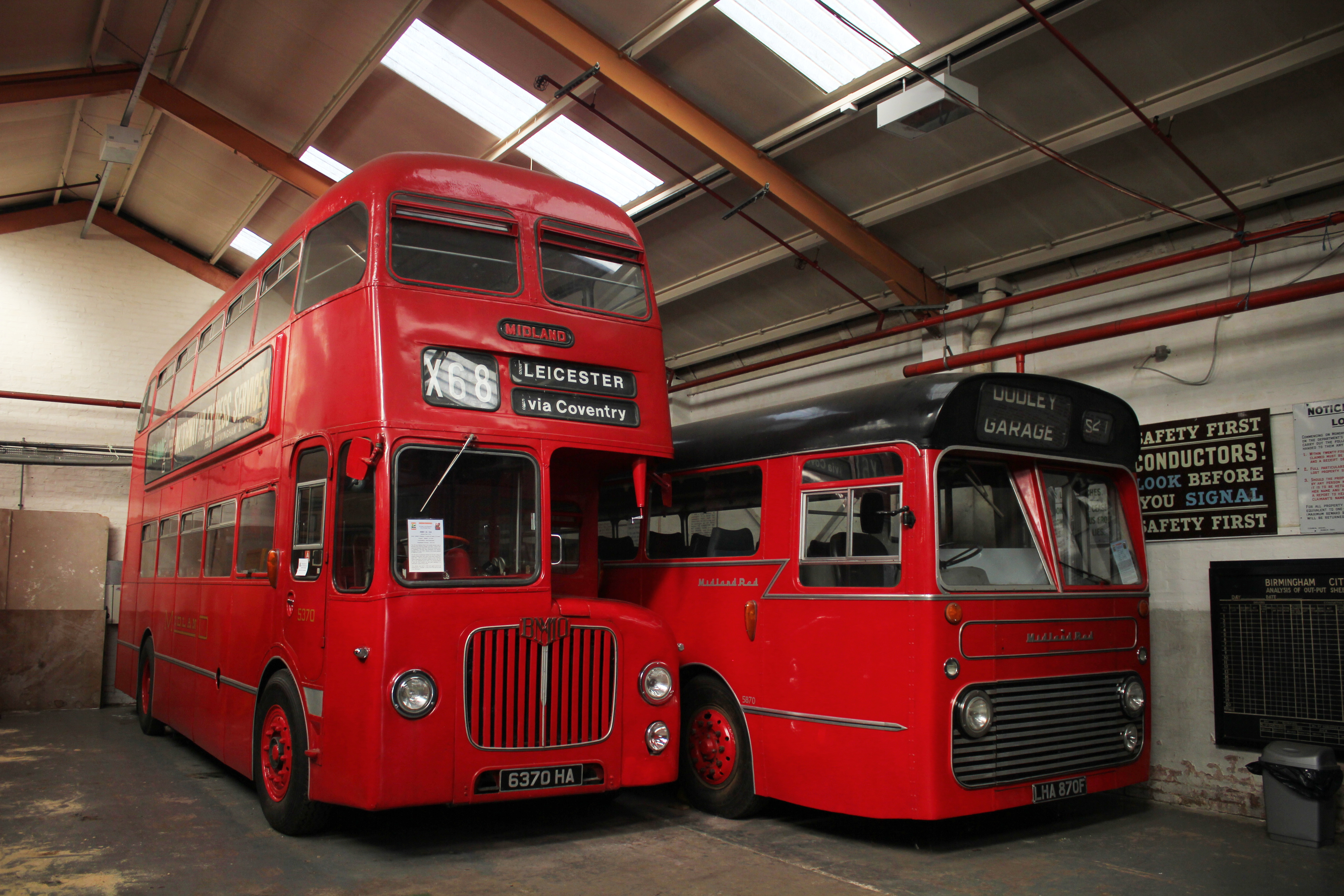
- Midland Red buses inside Aston Manor Road Transport Museum in September 2020
- Established: 14 November 1988
- Location: Shenstone Drive Northgate, Aldridge, England WS9 8TP
- Coordinates: 52.611881°N 1.922368°W
- Type: Transport museum
- Visitors: 4000 (2022)
- Website: amrtm.org

Aldridge Transport Museum, home to the Aston Manor Road Transport Museum's collection of vehicles is an independent transport museum in Aldridge, Walsall, England. Until December 2011 the museum occupied the former Birmingham Corporation Tramways Witton Tram Depot, in the Aston district of Birmingham, run by a registered charity.

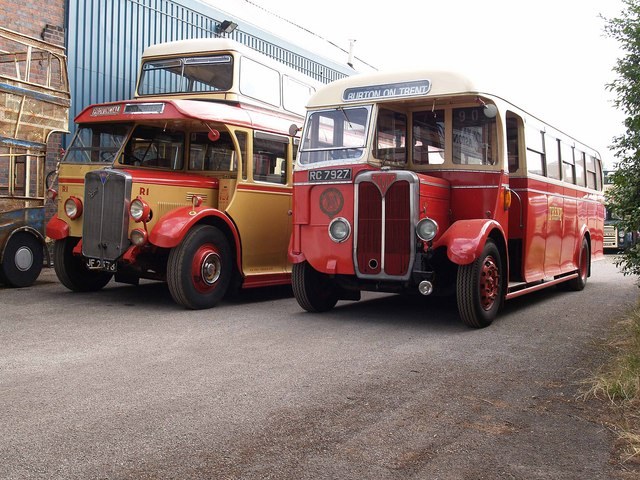
Buses at the Aston Manor Transport Museum

The museum hosted the 40th birthday party of Charles, Prince of Wales, on 14 November 1988, when he formally opened the museum.

Following a decision by Birmingham City Council to cease funding the rent on the Witton Tram Depot, it closed in October 2011. Between then and December that year, the collection was moved to the Beecham Business Park, home to the former Jack Allen dustcart assembly plant, in nearby Aldridge. Subsequently, the museum moved again, this time a short distance within Aldridge, to its present location in Shenstone Drive, Aldridge, where it opened to the public in July 2013. Since reopening, the museum has retained its bus collection but also added an increased number of light commercial vehicles on display.

The museum, which is operated entirely by volunteers, is open on Tuesdays, Saturdays and Sundays from 10:30 to 16:00 throughout the year excluding the Christmas Holiday period. On a number of weekends throughout the year there are special events with a free bus service from Walsall (Hatherton Street) to the museum and back using classic buses. The museum's Classic buses also run free of charge on certain event days to the Chasewater Railway, Lichfield, and around Barr Beacon. The vehicles displayed in the museum are changed over with those which are in safe storage off site giving variety to the exhibits on display at any one time.
