= Birmingham Corporation Tramways =

Birmingham tramway operator (1904-1953)

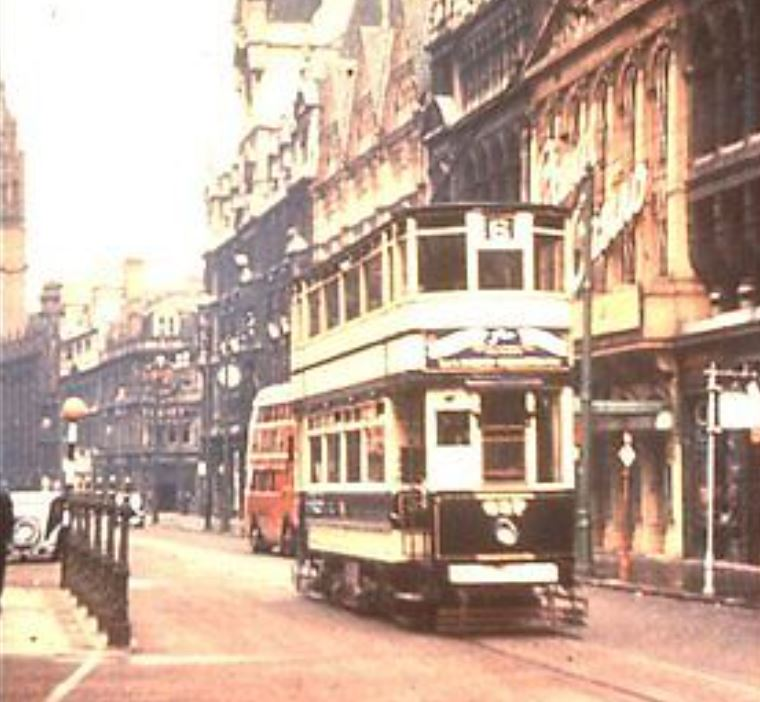
- Birmingham Corporation Tram in 1953, shortly before the service was scrapped.

Operation
- Locale: Birmingham
- Open: 4 January 1904
- Close: 4 July 1953
- Status: Closed

Infrastructure
- Track gauge: 3 ft 6 in (1,067 mm)
- Propulsion system: Electric
- Electrification: (600 V DC)

Statistics
- Route length: 80.5 miles (129.6 km)

Birmingham Corporation Tramways operated a network of tramways in Birmingham from 1904 until 1953. It was the largest narrow-gauge tramway network in the UK, and was built to a gauge of 3 ft 6 in (1,067 mm). It was the fourth largest tramway network in the UK behind London, Glasgow and Manchester.

There were a total of 843 trams (with a maximum of 825 in service at any one time), 20 depots, 45 main routes and a total route length of 80 1/2 miles (129.6 km).

Birmingham Corporation built all the tramways and leased the track to various companies.

Birmingham was a pioneer in the development of reserved trackways which served the suburban areas as the city grew in the 1920s and 1930s.

== History ==
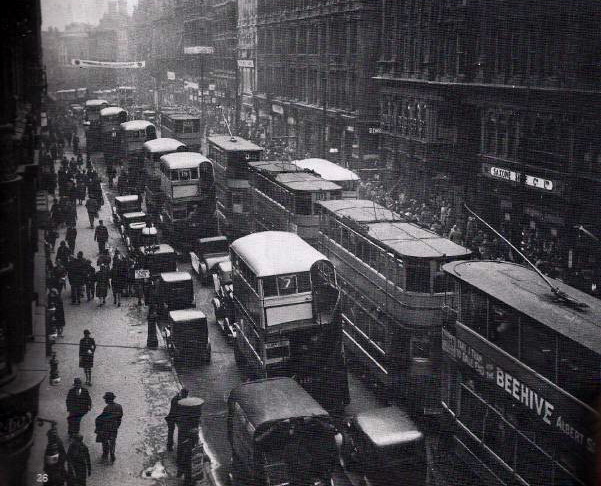
Trams and buses on Corporation Street in 1931.

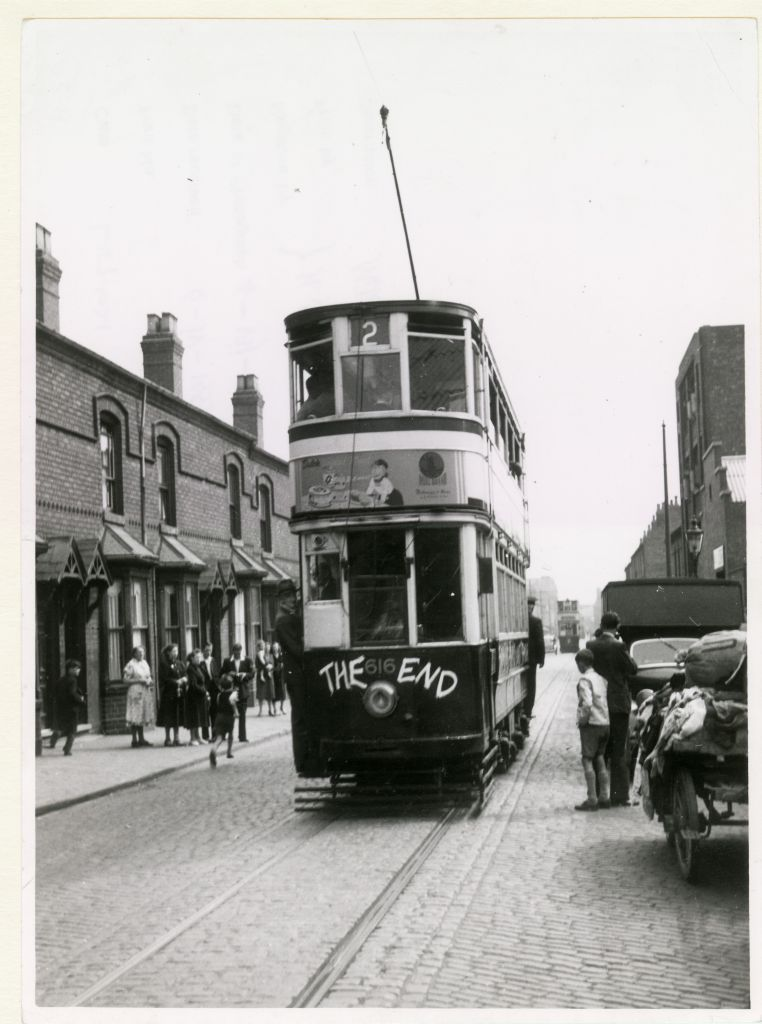
The last tram to run in 1953.

The first trams operated in Birmingham from 1872, and the network expanded throughout the late 19th century. Initially these were horse and steam operated, the first electric trams operated from 1901. Under the terms of the Tramways Act 1870 (33 & 34 Vict. c. 78) the Birmingham Corporation owned all of the tracks within the city boundaries, however, they were forbidden from operating the trams themselves, and so various private companies operated them under lease. It wasn't until 1904 that the Birmingham Corporation took advantage of new legislation, which allowed it to operate trams in its own right as the original concessions expired. By 1912, the corporation had taken over all of the privately operated lines, it also took over other district tramways as the city boundaries were expanded. BCT continued to expand the network into a comprehensive system, and also took over routes extending into the Black Country. The last new route to Stechford was opened in 1928.

Decline set in during the 1930s, when several tram lines were converted to trolleybus operation, as this was seen as being a more economic option than replacing worn out track and rolling stock. Several of the least used lines were also abandoned, and replaced by diesel buses. Reflecting the fact that it now operated buses and trolleybuses as well as trams, BCT changed its name to Birmingham City Transport in 1937.

However, most of the tram network remained in operation until large scale closures began in 1947. The last three lines to Short Heath, Pype Hayes and Erdington were closed simultaneously on 4 July 1953.

Trams eventually returned to the streets of Birmingham on 6 December 2015, after a 62-year gap, when the first part of the West Midlands Metro city-centre extension was opened to Bull Street tram stop.

=== Timeline ===
- 4 January 1904: commence tramway at Aston Road North
- 1 January 1907: took over some City of Birmingham Tramways Company Ltd routes, (CBTC was a British Electric Traction controlled company) – the majority of the company's routes having been owned by Birmingham Corporation from their inception.
- 1 July 1911: took over the former cable tramway to Handsworth
- 1 January 1912: took over lines owned by Erdington Urban District Council, but operated by Birmingham Corporation Tramways, which subsequently passed into the hands of Birmingham Corporation following expansion of the city's boundaries in 1911.
- 1 January 1912: took over City of Birmingham Tramways Company Ltd – the remainder of the company's routes, ownership of which had passed to Birmingham Corporation from the local councils of Aston Manor, Handsworth, and King's Norton and Northfield, following expansion of the city boundaries in 1911.
- 1 April 1924: took over operation of West Bromwich Corporation-owned lines previously leased to the Birmingham and Midland Tramways Joint Committee South Staffordshire Tramways Company, a British Electric Traction subsidiary
- 1 April 1928: took over Birmingham and Midland Tramways Joint Committee Birmingham and District Power and Traction Co Ltd - main line to Dudley.
- 18 October 1927: name changed to Birmingham Corporation Tramway and Omnibus Department.
- 9 November 1937: name changed to Birmingham City Transport.

== Routes ==
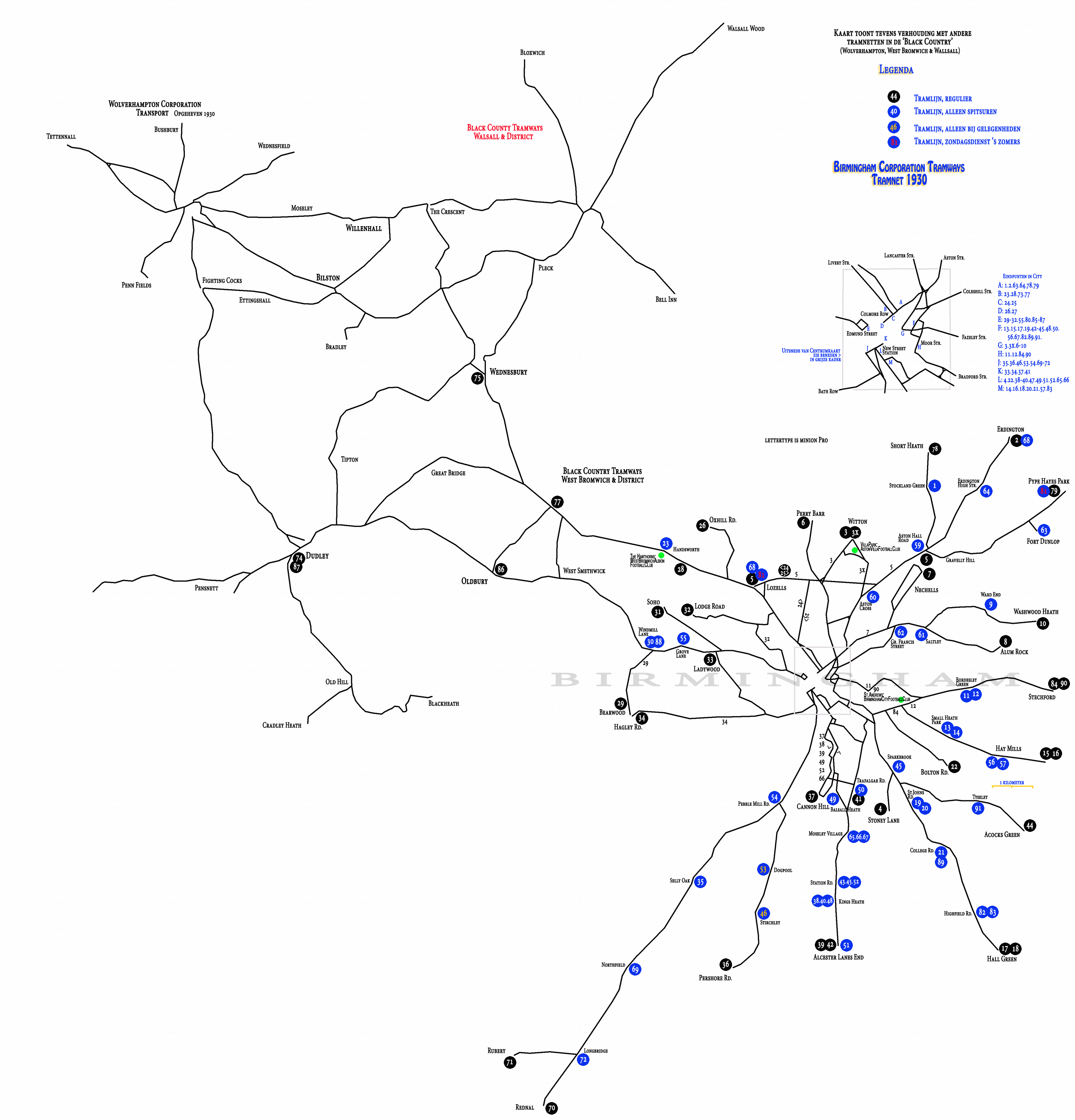
Map of the tram routes in 1930

Route	Description	Abandoned	Short workings
2	Steelhouse Lane to Erdington	4 July 1953	59 Steelhouse Lane to Gravelly Hill, 60 Steelhouse Lane to Aston Cross, 64 Steelhouse Lane to High Street, Erdington
3	Martineau Street to Witton via Six Ways	11 September 1939	
3x	Martineau Street to Witton via Aston Cross	31 December 1949	
4	Station Street to Stoney Lane	5 January 1937	
5	Lozells to Gravelly Hill	30 September 1950	
6	Martineau Street to Perry Barr	21 December 1949	
7	Martineau Street to Nechells		
8	Martineau Street to Alum Rock	30 September 1950	61 Martineau Street via the Gate Inn, Saltley to Pelham Arms (Sladefield Road)
10	Martineau Street to Washwood Heath	30 September 1950	9 Martineau Street to Ward End Fox & Goose Pub, 62 inward working of route 10
15	High Street to South Yardley	2 October 1948	13 High Street to Small Heath Park, 56 High Street to Hay Mills
16	Station Street to South Yardley	6 January 1934	14 Station Street to Small Heath Park, 57 Station Street to Hay Mills
17	High Street to Stratford Road (College Road)	5 January 1937	19 High Street to Stratford Road (St. John's Street), 58 High Street to Stoney Lane/Stratford Road, 82 High Street to Stratford Road (Fox Hollies Road/Highfields Road)
18	Station Street to Stratford Road	5 January 1937	21 Station Street to Stratford Road (College Road)
20	Station Street to Stratford Road (St. John's Road)		
22	Station Street to Bolton Road	4 February 1930	
23	Colmore Row to Handsworth	1 April 1939	28 Colmore Row to New Inns, Crocketts Lane, Handsworth
24	Colmore Row to Lozells via Wheeler Street (clockwise 25)	1 April 1939	
25	Colmore Row to Lozells via Wheeler Street (anticlockwise 24)	7 August 1933	
26	Colmore Row to Oxhill Road	1 April 1939	27 Colmore Row to Stafford Road, Soho Road, Handsworth
29	City to Bearwood via Dudley Road	30 September 1939	30 Edmund Street to Windmill Lane, Cape Hill, Smethwick, 55 Edmund Street to Dudley Road/Grove Lane
31	Edmund Street to Soho	30 September 1939	
32	Edmund Street to Lodge Road	29 March 1947	
33	Navigation Street to Ladywood	30 August 1947	
34	Navigation Street to Bearwood via Hagley Road	9 August 1930	
36	City to Cotteridge	5 May 1952	46 Navigation Street to Stirchley
37	City to Cannon Hill Park	1 October 1949	
39	City to Alcester Lanes End	1 October 1949	38 Hill Street to High Street/Vicarage Road, Kings Heath via Balsall Heath, 49 Navigation Street to Mary Street/Park Road, Balsall Heath, 52 Hill Street to Station Road, Kings Heath via Balsall Heath, 66 Hill Street to Moseley via Balsall Heath
42	City to Alcester Lanes End	1 October 1949	43 High Street to Station Road, Kings Heath via Moseley Road, 48 High Street to High Street/Vicarage Road, Kings Heath, 67 Dale End to Moseley via Bradford Street
44	Dale End/Albert Street to Acocks Green	5 January 1937	91 High Street to Warwick Road, Tyseley
45	Dale End/Albert Street to Sparkbrook	5 January 1937	
50	High Street to Moseley Road depot	1 October 1949	41 Navigation Street to Moseley Road Depot
51	Hill Street to Alcester Lane End	1 October 1949	40 Hill Street to High Street/Vicarage Road, Kings Heath via Leopold Street, 65 Hill Street to Moseley via Leopold Street
53	Navigation Street to Dogpool Lane		
63	Steelhouse Lane to Fort Dunlop	4 July 1953	
68	Villa Road to Soho Road, Lozells, Gravelly Hill and Erdington (Sundays only)	1923	
70	Navigation Street to Rednal	5 July 1952	35 Navigation Street to Selly Oak, 54 Navigation Street to Pebble Mill Road, 69 Navigation Street to Northfield, 72 Navigation Street to Longbridge
71	Navigation Street to Rubery	5 July 1952	
74	City to Dudley	1 April 1939	74 Livery Street to Carters Green, West Bromwich, 76 Colmore Road to Great Bridge, 77 Colmore Row to Spon Lane/High Street, West Bromwich
75	City to Wednesbury	1 April 1939	
78	Steelhouse Lane to Short Heath	4 July 1953	1 Steelhouse Lane to Stockland Green
79	Steelhouse Lane to Pype Hayes Park	4 July 1953	63 Steelhouse Lane to Holly Lane/Tyburn Road
81	Villa Road to Soho Road, Lozells to Pype Hayes (Sundays only)	1930	
84	City to Stechford	2 October 1948	12 High Street to Bordesley Green (Blake Street) via Deritend and Coventry Road
87	City to Dudley	30 September 1939	85 Edmund Street to Spon Lane, West Bromwich via Smethwick, 86 Edmund Street to Oldbury via Smethwick, 88 Windmill Lane to Spon Lane, West Bromwich via Smethwick
90	City to Stechford	2 October 1948	11 High Street to Bordesley Green (Blake Lane) via Fazeley Street

== Depots and works ==
- Arthur Street Depot see Coventry Road
- Birchfield Road Depot, acquired from Handsworth District Council 1911, converted to motorbus use 28 October 1925
- Bournbrook, Dawlish Road, acquired 1 January 1912, closed 11 July 1927 (replaced by Selly Oak)
- Cotteridge Depot, acquired from King's Norton and Northfield District Council 1912
- Coventry Road Depot (also known as Arthur Street Depot), opened 1907, converted to motorbus use 1 July 1951
- Handsworth Sub-Depot
- Highgate Road Depot, opened 25 November 1913
- Hockley Depot, acquired from Handsworth District Council 1912, converted to motorbus use 2 April 1939, (Motor buses ceased 2006)
- Kyotts Lake Road Works, opened 1907, closed August 1953
- Miller Street Depot, opened 4 January 1904, converted to motorbus use 4 July 1953
- Moseley Road Depot, opened 1907, converted to motorbus use 2 October 1949
- Rosebery Street Depot, opened 1 July 1906, converted to motorbus use 31 August 1947
- Selly Oak Depot, opened 8 July 1927, converted to motorbus use 6 July 1952
- Trafalgar Road Depot
- Tividale B.M.T.C.J. Works
- Washwood Heath Depot, opened 1907, converted to motorbus use 1 October 1950
- West Smethwick Depot
- Witton Depot, acquired 1912. Until 2011, Aston Manor Road Transport Museum

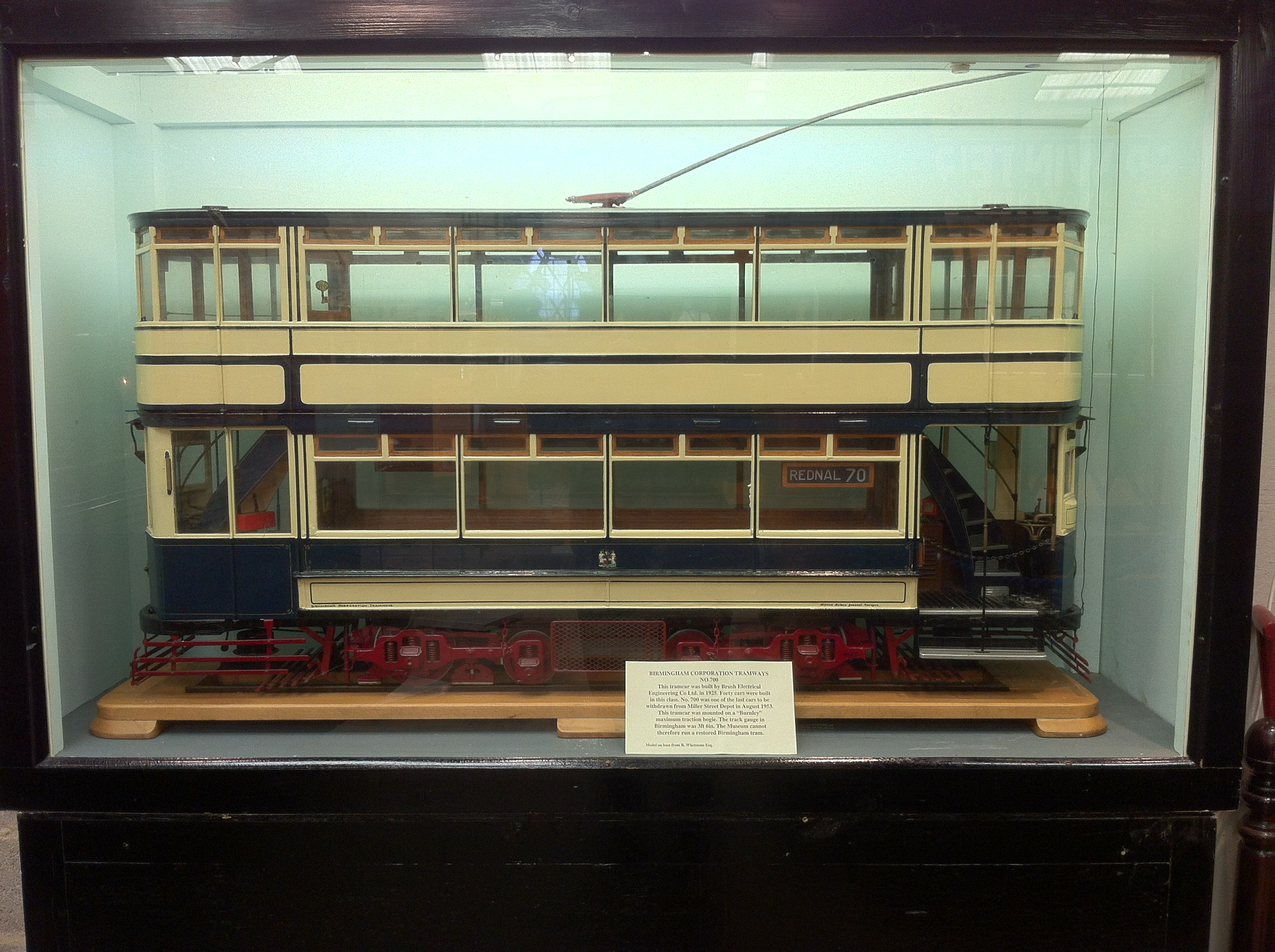
Model of a BCT tram, at the National Tramway Museum

== Tramcar fleet ==
Numbers	Year	Seating capacity	Withdrawn	Notes
1 to 2	1903	28/28	1940-41	Destroyed in air raids
3	1903	28/28	1949	
4 to 7	1903	28/28	1940-41	Destroyed in air raids
8 to 9	1903	28/28	1949	
10 to 12	1903	28/28	1940-41	Destroyed in air raids
13	1903	28/28	1949	
14	1903	28/28	1940-41	Destroyed in air raids
15	1903	28/28	1949	
16	1903	28/28	1940-41	Destroyed in air raids
17 to 20	1903	28/28	1949	
21 to 40	1905	26/22	1930-37	
41 to 70	1905-6	26/22	1930-37	
71 to 106	1906	28/24	1937-39	
107	1906	28/24	1937-39	Under restoration at Aston Manor Road Transport Museum
108 to 220	1906-7	28/24	1937-39	
221 to 270	1907	26/22	1930-37	
271 to 300	1908	26/22	1930-37	
301 to 302	1911	28/24	1950	
303	1911	28/24	1940	Damaged in air raid
304 to 306	1911	28/24	1950	
307	1911	28/24	1940	Damaged in air raid
308 to 323	1911	28/24	1950	
324	1911	28/24	1940	Damaged in air raid
325 to 359	1911	28/24	1950	
360	1911	28/24	1940	Damaged in air raid
361 to 389	1911-12	28/24	1950	
390	1911-12	28/24	1940	Damaged in air raid
391 to 394	1911-12	28/24	1950	
395	1911-12	28/24	1950	Preserved at Thinktank, Birmingham Science Museum
396 to 400	1911-12	28/24	1950	
401 to 438	1912	30/24	1949	
439	1912	30/24	1941	
449 to 450	1912	30/24	1949	
451 to 452	1912	34/34	1949	
453 to 468	1903	26/22	1937-39	
469 to 472	1904	26/22	1925-38	
473	1903	29/26	1924	
474 to 475	1903	29/26	1938	
476 to 477	1903	29/26	1924	
478	1903	29/26	1938	
479	1903	29/26	1924	
480	1903	29/26	1938	
481 to 483	1904	26/22	1938-39	
484 to 501	1904-05	26/22	1937-39	
502 to 511	1904-05	26/22	1913–1928	
512 to 524	1913-14	34/28	1950-53	
525	1913-14	34/28	????	Withdrawn during WWII
526 to 537	1913-14	34/28	1950-53	
538	1913-14	34/28	????	Withdrawn during WWII
539 to 563	1913-14	34/28	1950-53	
564	1913-14	34/28	1941	Destroyed in air raid
565 to 566	1913-14	34/28	1950-53	
567 to 568	1913-14	34/28	1941	Destroyed in air raid
569 to 573	1913-14	34/28	1950-53	
574 to 575	1913-14	34/28	1941	Destroyed in air raid
576 to 581	1913-14	34/28	1950-53	
582	1913-14	34/28	1941	Destroyed in air raid
583 to 586	1913-14	34/28	1950-53	
587 to 636	1920-21	34/28	1949-53	
637 to 661	1923-24	35/28	1952-53	
662	1924	35/28	1952-53	
663	1924	35/28	1941	Destroyed in air raid
664 to 668	1924	35/28	1952-53	
669 to 670	1924	35/28	1941	Destroyed in air raid
671 to 679	1924	35/28	1952-53	
680 to 681	1924	35/28	1941	Destroyed in air raid
682 to 684	1924-25	35/28	1952-52	
685	1924-25	35/28	1941	Destroyed in air raid
686 to 696	1924-25	35/28	1952-53	
697	1924-25	35/28	1941	Destroyed in air raid
698	1924-25	35/28	1952-53	
699	1924-25	35/28	1941	Destroyed in air raid
700 to 701	1924-25	35/28	1952-53	
702 to 703	1925	35/28	1940-41	
704 to 706	1925	35/28	1952	
707 to 708	1925	35/28	1940-41	
709 to 710	1925	35/28	1952	
711	1925	35/28	1940-41	
712 to 713	1925	35/28	1952	
714	1925	35/28	1940-41	
715 to 717	1925	35/28	1952	
718	1925	35/28	1940-41	
719	1925	35/28	1952	
720	1925	35/28	1940-41	
721 to 722	1925	35/28	1952	
723 to 724	1925	35/28	1940-41	
725 to 726	1925	35/28	1952	
727	1925	35/28	1940-41	
728 to 731	1925	35/28	1952	
732 to 761	1926	35/28	1952	
762 to 784	1928	35/27	1952	
785	1928	35/27	1941	Destroyed in air raid
786 to 811	1928	35/27	1952	
812 to 820	1928-29	35/27	1952	
821	1928-29	35/27	1941	
822 to 841	1928-29	35/27	1952	
842	1929	36/27	1952	
843	1930	33/27	1952	

== Statistics ==
Year	No of vehicles	Miles run	Passengers	Revenue
1904 to 1905	20	266,526	4,709,798	£19,103 (£2,008,246 in 2025),
1913 to 1914	551	14,268,244	146,930,986	£635,471 (£63,396,874 in 2025),
1923 to 1924	658	17,521,741	214,338,365	£1,337,093 (£70,282,444 in 2025),
1933 to 1934	762	17,368,227	201,442,970	£1,171,481 (£72,489,707 in 2025),
1943 to 1944	499	11,206,698	130,665,152	£1,088,824 (£41,746,079 in 2025),
1953 to 1954	120	3,391,580	35,554,412	£398,122 (£9,462,524 in 2025),

== Surviving artefacts and infrastructure ==
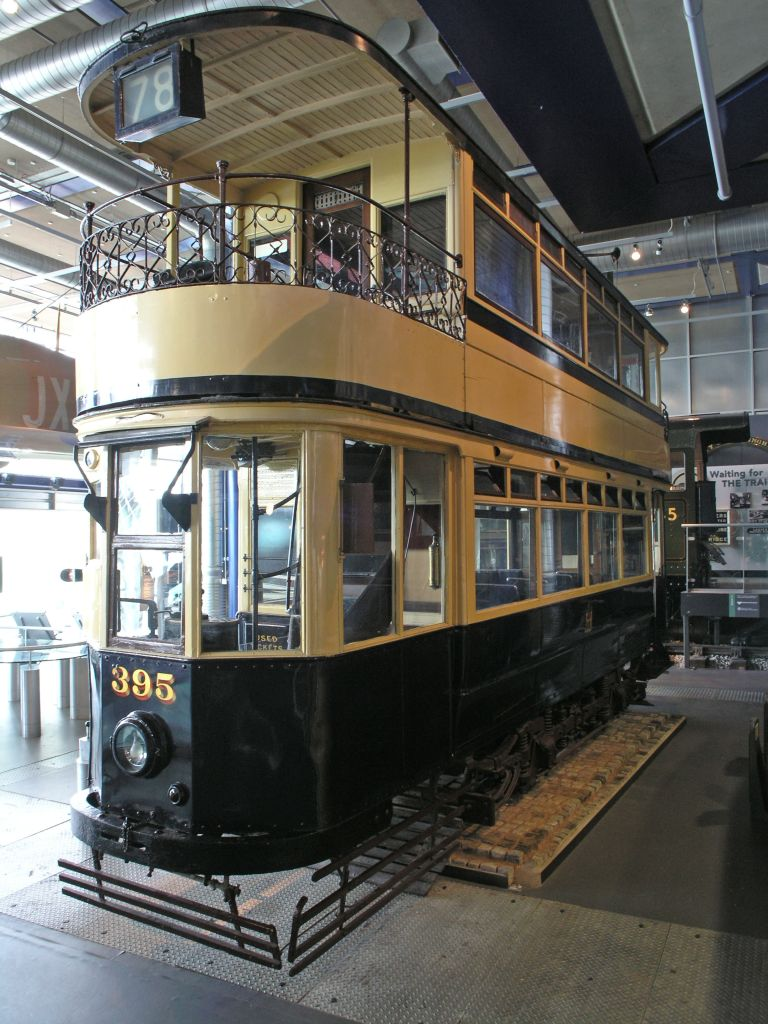
Tram no 395 seen preserved at Thinktank, Birmingham Science Museum.

=== Tramcars ===
- Vehicle 107 (1906) under restoration at Aston Manor Road Transport Museum
- Vehicle 395 (1911) rescued by City of Birmingham Museums and Galleries. Restored in 1953 and presented to Birmingham Science Museum. Now preserved in Thinktank, Birmingham Science Museum

=== Shelters ===
- One preserved at Crich Tramway Museum (53.089842°N 1.485869°W)
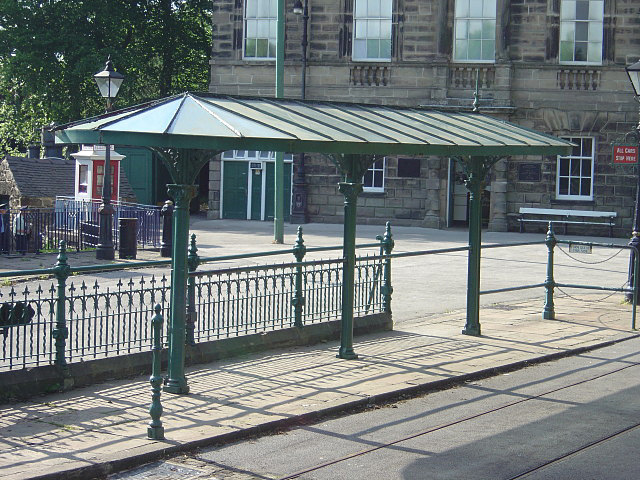
Tramway shelter from Birmingham preserved at the Crich Tramway Museum

=== Depots ===
- Moseley Road Depot - Grade II listed. (52.4543°N 1.8857°W)
- Selly Oak Depot, Harborne Lane - now Storage Units. (52.44189°N 1.94268°W)
- Witton Depot (52.511651°N 1.885399°W)
- Silver Street, Kings Heath - now International Stock (52.43345°N 1.89402°W)
- Miller Street - First Corporation built depot, now used for storing buses by NXWM after privatisation of WMPTE. (52.49274°N 1.89348°W)
- Highgate Road. Closed to trams 1937. Used for buses until the 1950s. (52.45872°N 1.87418°W)
- Steam Tram coke yard, 1899 - Stratford Road/ College Road junction.
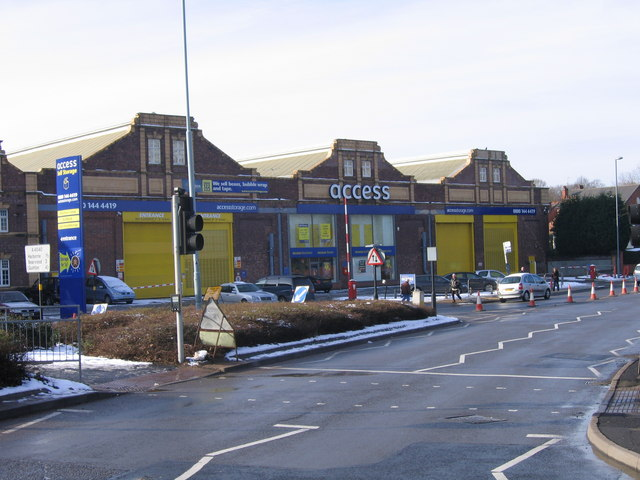
Former tram depot, Selly Oak.

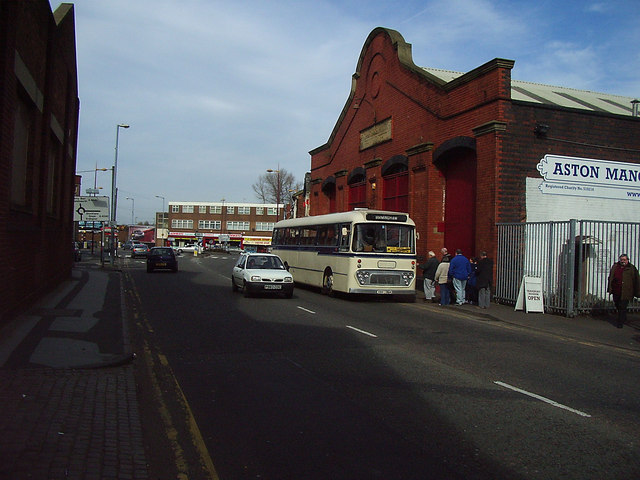
Witton Tram depot.

=== Track ===
- Edmund Street, Birmingham City Centre (52.48054°N 1.90348°W)
- Rednal Terminus (52.384012°N 2.002013°W)
- Manor Farm Park, Selly Oak (52.42658°N 1.95905°W) Tram Track reused (until 2020) in the sluice of the pond in the park. Almost certainly from the tramway that ran down the Bristol Road, a few hundred yards away.
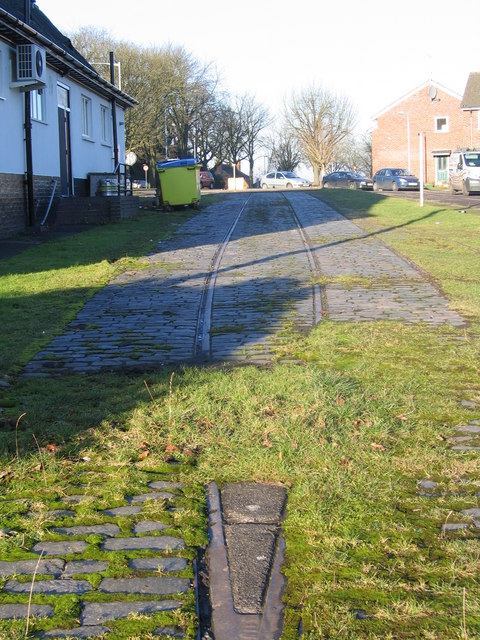
Remains of tram track, Rednal Terminus.

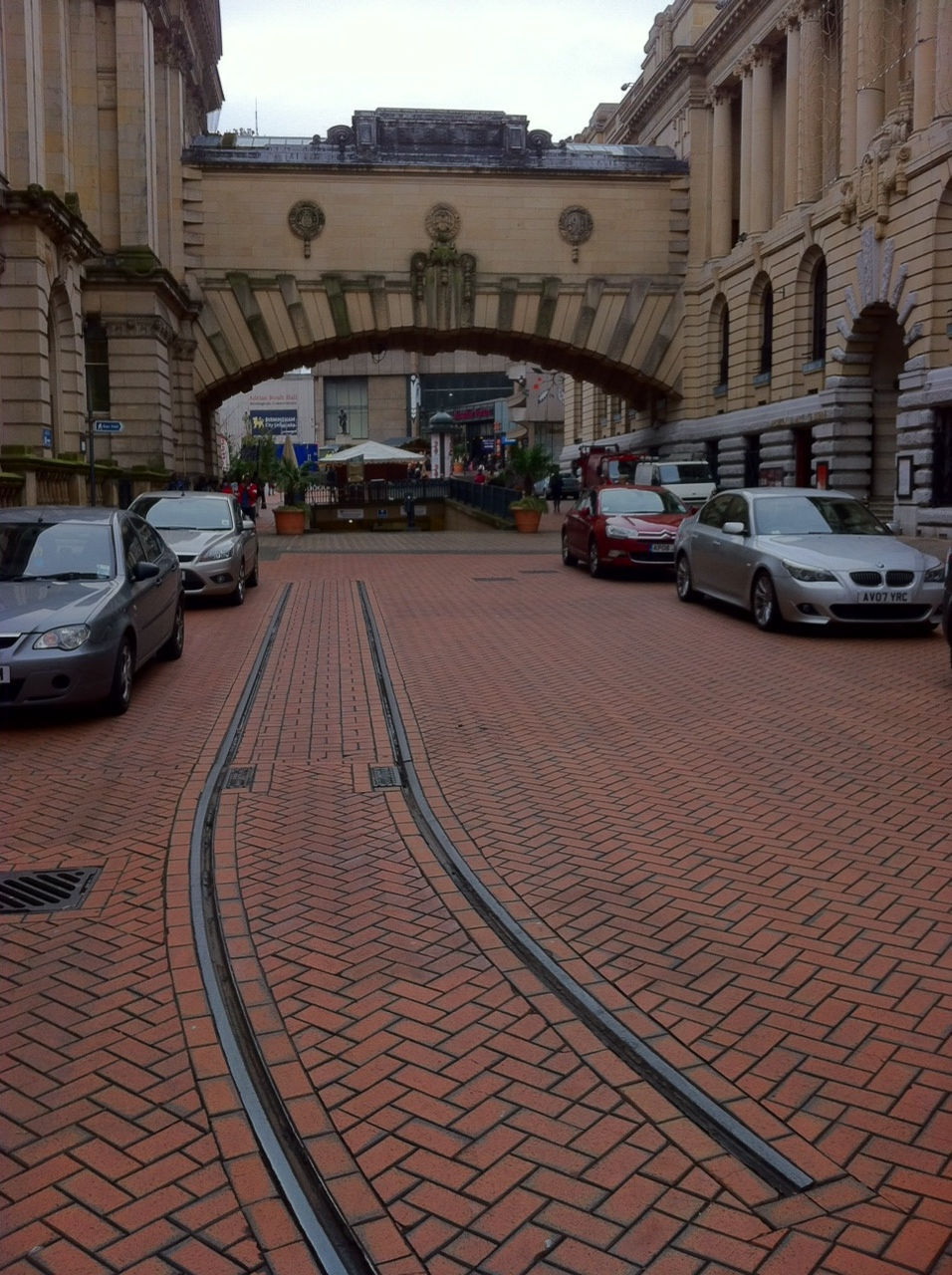
Remains of tram track in Edmund Street, Birmingham, with modern block paving

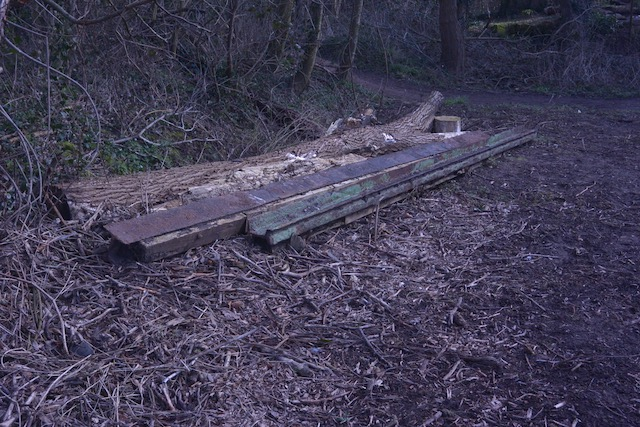
Tram track in Manor Farm Park (formerly Northfield Manor House grounds), Selly Oak.

== See also ==
- History of Birmingham
- Transport in Birmingham
- Trolleybuses in Birmingham
- West Midlands Metro
- List of town tramway systems in the United Kingdom
