= Trolleybuses in Birmingham =

Birmingham trolleybus system

Operation
- Locale: Birmingham, West Midlands, England
- Open: 27 November 1922
- Close: 30 June 1951
- Status: Closed
- Routes: 5
- Operators: Birmingham Corporation Tramways (to 1927); Birmingham Corporation Tramway and Omnibus Department (1927–1937); Birmingham City Transport (1937–1951)

Infrastructure
- Stock: 78 (maximum)

The Birmingham trolleybus system once served the city of Birmingham in England. Opened on 27 November 1922, it supplemented Birmingham's original tramway network.

By the standards of the various now-defunct trolleybus systems in the United Kingdom, the Birmingham system was a medium-sized one, even though Birmingham was then, and still is, the most populous British city outside London. With a total of only five routes, and a maximum fleet of 78 trolleybuses, it was closed relatively early, on 30 June 1951.

None of the former Birmingham trolleybuses is recorded as having survived.

== See also ==
- History of Birmingham
- Transport in Birmingham
- List of trolleybus systems in the United Kingdom
