= Hockley Tunnels =

Railway tunnels in Hockley, Birmingham, UK

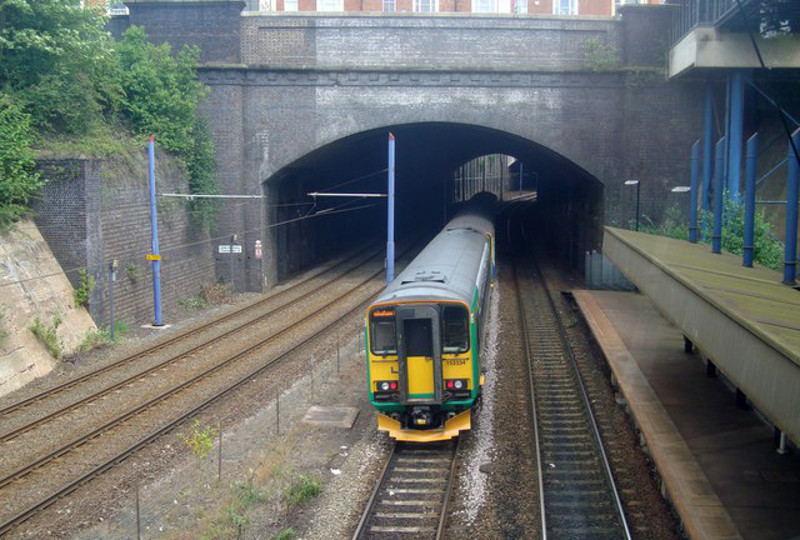
A train enters Hockley No 2 Tunnel from Jewellery Quarter station. The tram tracks are to the left

Hockley Tunnels are two tunnels used by the railway and tram in Hockley, Birmingham, England. Tunnel No. 1 is 136 yards (124 m) long and Tunnel No. 2 is 160 yards (150 m) long.

== History ==
The tunnels were built by the Great Western Railway on the line between Snow Hill station in Birmingham and Wolverhampton Low Level station in Wolverhampton, and were two of the three tunnels on that route, the other being Black Lake Tunnel. The Snow Hill to Wolverhampton line was opened on 14 November 1854.

At first, the tunnels carried two mixed-gauge tracks. In 1908-9 they were widened and two additional tracks were laid parallel to and south of the original lines and were designated as "relief", the original tracks becoming the "main" lines.

The tunnels became disused with the closure of Snow Hill station in March 1972.

== Present ==
On 24 September 1995, services north to Smethwick and onwards to Worcester were resumed. The first day also saw steam-hauled special trains, to Stourbridge Junction.

In 1999 the line to Wolverhampton was re-opened as a light-rail (tram) line, the Midland Metro (since rebranded as the West Midlands Metro), with the addition of overhead electrification. There are tram stops at either end of the pair of tunnels, Jewellery Quarter to the north, and St Paul's to the south.

The north, Metro side of the tunnels is illuminated, to enable tram drivers to see the track ahead. The West Midlands Metro stops at tram stops built over former railway stations. Soho & Winson Green railway station is now Soho (Benson Road) and Handsworth & Smethwick railway station is Handsworth (Booth St) while The Hawthorns remains the same name.

== Coordinates ==
Point	Coordinates
West Tunnel, west portal	52.48958°N 1.91281°W
West Tunnel, east portal	52.48919°N 1.91078°W
Midpoint	52.48899°N 1.91051°W
East Tunnel, west portal	52.48894°N 1.90977°W
East Tunnel, east portal	52.48840°N 1.90821°W
