= Handsworth and Smethwick railway station =

Former railway station in England

Handsworth and Smethwick
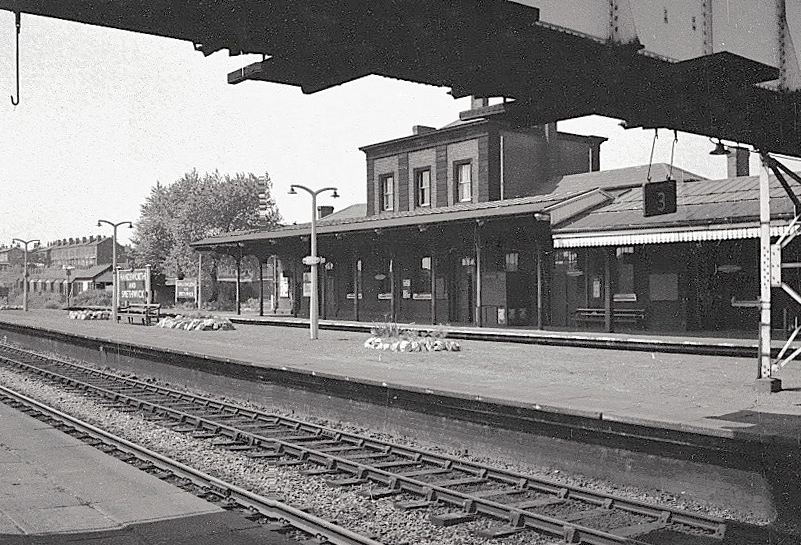
- May 1967

General information
- Location: Handsworth, City of Birmingham; England
- Coordinates: 52.5022°N 1.9530°W
- Grid reference: SP033893
- Platforms: 4

Other information
- Status: Disused

History
- Original company: Great Western Railway (Birmingham, Wolverhampton and Dudley Railway)
- Pre-grouping: Great Western Railway
- Post-grouping: Great Western Railway

Key dates
- 14 November 1854: Opened as Handsworth and Smethwick
- 6 March 1972: Closed
- 1999: Reopened as Handsworth, Booth Street
Location

Handsworth & Smethwick was an intermediate station on the Great Western Railway's London Paddington to Birkenhead via Birmingham Snow Hill line. It was opened in 1854.

The station's architecture was reminiscent of that of other stations and was almost exactly the same as Wednesbury and West Bromwich stations.

The station closed in 1972, with the line and much of the site has been demolished.

== Site today ==
In 1999, Handsworth Booth Street tram stop was opened on the site of the station, as part of the Midland Metro line. The only signs of the original building are the station toilets, whose doorways are blocked up, on Booth Street.

== Image gallery ==
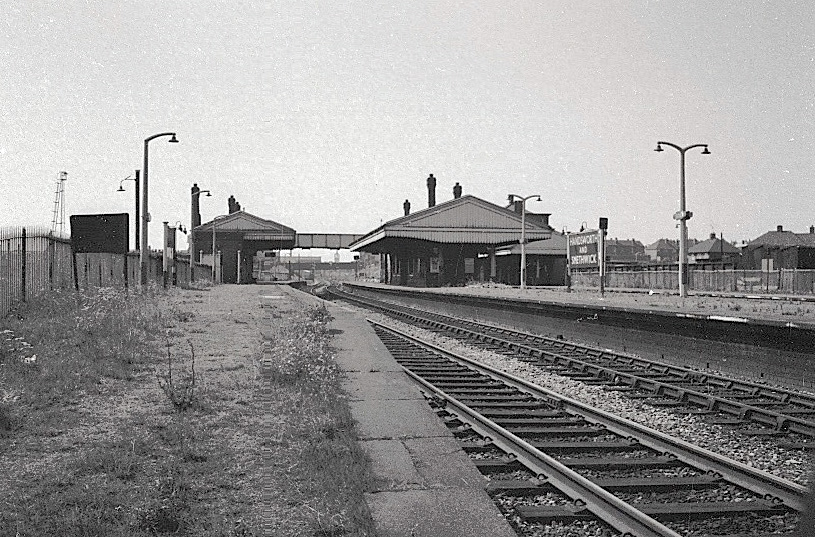
March 1967

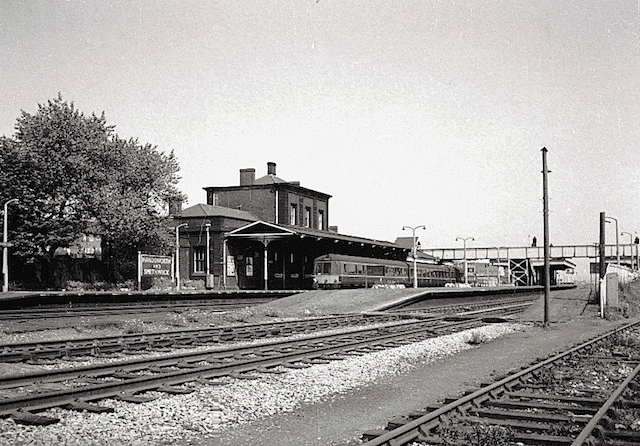
March 1967

| Preceding station | Historical railways | Following station |
|---|---|---|
| The Hawthorns; Line and station open | Great Western Railway; Birmingham–Wolverhampton (1854-1972) | Soho and Winson Green; Line open, station closed |
