= Hockley railway station =

Hockley railway station may refer to:

- Hockley railway station (Essex)
- Hockley railway station (West Midlands), which closed in 1972
