= Black Lake Tunnel =

Railway tunnel in the English Midlands

Black Lake Tunnel is a 412-yard railway tunnel on the West Bromwich and Wednesbury border, in England.

== Past ==
The tunnel was built by the Great Western Railway for trains travelling between Snow Hill station in Birmingham and Low Level station in Wolverhampton, and was one of two tunnels on that route, the other being Hockley Tunnel.

The next stops after the Black Lake tunnel northbound was Wednesbury and Southbound was Swan Village, West Bromwich Central.

The line that the tunnel was on closed in March 1972.

== Present ==
In 1999, the line to Wolverhampton was re-opened as a light-rail (tram) line, the Midland Metro, with the addition of overhead electrification. There are tram stops at either end of the pair of tunnels

The Metro side of the tunnel is illuminated, to enable tram drivers to see the track ahead. The next stop northbound is Wednesbury Great Western Street tram stop, this used to be GWR Wednesbury Central Station. Southbound is Black Lake tram stop.

== Location ==
The tunnel runs under open ground, and New Street, near its junction with the appropriately named Tunnel Road.

=== Coordinates ===
Point	Coordinates
North portal	52.53872°N 2.01588°W
Approx. midpoint	52.53719°N 2.01485°W
South portal	52.53564°N 2.01371°W
