= Bilston Central railway station =

Disused railway station in Bilston, Wolverhampton

Bilston Central
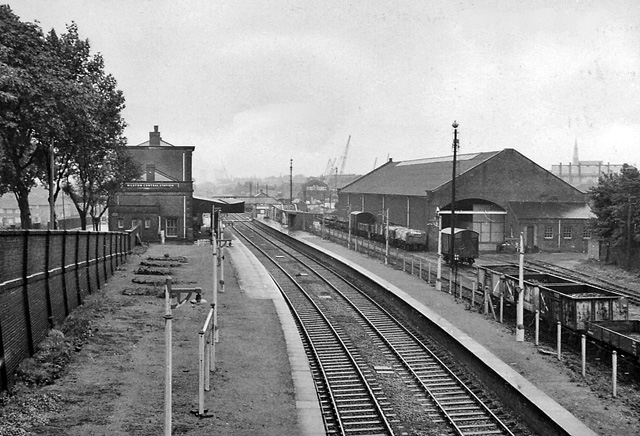
- The station before closure in 1962

General information
- Location: Bilston, Wolverhampton; England
- Coordinates: 52.5646°N 2.0729°W
- Grid reference: SO951963

Other information
- Status: Disused

History
- Original company: Great Western Railway
- Pre-grouping: Great Western Railway
- Post-grouping: Great Western Railway

Key dates
- 14 November 1854: Opened
- 4 March 1972: Closed to passengers
- 6 March 1972: Closed
Location

Bilston Central railway station was a station on the London Paddington to Birkenhead via Birmingham Snow Hill line. It was built in 1854 and served the town of Bilston in the West Midlands. It closed in 1972, with the end of passenger services on the Snow Hill and the line to Wolverhampton, although goods trains continued to pass through the site of the station until this section of the line was closed in January 1983. It saw a second incarnation when a Midland Metro stop of the same name was opened a few hundred yards away in May 1999.

== Gallery ==
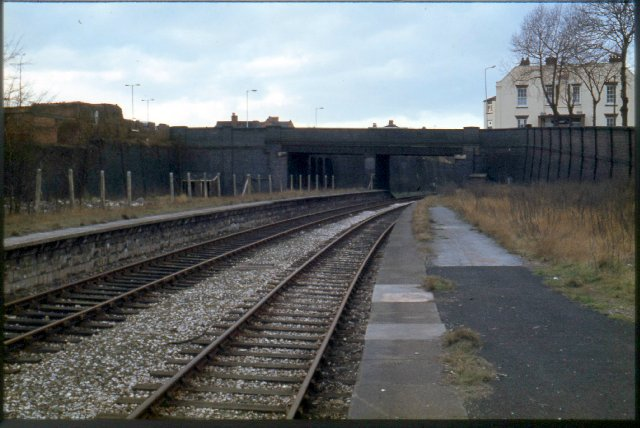
The station after closure in 1978

Preceding station	Disused railways	Following station
Priestfield; Line and station closed	Great Western Railway; Birmingham-Wolverhampton (1854–1972)	Bradley and Moxley; Line and station closed
