= Hockley railway station (West Midlands) =

Former railway station in England

Hockley
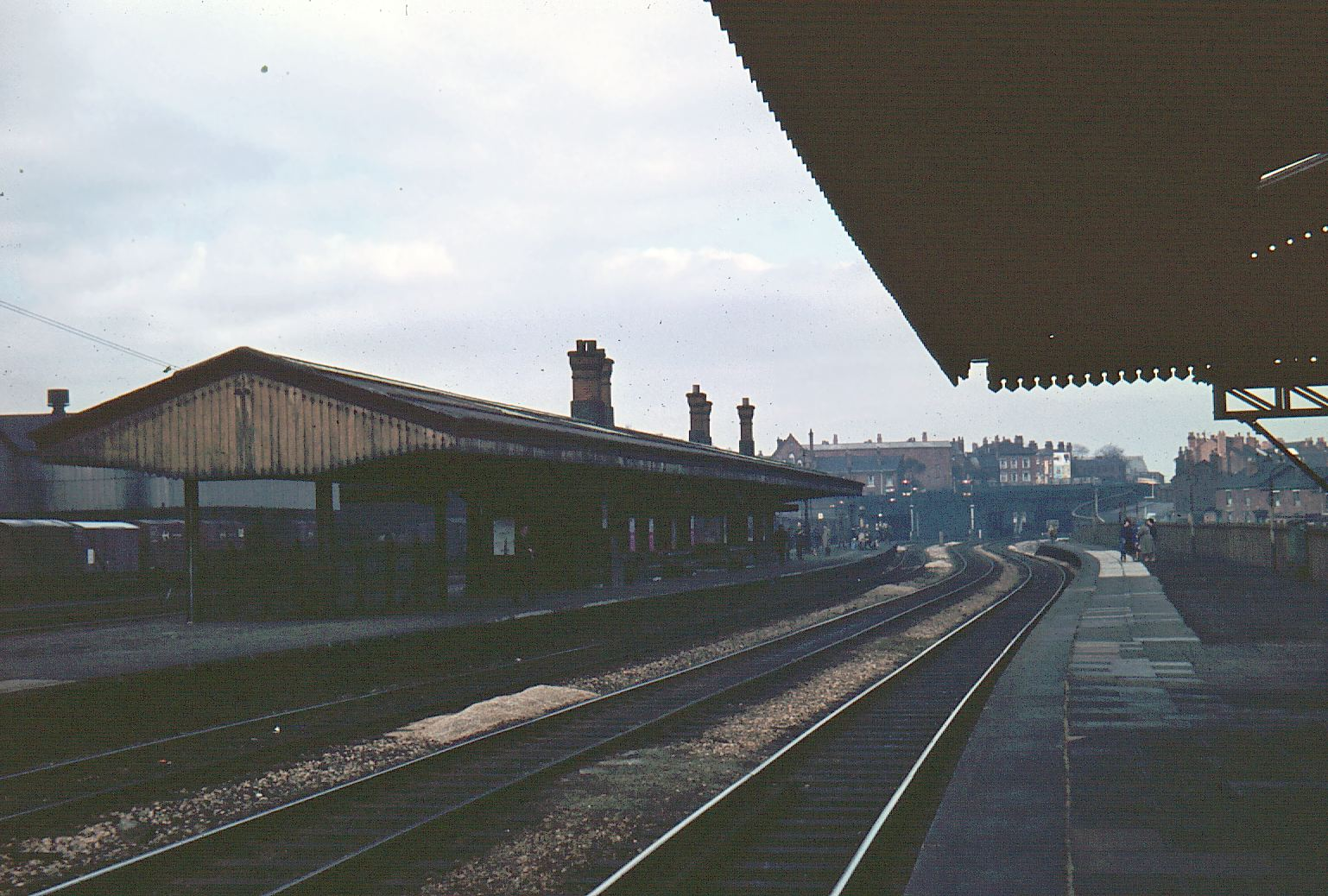
- Hockley station in 1967

General information
- Location: Hockley, Birmingham; England
- Coordinates: 52.4907°N 1.9177°W
- Grid reference: SP056880
- Platforms: 4

Other information
- Status: Disused

History
- Pre-grouping: Great Western Railway
- Post-grouping: Great Western Railway

Key dates
- 1854: Opened
- 1972: Closed
- 1995: Jewellery Quarter station opened a short distance east
Location

Hockley was an intermediate station on the Great Western Railway's London Paddington to Birkenhead via Birmingham Snow Hill line in England, serving the Hockley area of Birmingham. It was located approximately one mile from Snow Hill station. Opened in 1854, the station remained operational throughout the original life of the line, eventually closing alongside the line in 1972.

The station featured two bay platforms and one island platform. Passenger access to the island platform was only available via an underground passage.

== Replacement ==
When the Jewellery line was reopened in 1995, Hockley station was not reinstated. However, a new station, Jewellery Quarter station, was opened approximately 100 yards (91 m) to the east, near the entrance of Hockley No. 2 Tunnel on the other side of Icknield Street.

Little trace now remains of the original Hockley station, as the site was cleared in the 1990s when the line was reopened.

As well as the Jewellery line, the trackbed is now used by the West Midlands Metro.

== Image gallery ==
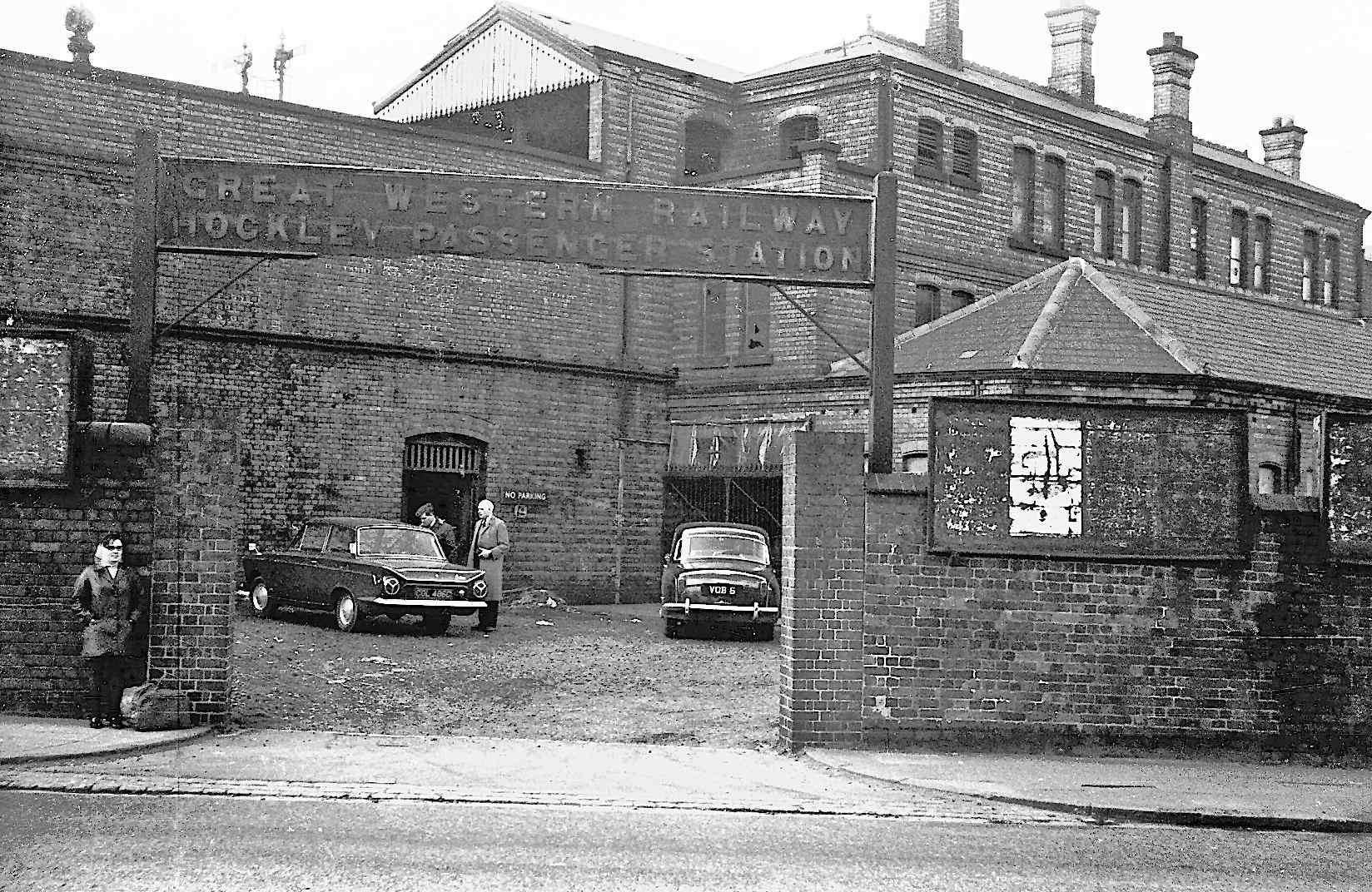
Hockley station exterior, March 1967

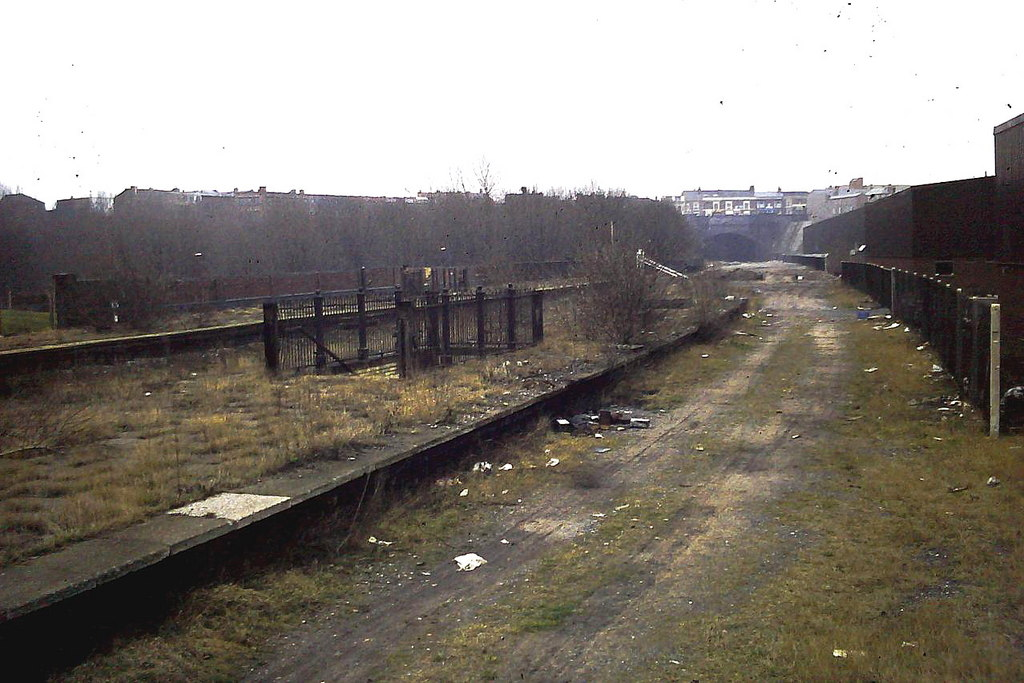
The remains of the station in the 1980s after closure. The tunnel in the background is the site of the present Jewellery Quarter station.

== Hockley goods depot ==
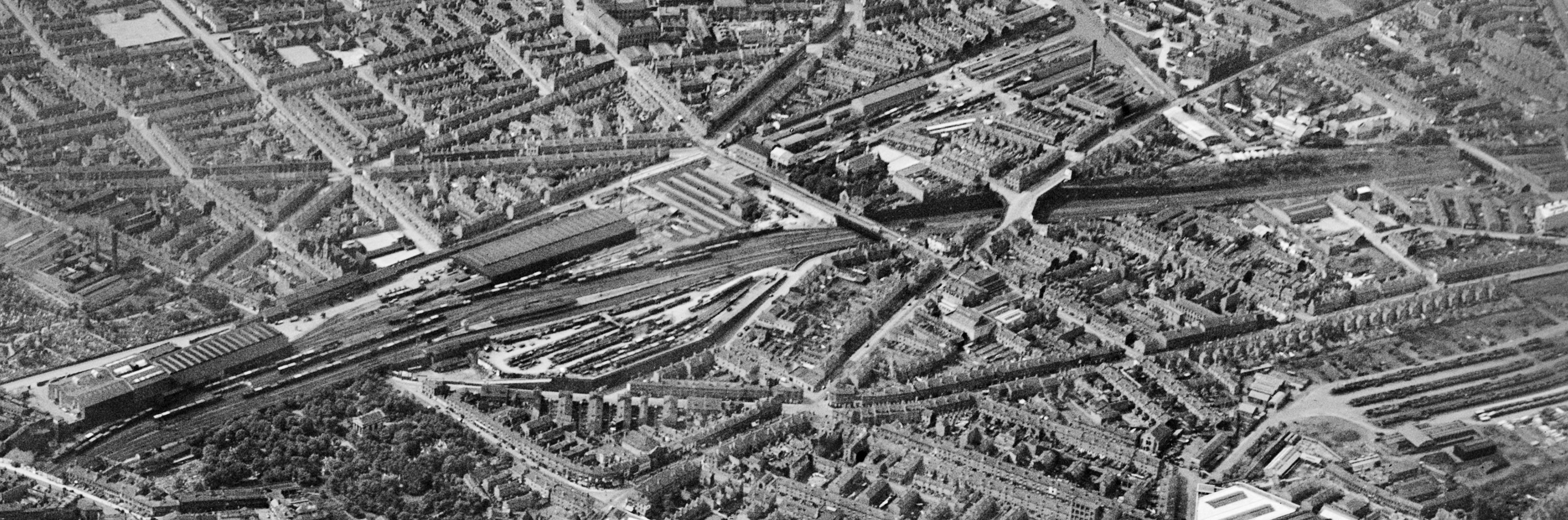
1939 aerial photograph showing the goods depot, with the passenger platform at its center. The canal interchange is at the top right.

Between 1854 and 1967, a large goods depot was situated alongside Hockley station. It served as the Great Western Railway's principal goods depot for the Birmingham area. The depot measured three-quarters of a mile in length and was two to three hundred yards wide. At its western end, it featured a transshipment interchange with barges on the Soho Loop of the Birmingham Canal. In the 1920s, the depot employed over one thousand permanent staff.

Preceding station	Historical railways	Following station
Soho and Winson Green	Great Western Railway; Birmingham–Wolverhampton (1854–1972)	Birmingham Snow Hill
