= Jewellery Quarter station =

Railway station and tram stop in Birmingham, England

Jewellery Quarter
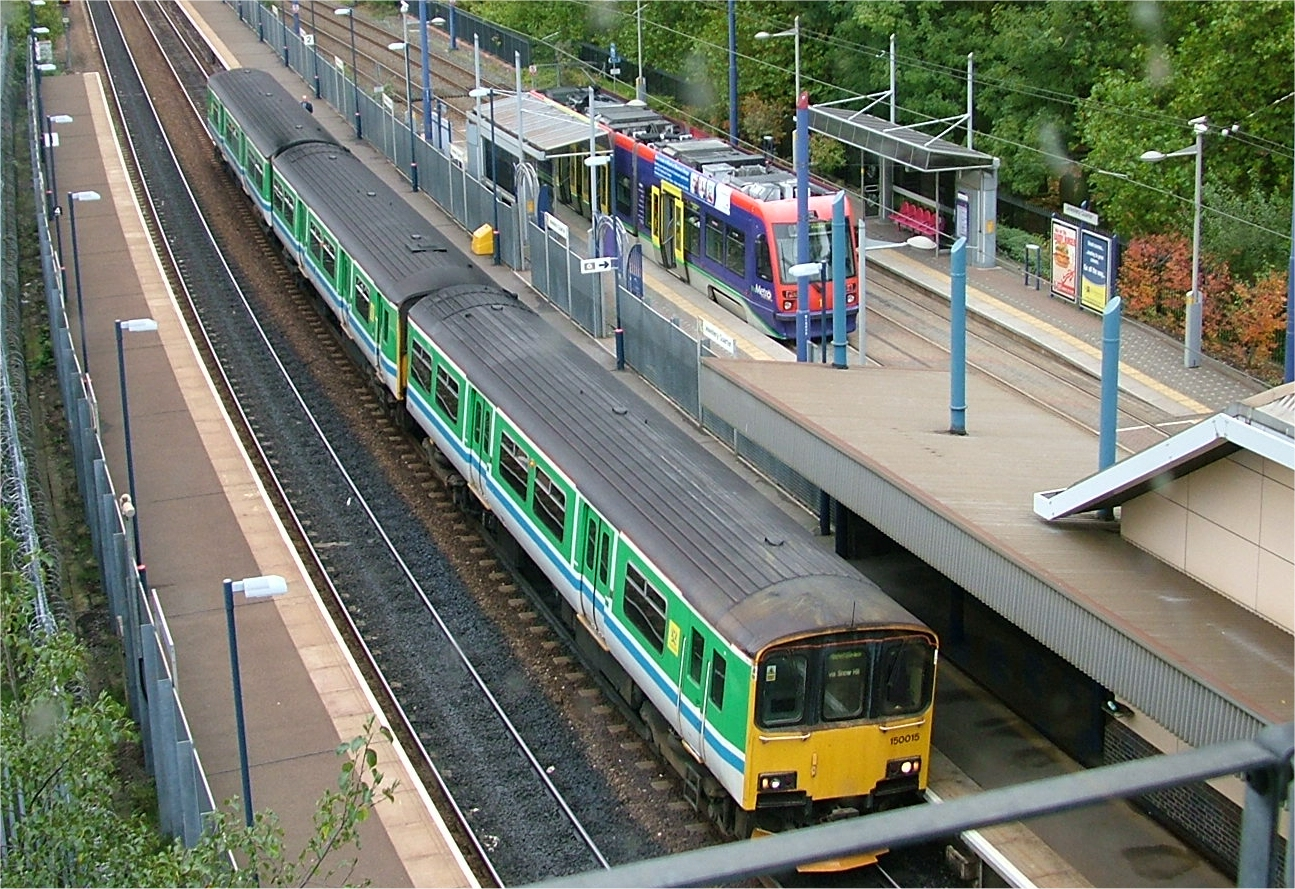
- Train and tram at Jewellery Quarter station in 2005

General information
- Location: Jewellery Quarter, Birmingham; England
- Coordinates: 52.4897°N 1.9136°W
- Grid reference: SP059879
- Manager: West Midlands Trains
- Transit authority: Transport for West Midlands
- Platforms: 2

Other information
- Station code: JEQ
- Fare zone: 1
- Classification: DfT category E

Key dates
- 24 September 1995: Opened

Passengers
- 2021/22: ▲0.284 million
- 2022/23: ▲0.321 million
- 2023/24: ▲0.399 million
- 2024/25: ▲0.446 million
- 2025/26: ▲0.470 million
Location
Notes
- Passenger statistics from the Office of Rail and Road

Jewellery Quarter
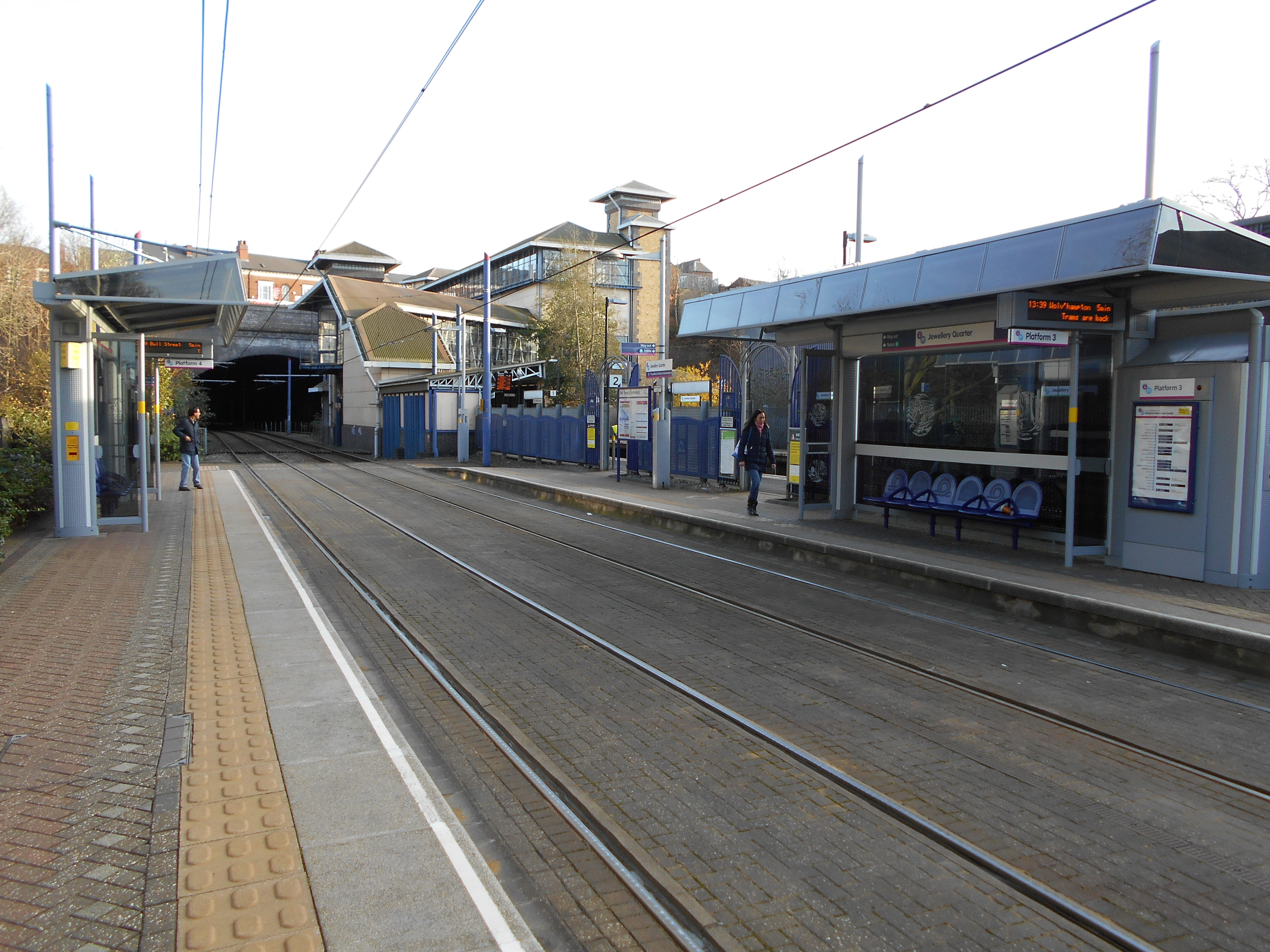
- West Midlands Metro platforms, looking towards Birmingham.

General information
- Location: Jewellery Quarter; Birmingham; England
- System: West Midlands Metro tram stop
- Line: Line 1 (Edgbaston Village/Millennium Point – Wolverhampton St George's/Wolverhampton Station)
- Platforms: 2

History
- Opened: 31 May 1999

Passengers
- 2015/16: Approx. 900 daily
Location

Jewellery Quarter station is a combined railway station and tram stop, situated in the Jewellery Quarter of Birmingham, England. The station is served by West Midlands Trains (who operate the station), Chiltern Railways, and West Midlands Metro.

The station is set at the mouth of Hockley No 2 Tunnel below the elevation of its road-level access point on Vyse Street; stairs and a lift are provided.

== History ==
Jewellery Quarter station was opened on 24 September 1995, as part of the "Jewellery Line" project which saw the re-introduction of cross-city services via Birmingham Snow Hill. Midland Metro services commenced in 1999, when its first (and so far only) line from Birmingham to Wolverhampton opened.

No previous station had existed at this site, however the area was historically served by Hockley station, located a short distance west, which had been opened by the Great Western Railway in 1854, and was closed with the line in 1972.

== Facilities ==
The station has no car park, but ten cycle storage spaces are available. The station has a ticket office, but this has limited opening hours; a self-service ticket machine is provided for use when the ticket hall is closed and for collecting pre-paid tickets. Train running information is offered via automated announcements, CIS displays, timetable posters and customer help points on each side.

Outside the station entrance on Vyse Street is a sculpture called "Clockwork" by Mark Renn, which dates from 2004. There is also a Victorian cast iron public urinal, dating from around 1880, which is now disused but is grade II listed.

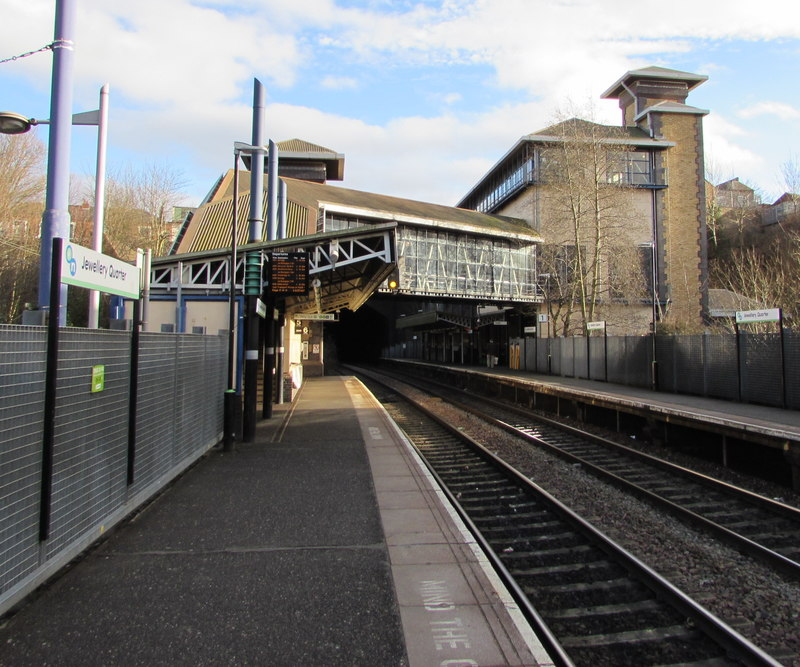
View east from the railway platform towards station buildings.

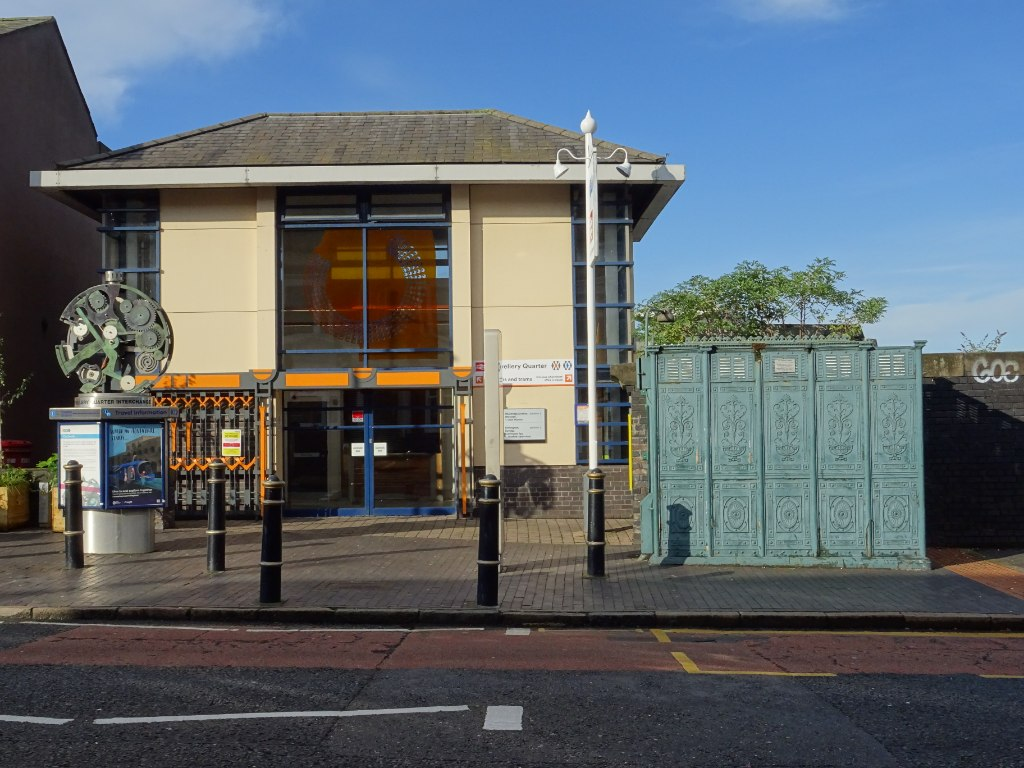
The station frontage on Vyse Street, with to the right a grade II listed cast-iron urinal.

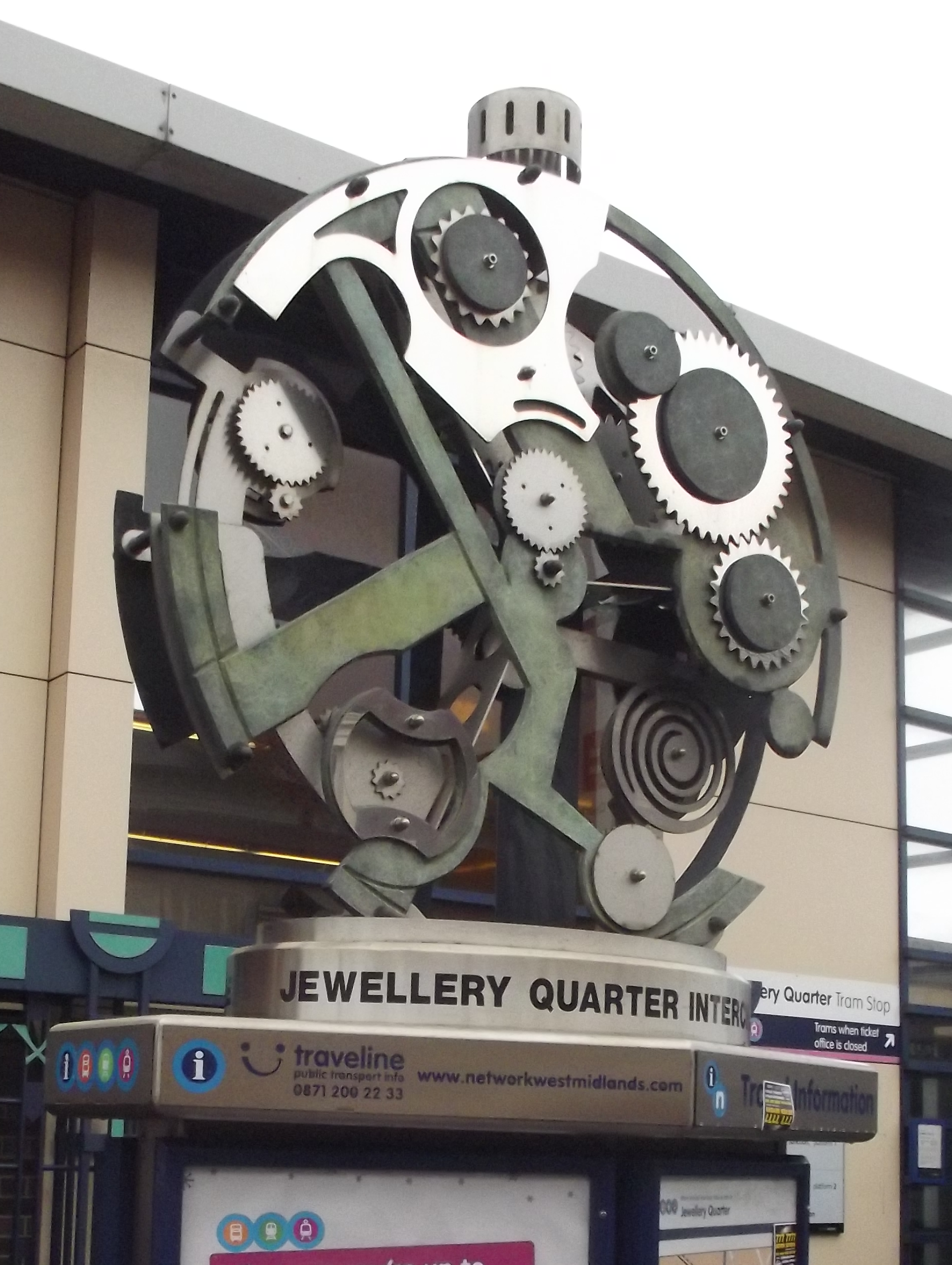
"Clockwork" sculpture outside the station entrance.

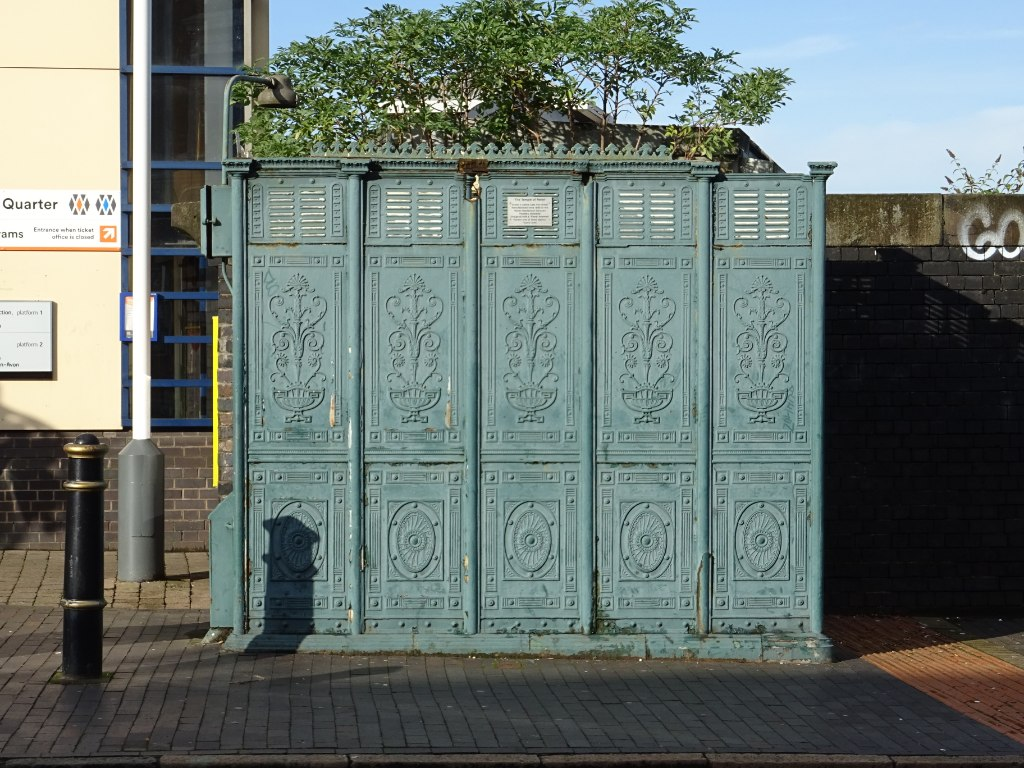
The former cast iron public urinal outside the station entrance

== Services ==
=== Train ===
West Midlands Railway:

Most services are operated by West Midlands Trains.

The Monday to Saturday off-peak service sees trains approximately every 15 minutes in each direction.

Eastbound:

- 4 trains per hour (tph) to Birmingham Snow Hill and Birmingham Moor Street
  - 2tph to Whitlocks End via Shirley
    - of which one continues to Stratford-upon-Avon via the North Warwickshire Line
  - 2tph to Dorridge via Solihull
    - of which one continues to Stratford-upon-Avon via Lapworth
      - Two evening weekday West Midlands Railway services continue to Leamington Spa.

Westbound:

- 4 trains per hour to Kidderminster via Smethwick Galton Bridge and Stourbridge Junction:
  - of which two continue to Worcester Foregate Street via Droitwich Spa
  - Some services reverse or terminate at Worcester Shrub Hill.

Chiltern Railways:

Chiltern serve the station with one nighttime service to Stourbridge Junction on weekdays only, from London Marylebone.

=== Tram ===
On Mondays to Fridays, West Midlands Metro services in each direction between Edgbaston Village and Wolverhampton St George's/Wolverhampton Station run at six to eight-minute intervals during the day, and at fifteen-minute intervals during the evenings and on Sundays. They run at eight minute intervals on Saturdays.

From 5 April 2026, some southbound services run to a temporary terminus at Millennium Point, on the yet-to-be completed new line to Digbeth.

Preceding station	West Midlands Metro	Following station
Soho Benson Road	Line 1	St Paul's
	National Rail	
The Hawthorns	West Midlands Railway; Birmingham-Worcester via Kidderminster	Birmingham Snow Hill
The Hawthorns	Chiltern Railways; London-Kidderminster	Birmingham Snow Hill

== See also ==
- Transport in Birmingham
- List of Midland Metro stations
