= Priestfield railway station =

Former railway station in England

Priestfield
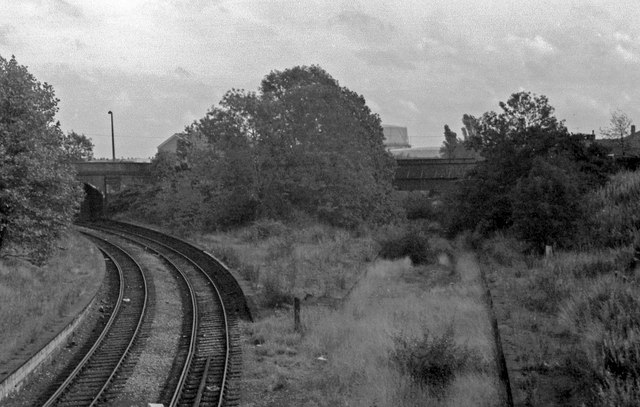
- The derelict remains of the station in 1978

General information
- Location: Priestfield, Wolverhampton; England
- Coordinates: 52.5705°N 2.0964°W
- Grid reference: SO935969
- Platforms: 4

Other information
- Status: Disused

History
- Original company: Oxford, Worcester and Wolverhampton Railway
- Pre-grouping: Great Western Railway
- Post-grouping: Great Western Railway

Key dates
- 5 July 1854: Opened
- 1962: Oxford, Worcester and Wolverhampton Railway closed to passengers.
- 4 March 1972: Snow Hill - Low Level Line closed to passengers.
Location

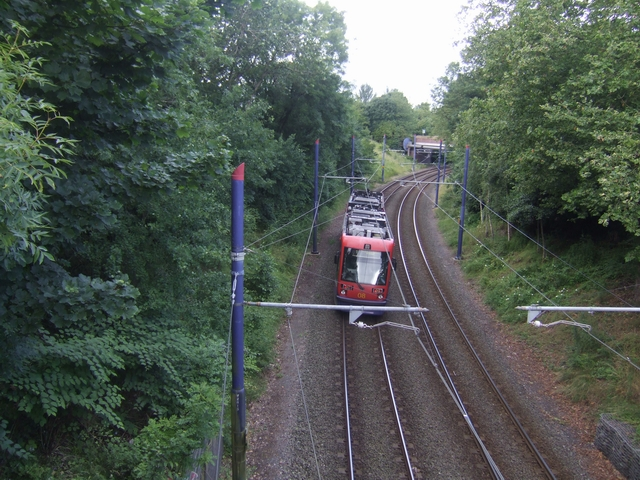
Wolverhampton bound tram at site of the former Priestfield railway Station

Priestfield railway station was a junction station built by the Oxford, Worcester and Wolverhampton Railway in 1854. It was situated on the junction of the Oxford-Worcester-Wolverhampton Line and the London Paddington to Birkenhead via Birmingham Snow Hill. The station closed in 1972, although mainline services were withdrawn by 1967, and only single railcars operated to Snow Hill, the OWW Line closing in 1962. It was the first station south of Wolverhampton Low Level. After the withdrawal of passenger services, the line remained open to goods trains until December 1982.

Today, Priestfield refers to the Midland Metro stop a short distance away from the station's original position. The tram line opened on 31 May 1999, restoring the use of the line after more than 16 years in disuse and to serve the Snow Hill-Low Level Line while the Dudley-Wolverhampton Line has been since built on and redeveloped. However the location of the former railway junction can be detected by a distinct gap in the right-hand embankment as the Metro line turns under the adjacent road bridge.

Preceding station	Disused railways	Following station
Wolverhampton Low Level	Great Western Railway; Birmingham-Wolverhampton (1854-1972)	Bilston Central
Wolverhampton Low Level	Oxford, Worcester and Wolverhampton Railway; Later Great Western Railway, then British Rail; Oxford-Worcester-Wolverhampton (1852-1962)	Bilston West
