= Bradley and Moxley railway station =

Disused railway station in England

Bradley and Moxley
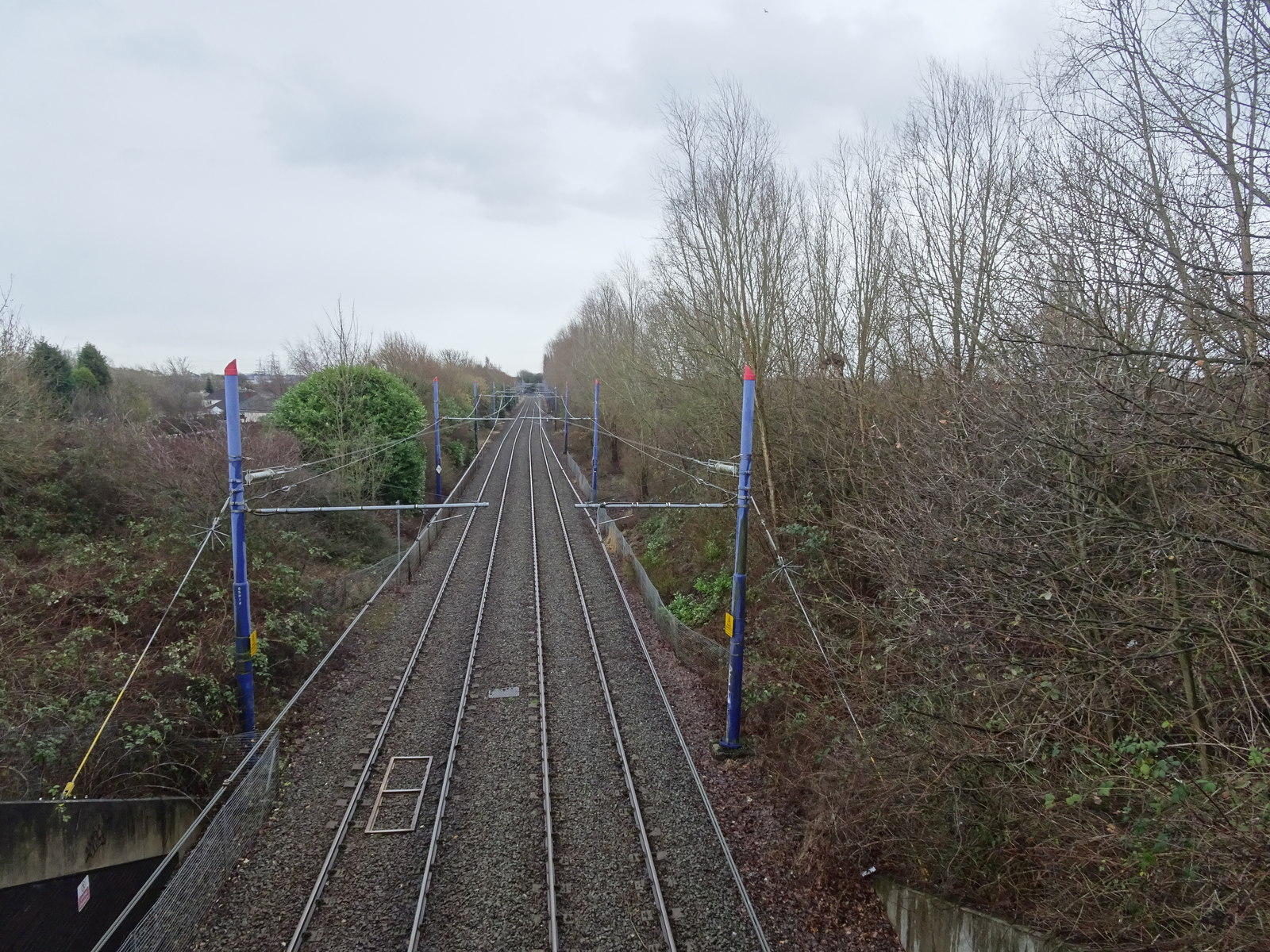
- The site of the station in 2018

General information
- Location: Bradley, Wolverhampton; England
- Coordinates: 52.5546°N 2.0555°W
- Grid reference: SO963952
- Platforms: 2

Other information
- Status: Disused

History
- Original company: Great Western Railway
- Pre-grouping: Great Western Railway

Key dates
- 1862: Station opened
- 1 May 1915: Station closed
Location

Bradley and Moxley railway station was a station on the Great Western Railway's London Paddington to Birkenhead via Birmingham Snow Hill line. It was opened in 1862 and served the village of Bradley in Wolverhampton and Moxley area of Darlaston in the West Midlands, England. It closed on 1 May 1915, with the coming of the First World War. Due to poor patronage, it didn't reopen following the end of hostilities. A Midland Metro station was opened at Bradley Lane nearby in 1999.

Preceding station	Disused railways	Following station
Bilston Central; Line and station closed	Great Western Railway; Birmingham-Wolverhampton (1862–1915)	Wednesbury Central; Line and station closed
