= Swan Village railway station =

Former railway station in England

Swan Village
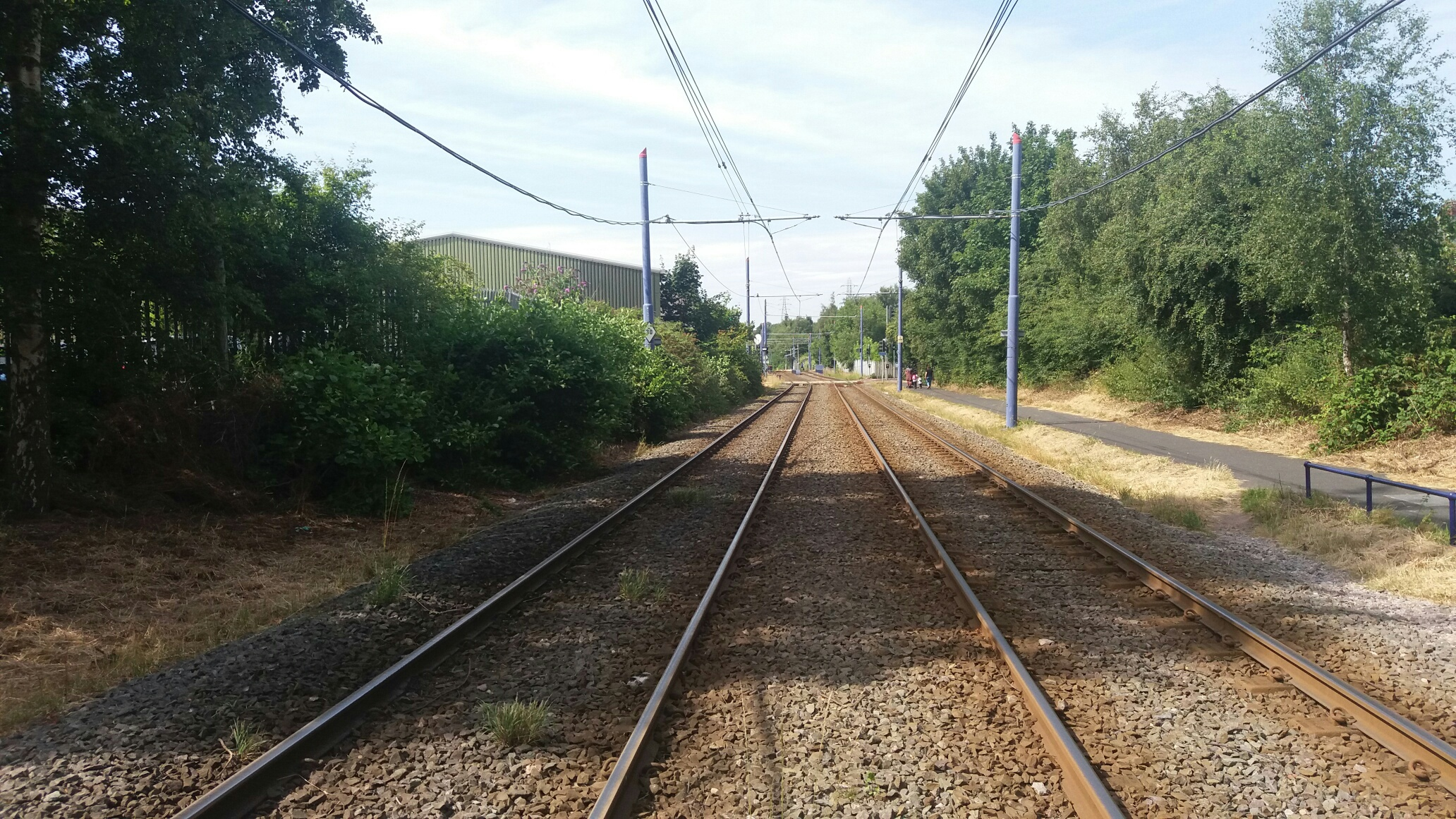
- The site of the station in 2017

General information
- Location: Swan Village, Sandwell; England
- Coordinates: 52.5284°N 2.0101°W
- Grid reference: SO994922
- Platforms: 4

Other information
- Status: Disused

History
- Original company: Great Western Railway
- Pre-grouping: Great Western Railway
- Post-grouping: Great Western Railway

Key dates
- 1854: Opened
- 1972: Closed
Location

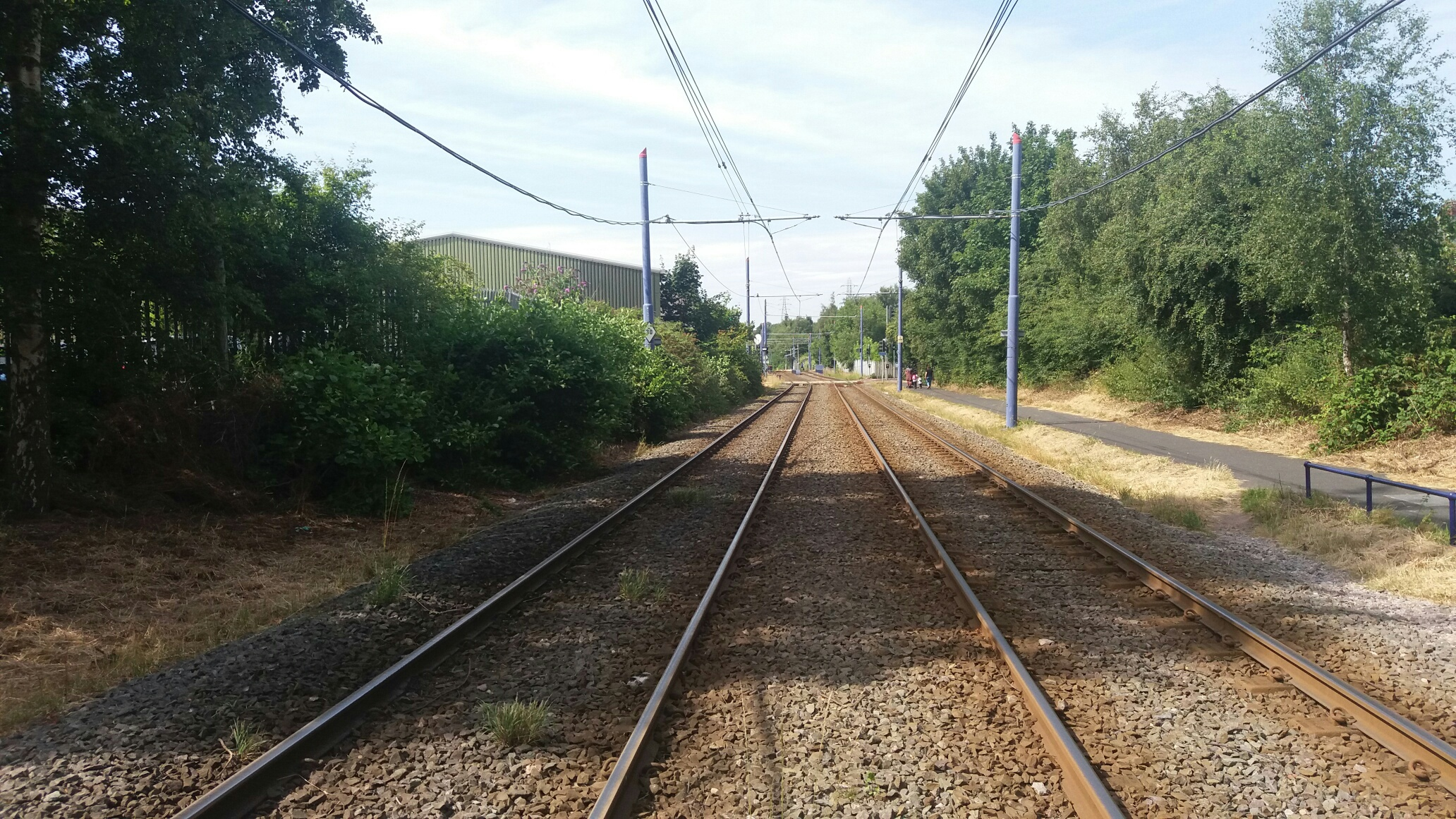
Swan Village former station site, now part of the Midland Metro

Swan Village railway station was a station on the Great Western Railway's London Paddington to Birkenhead via Birmingham Snow Hill line. It was opened in 1854. It was the junction station where the Dudley Branch of the line diverged from the main line. Its location is distinguished by the angled supports for the road bridge at the former station site.

The station was rebuilt between 1959 and 1961 to the designs of the British Rail Western Region architect Ray Moorcroft.

The Dudley branch closed in 1964 as part of the Beeching Axe, but Swan Village remained open until 1972 and the closure of the main line. A level crossing was situated at one end of the station, and Black Lake tram stop on the Midland Metro route is situated on the other side of this crossing.

Preceding station	Disused railways	Following station
Wednesbury Central	Great Western Railway; Birmingham-Wolverhampton (1854–1972)	West Bromwich
Great Bridge South	Great Western Railway; Birmingham-Wolverhampton Dudley Branch (1854–1964)	West Bromwich
