= Great Bridge South railway station =

Former railway station in the West Midlands, England

Great Bridge South
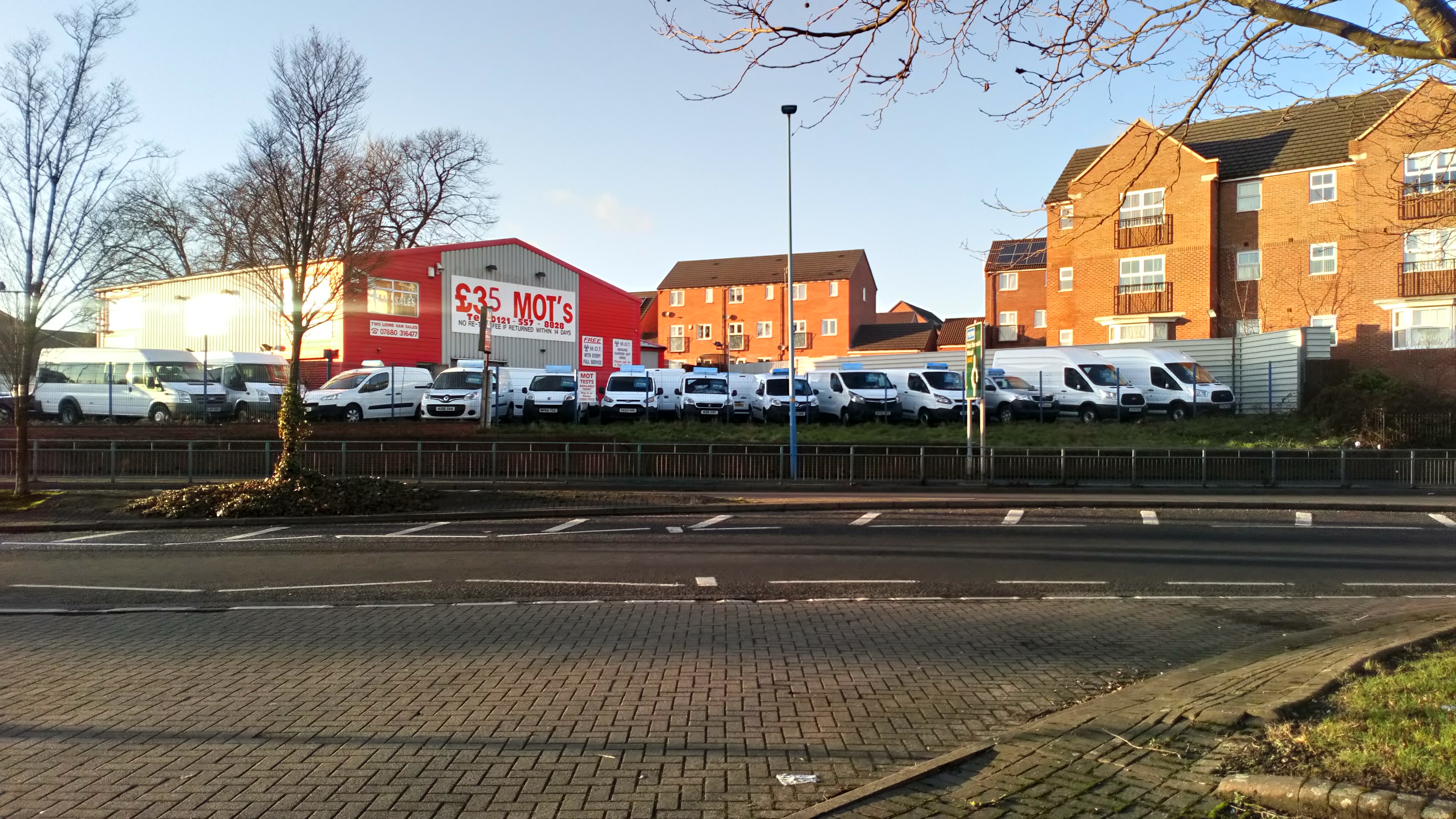
- The station site today

General information
- Location: Great Bridge, Sandwell; England
- Coordinates: 52.5311°N 2.0371°W
- Grid reference: SO975925

Other information
- Status: Disused

History
- Original company: Great Western Railway
- Pre-grouping: Great Western Railway
- Post-grouping: Great Western Railway

Key dates
- 1866: Opened as Great Bridge
- 1915: Closed
- 1920: Reopened
- 1950: Renamed as Great Bridge South
- 1964: Closed
Location

Great Bridge South railway station was a stop on a link between the South Staffordshire and the Birmingham Snow Hill-Wolverhampton Low Level lines. It served the village of Great Bridge and town of Tipton, in Staffordshire, England.

== History ==
The station was opened in 1866. As with many passenger stations, it closed during the years of the First World War but reopened in 1920.

Despite another station existing in Great Bridge from 1866, the station was not given the name of South until after nationalisation in 1950.

It remained operational until British Railways closed the station during the Beeching Axe in 1964.

Preceding station	Disused railways	Following station
Dudley Port	Great Western Railway; Birmingham-Wolverhampton-Dudley Branch (1852-1964)	Swan Village

== The site today ==
The line is now part of the metro extension to dudley
