= The Hawthorns station =

Railway station and tram stop in Smethwick, England

The Hawthorns
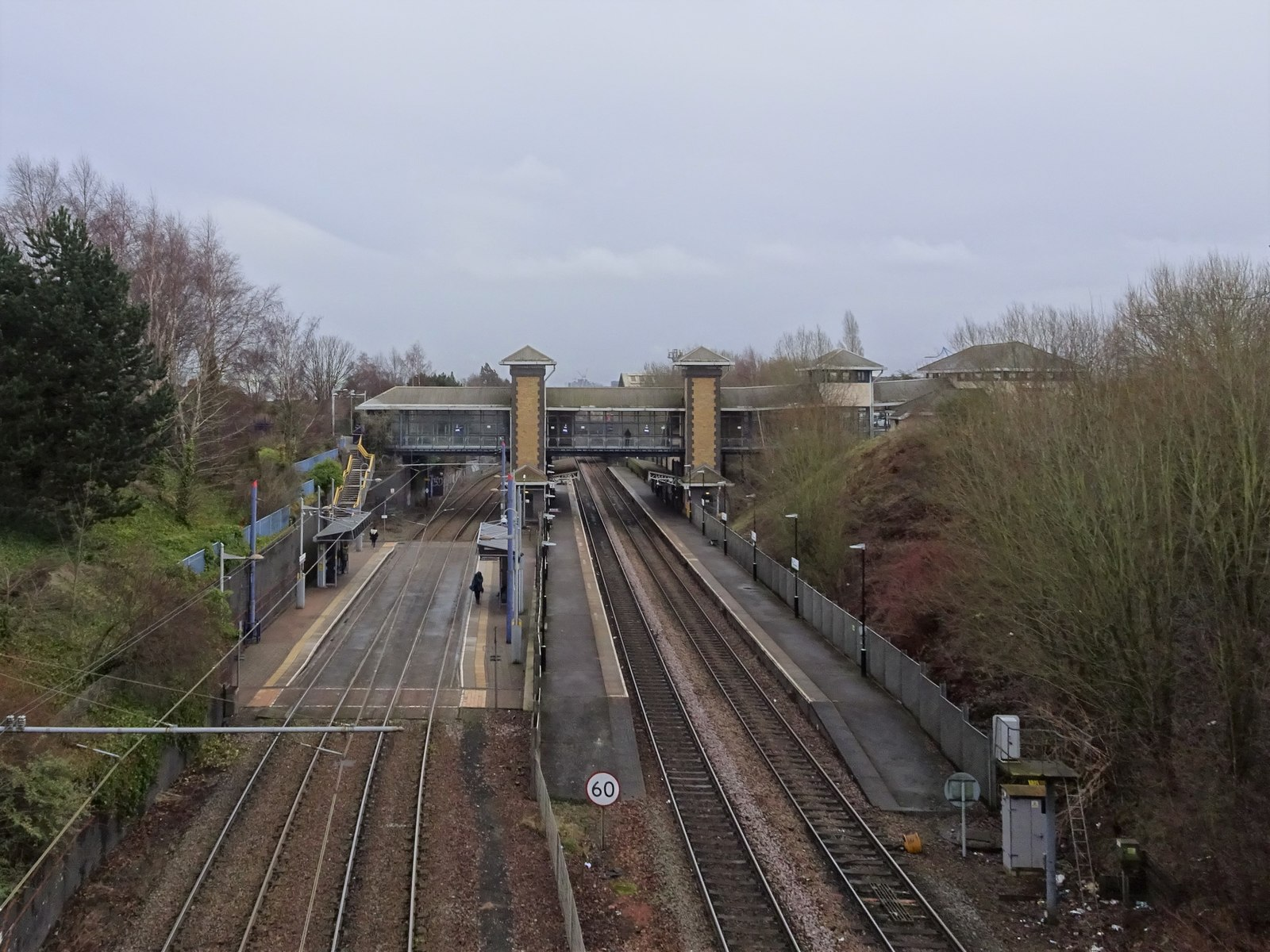
- The Hawthorns station: the West Midlands Metro platforms to the left, the railway platforms to the right.

General information
- Location: Smethwick, Sandwell; England
- Coordinates: 52.505°N 1.964°W
- Grid reference: SP025897
- Manager: West Midlands Trains
- Transit authority: Transport for West Midlands
- Platforms: 4; 2 (train) + 2 (tram)

Other information
- Station code: THW
- Fare zone: 2
- Classification: DfT category E

Key dates
- 1931: Opened as The Hawthorns Halt
- 27 April 1968: Closed
- 24 September 1995: Reopened as The Hawthorns

Passengers
- 2021/22: ▲0.225 million
- 2022/23: ▲0.266 million
- 2023/24: ▲0.284 million
- 2024/25: ▲0.334 million
- 2025/26: ▲0.356 million
Location
Notes
- Passenger statistics from the Office of Rail and Road

The Hawthorns
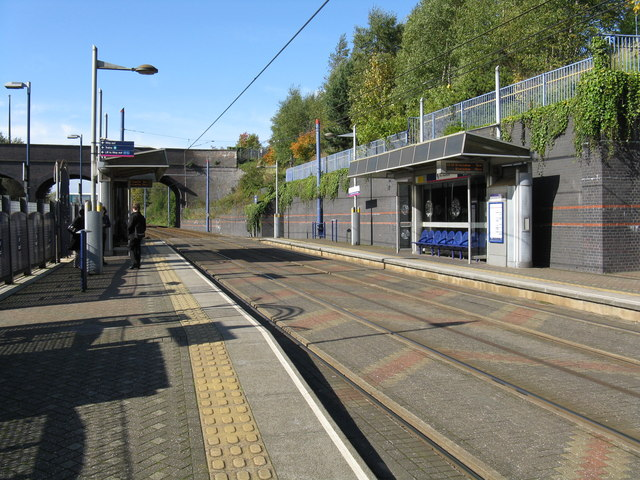
- West Midlands Metro platforms

General information
- Location: The Hawthorns, Smethwick; Sandwell; England
- System: West Midlands Metro tram stop
- Line: Line 1 (Edgbaston Village/Millennium Point – Wolverhampton St George's/Wolverhampton Station)
- Platforms: 2

History
- Opened: 1999

Passengers
- 2015/16: Approx. 1,100 daily
Location

The Hawthorns station is a railway station and tram stop, opened in 1995 in Smethwick, near Birmingham, West Midlands, England. The station shares its name with the local football ground, The Hawthorns, the home of West Bromwich Albion F.C., which it serves. There is a park and ride facility at the tram stop.

== History ==
Between 1931 and 1968, The Hawthorns Halt partly occupied the site of the current station, opened by the Great Western Railway on their London (Paddington) to Birkenhead via Birmingham (Snow Hill) line. It served football specials only, and had minimal facilities, as such it was not deemed worthy of 'station' status. It consisted of three platforms: platform 3 catering for return travel to Stourbridge, with platforms 1 and 2 being sited the other side of Halfords Lane.

The present station was opened in 1995, as part of the "Jewellery Line" project to restore services to Birmingham Snow Hill, this time it opened as a fully fledged station with regular services on the cross-city Snow Hill Lines. In 1999 the Midland Metro tram line opened between Birmingham and Wolverhampton, adding two tram platforms alongside the two railway platforms.

Its passenger numbers are assisted with free parking and its close proximity to Junction 1 of the M5. Pedestrian and vehicular access is via Halfords Lane.

Outside the main station entrance is a sculpture called "Aspire" by Anuradha Patel.

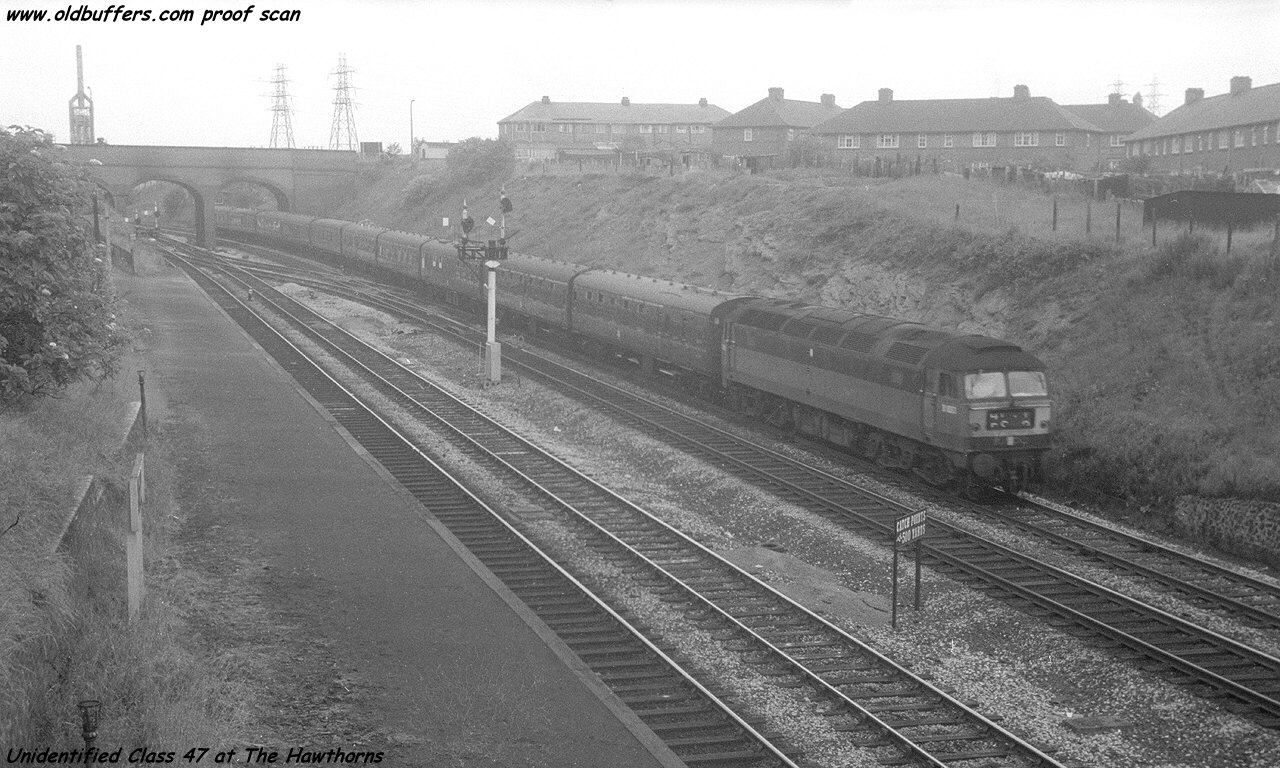
The original Hawthorns Halt in 1966

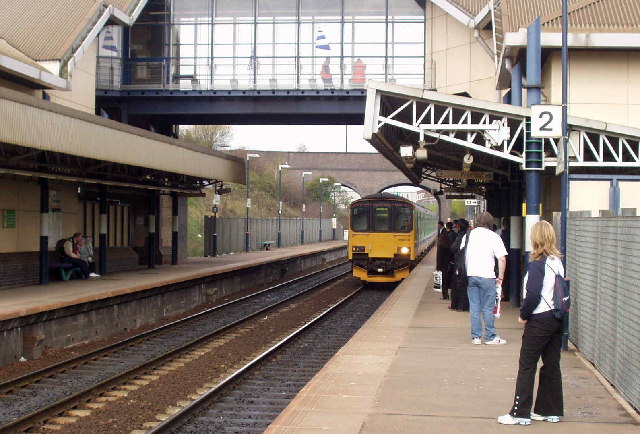
The railway platforms in 2004.

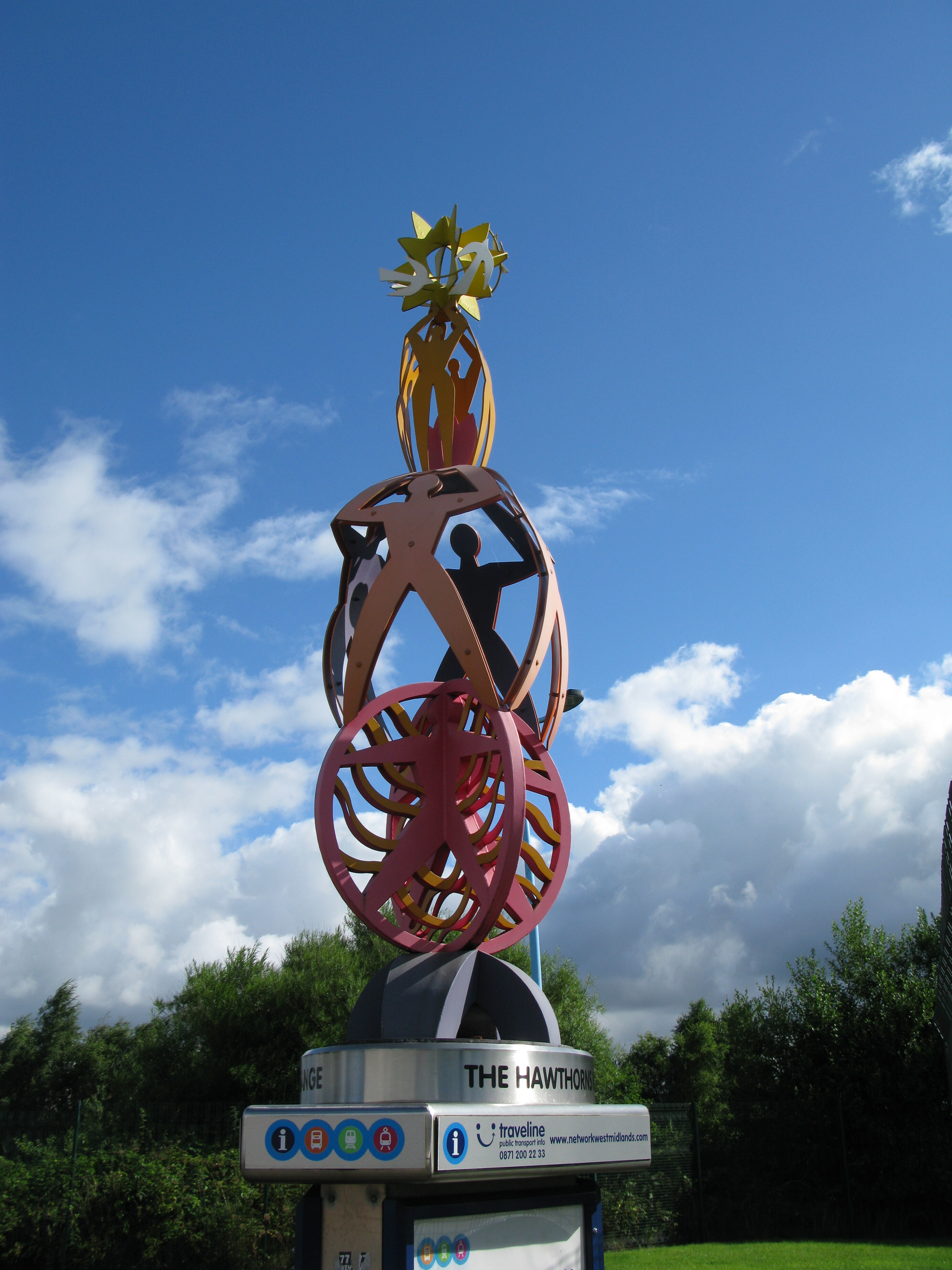
"Aspire" sculpture outside the station entrance

== Services ==
=== Train ===
Most trains are operated by West Midlands Railway. The Monday to Saturday daytime service sees four trains in per hour each direction, operating westbound towards Kidderminster via Stourbridge Junction and eastbound towards Birmingham Snow Hill. Eastbound services run to either Dorridge or Whitlocks End, with one of each extending to Stratford-upon-Avon. Many trains continue beyond Kidderminster to Worcester Foregate Street and/or Shrub Hill. Extra services are laid on around the time of football matches to assist fans in travelling to and from the match.

Chiltern Railways also serve the station with one train to Stourbridge Junction on weekdays only, from London Marylebone. There is no return service from The Hawthorns.

=== Tram ===
On Mondays to Fridays, West Midlands Metro services in each direction between Edgbaston Village and Wolverhampton St George's/Wolverhampton Station run at six to eight-minute intervals during the day, and at fifteen-minute intervals during the evenings and on Sundays. They run at eight minute intervals on Saturdays.

From 5 April 2026, some southbound services run to a temporary terminus at Millennium Point, on the yet-to-be completed new line to Digbeth.

Preceding station	West Midlands Metro	Following station
Kenrick Park	Line 1	Handsworth Booth Street
	National Rail	
Smethwick Galton Bridge	West Midlands Railway; Birmingham-Worcester via Kidderminster	Jewellery Quarter
Smethwick Galton Bridge	Chiltern Railways; London-Birmingham-Stourbridge	Jewellery Quarter
	Disused railways	
West Bromwich	Great Western Railway; Birmingham-Wolverhampton (1931–1968)	Handsworth and Smethwick
