= West Bromwich railway station =

Former railway station in England

West Bromwich

General information
- Location: West Bromwich, Sandwell; England
- Coordinates: 52.5170°N 1.9952°W
- Grid reference: SP004910
- Platforms: 2

Other information
- Status: Disused

History
- Original company: Great Western Railway
- Pre-grouping: Great Western Railway
- Post-grouping: Great Western Railway

Key dates
- 1854: Opened
- 1972: Closed
- 1999: Re-opened as West Bromwich Central Tram Stop
Location

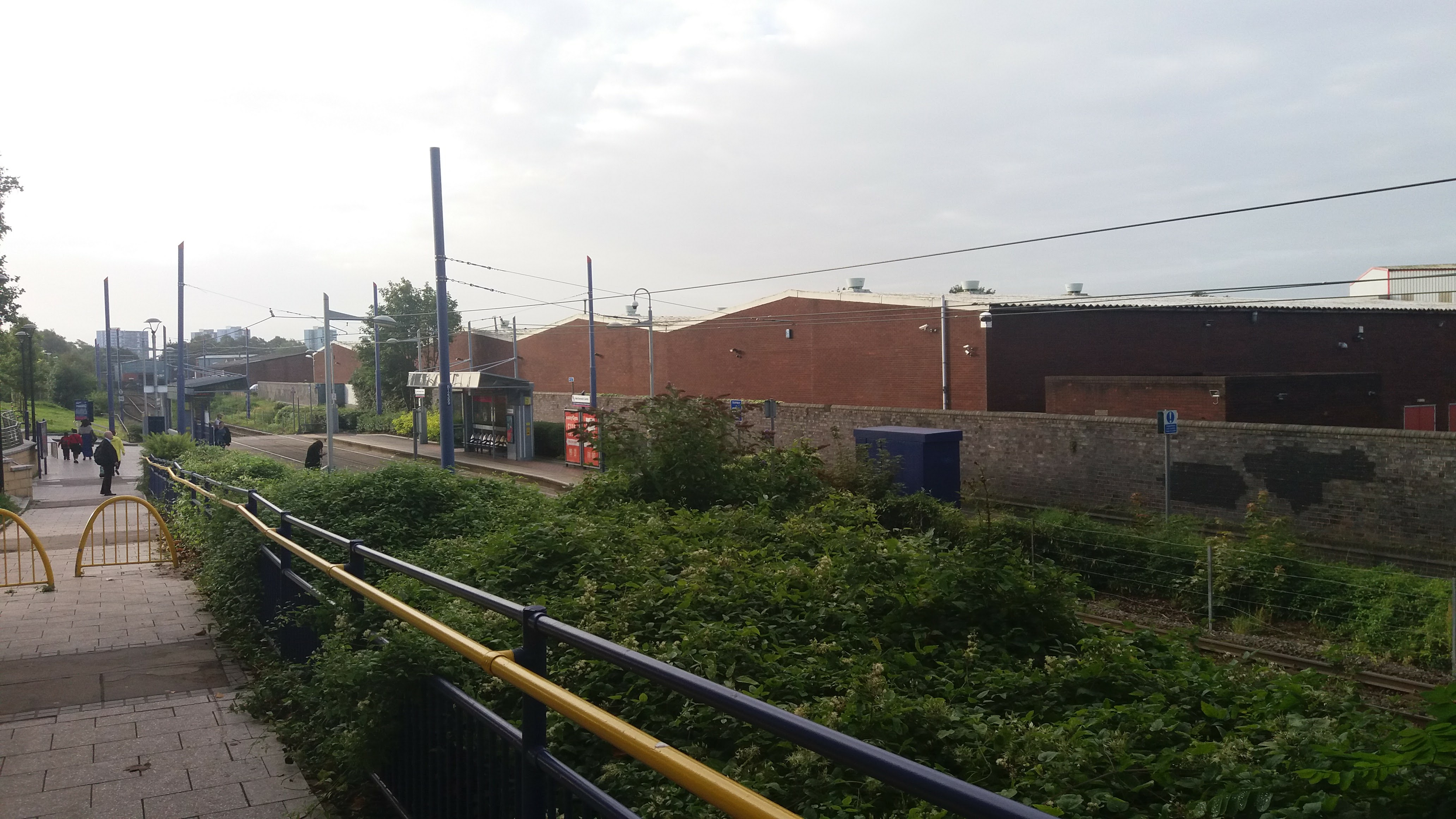
West Bromwich station site, now occupied by West Bromwich Central tram stop and the Midland Metro

West Bromwich railway station was a station on the Great Western Railway's London Paddington to Birkenhead via Birmingham Snow Hill line. It opened in 1854 and served the town of West Bromwich in the English West Midlands. It was closed along with the line in 1972.

== Site Today ==
West Bromwich town centre's rail link with Birmingham and Wolverhampton was restored in 1999 with the opening of the Midland Metro station known as West Bromwich Central. It wasn't until building work for this project began in the late 1990s that the remaining heavy rail architecture was removed.

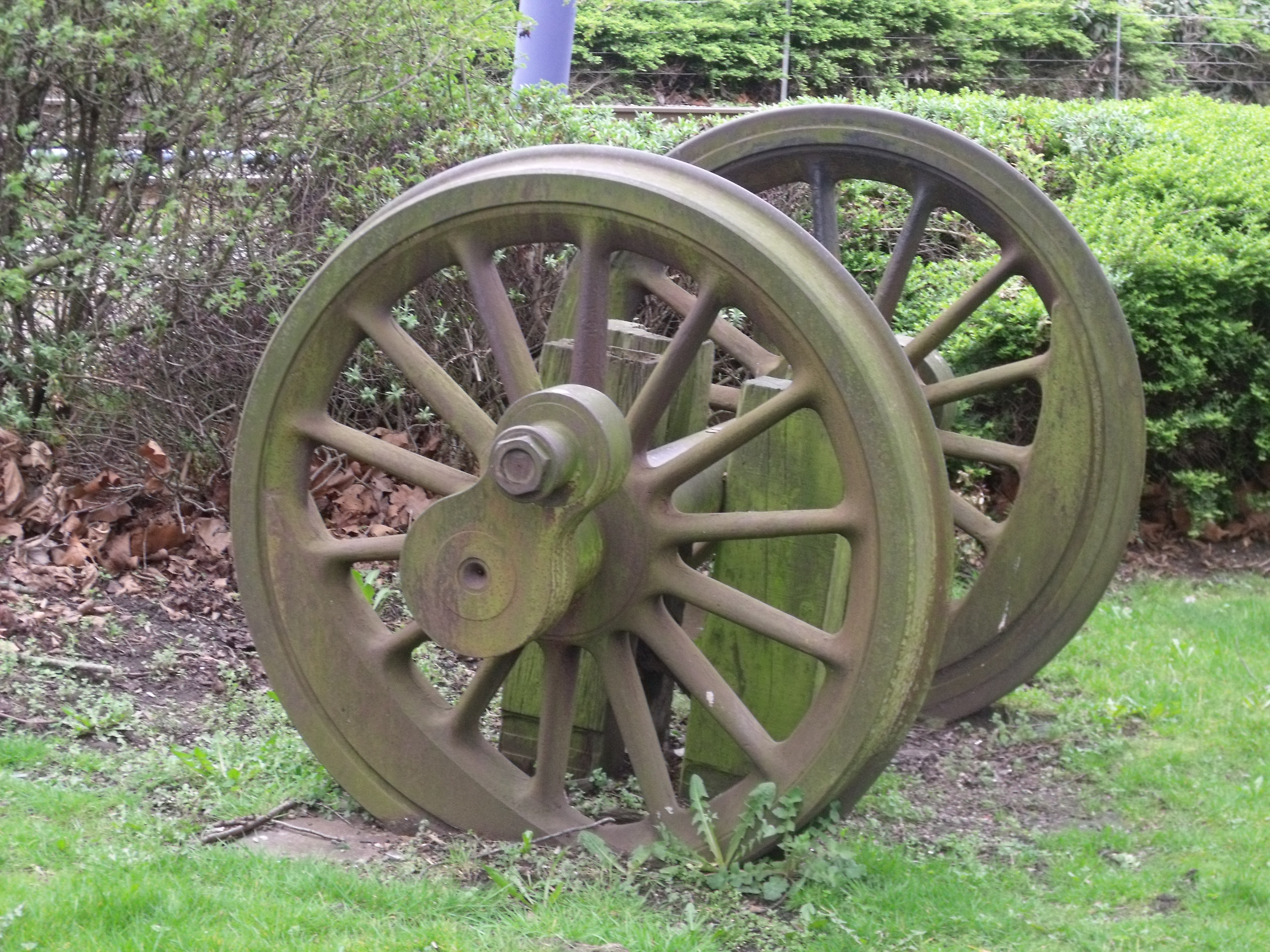
Locomotive wheels outside West Bromwich Central

The area's railway heritage is commemorated by a pair of railway locomotive wheels, preserved next to a footpath outside the metro station.

Preceding station	Disused railways	Following station
Swan Village	Great Western Railway; Birmingham-Wolverhampton (1854–1972)	The Hawthorns
