= Birmingham Snow Hill to Wolverhampton Low Level Line =

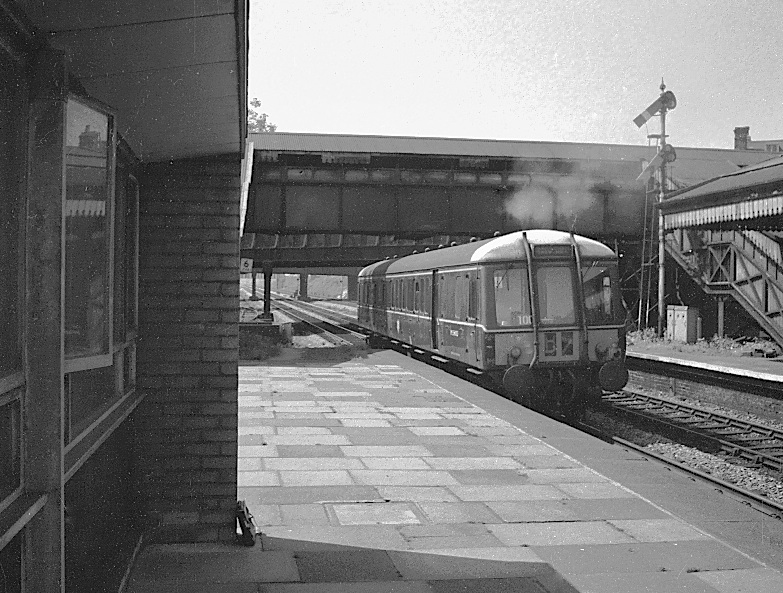
- Soho and Winson Green station in 1967

Overview
- Status: Partially reopened for heavy rail and light rail
- Owner: Birmingham, Wolverhampton and Dudley Railway; British Rail
- Locale: West Midlands, England
- Termini: Birmingham Snow Hill; Wolverhampton Low Level
- Stations: 16

Service
- Type: Local rail
- System: National Rail
- Operator: West Midlands Trains/West Midlands Metro

History
- Opened: 1854
- Closed: 1992

Technical
- Track gauge: Dual 7 ft 1/4 in (2,140 mm)/4 ft 8 1/2 in (1,435 mm) standard gauge

The Birmingham Snow Hill to Wolverhampton Low Level Line was part of the Great Western Railway's London Paddington to Birkenhead Woodside route. As the name suggests, it ran between Birmingham Snow Hill and Wolverhampton Low Level in England. The line was dual-gauged, both 7 ft 1/4 in (2,140 mm) and 4 ft 8 1/2 in (1,435 mm) standard gauge.

The line opened in 1854 and the final section was closed in August 1992, following the closure of other sections during the 1970s and 1980s. The opening was delayed for two months because a bridge collapsed near Winson Green, which caused chief engineer Isambard Kingdom Brunel to order strengthening on several other bridges. Passenger services had been discontinued in 1972, although parts of the line continued to be used by goods trains.

== History ==
The Birmingham, Wolverhampton and Dudley Railway was authorised on 3 August 1846. It quickly joined forces with the Birmingham and Oxford Junction Railway and both companies were bought by the Great Western on 14 November 1846. Construction began at Birmingham Snow Hill in 1851 and the line opened on 14 November 1854. Stations were: Birmingham Snow Hill - Hockley - Soho & Winson Green - Hawthorns Halt - West Bromwich - Swan Village - Wednesbury Central - Bradley & Moxley - Bilston Central - Priestfield - Wolverhampton Low Level.

== Dudley Branch ==
This particular stretch of line had many intermediate stations and included a branch to Dudley railway station. Travelling towards Wolverhampton, the branch diverged north of Swan Village railway station, and joined the South Staffordshire Line east of Dudley Port railway station. Trains called at Great Bridge South railway station, Dudley Port railway station and Dudley railway station on the branch. This line closed in 1968.

== Closure ==
Despite being featured in the second Beeching Report, The Development of the Major Railway Trunk Routes in February 1965 as being a line that should be further invested in, all stations on the line between Birmingham and Wolverhampton closed to passengers in 1972. The line was closed between Snow Hill and Wednesbury at this point.

Wolverhampton Low Level remained open until 1981 as a parcels depot. The northern section of the railway beyond the scrapyard at Bilston closed in December 1982, and the final section from Wednesbury to Bilston stayed open until August 1992, but by this time plans were afoot for the bulk of the line to be reopened within a few years as the first line of the Midland Metro tram network.

== Reopening ==
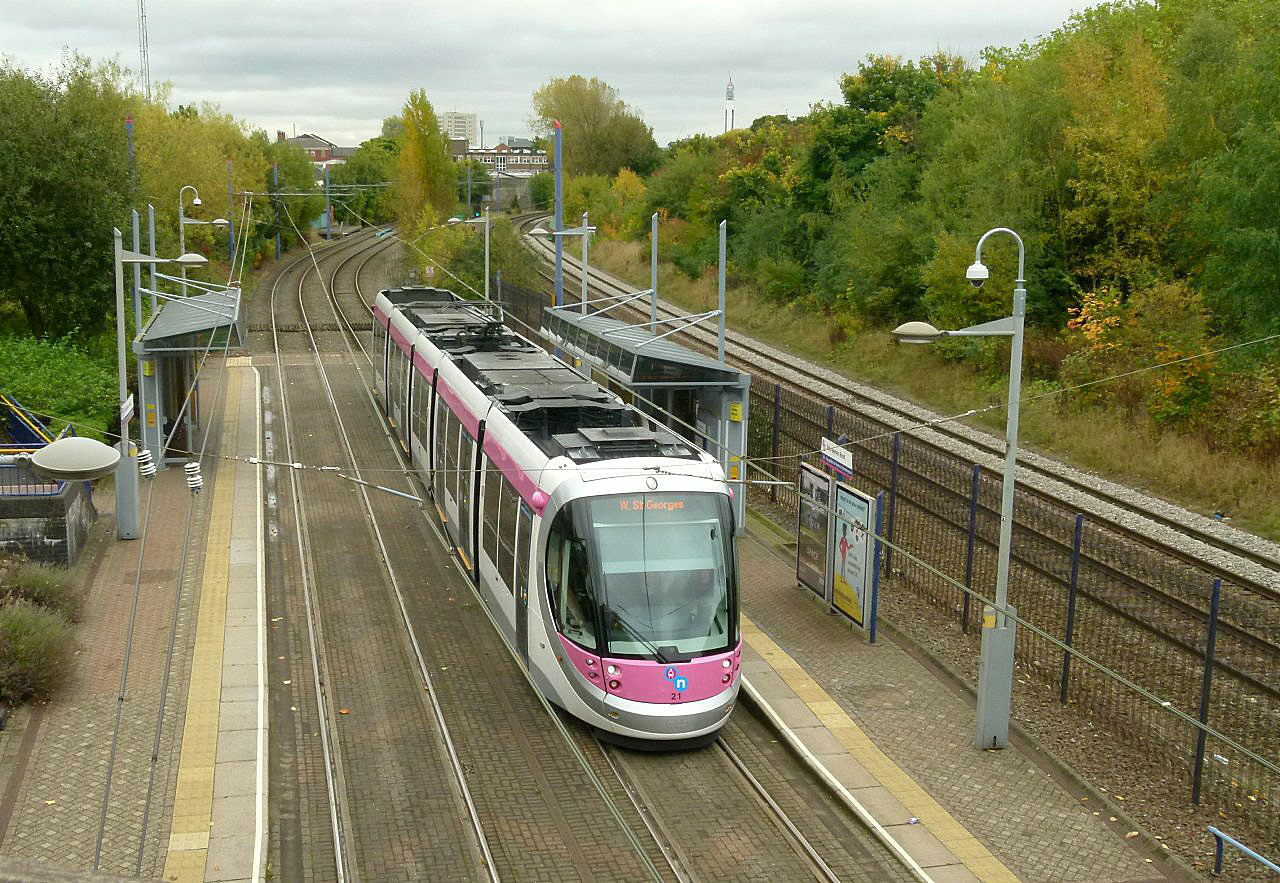
A West Midlands Metro tram at Soho Benson Road in 2015; here, the light rail tracks run parallel to the main line

In 1995, the 'Jewellery Line' saw the relaying of tracks as far as a short distance past The Hawthorns before the line branched off, crossing the Rugby–Birmingham–Stafford line at the also-new Smethwick Galton Bridge and joining the main Birmingham to Worcester via Kidderminster line, which previously routed into Birmingham New Street

The rest of the original GWR line was reopened in May 1999 as the first phase of the West Midlands Metro tram network, although the lines leave the original trackbed between Priestfield and Wolverhampton Low Level due to Low Level being closed and eventually partly demolished for use for housing and commercial use. The other areas around Wolverhampton, Bilston, Wednesbury, West Bromwich, Smethwick and the western side of Birmingham that were served before the closure of Snow Hill are now served by the Metro. The Metro runs parallel to the Jewellery Line from Snow Hill to a point north of The Hawthorns and makes it the only time the metro is on the same line as heavy rail and it remains side by side with heavy rail from the south of the Hawthorns to Birmingham Snow Hill before it continues on street level into the city centre.
