= Wolverhampton Low Level railway station =

Disused railway station in the West Midlands, England

Wolverhampton Low Level
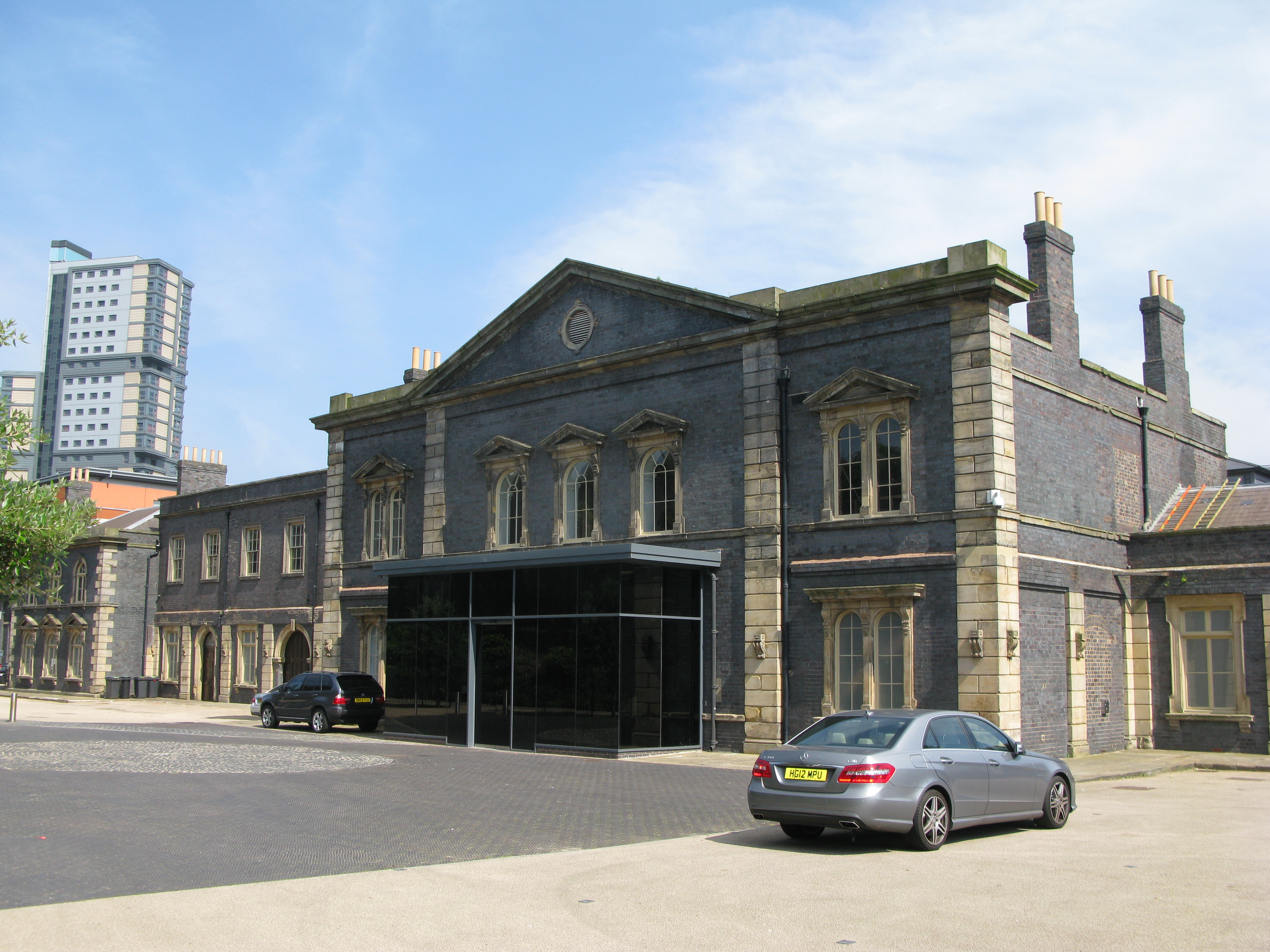
- The station's main building (2014)

General information
- Location: Wolverhampton, England
- Coordinates: 52.5882°N 2.1187°W
- Grid reference: SO920989
- Platforms: 5

Other information
- Status: Disused

History
- Pre-grouping: Great Western Railway

Key dates
- 1 July 1854: Opened as Wolverhampton Joint
- 1856: Renamed Wolverhampton Low Level
- 1869: Converted to standard gauge
- 1922: Station mostly rebuilt
- 6 March 1972: Closed to passenger traffic
- 1981: Closed to goods traffic
- 2006: Large parts of the station demolished
Location

Wolverhampton Low Level served the city of Wolverhampton, in the West Midlands, England, between 1869 and 1981. It was one of two railway stations in the city centre; the other is the High Level station, which remains in service. It was built by the Great Western Railway (GWR), on their route from London Paddington to Birkenhead Woodside, via Birmingham Snow Hill. It was the most northerly broad-gauge station on the GWR network.

== History ==
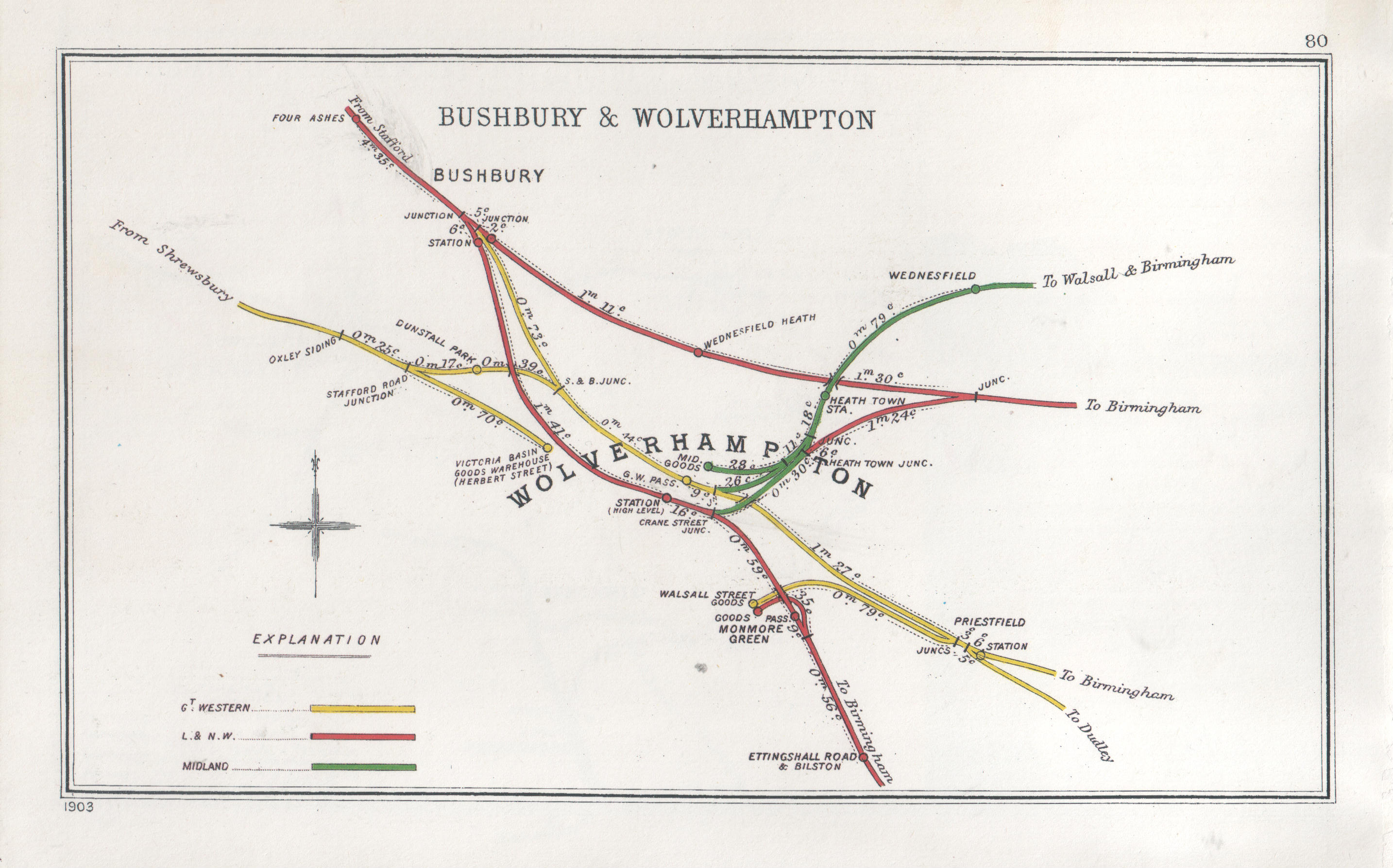
Diagram of railways around central Wolverhampton from 1914. The Low Level station is the yellow station in the centre labelled G.W. Pass

The station was opened in 1854, although construction was not completed until late 1855. The station was built jointly by the Oxford, Worcester and Wolverhampton Railway (OWWR) and the GWR. The station was initially called Wolverhampton Joint and was renamed to Wolverhampton Low Level in April 1856, which is when the nearby London and North Western Railway station was renamed from Wolverhampton Queen Street to Wolverhampton High Level.

The station was converted to standard gauge in 1869 (although remnants of Broad Gauge remained in the bay platform) and remained largely the same until 1922, when new booking office was built within the booking hall and a new telegraph department was added to the stationmaster's office. The platforms were extended and the passenger footbridge was replaced. The overall roof had corroded badly and was replaced with standard GWR platform canopies.

In July 1939, an Irish Republican Army bomb exploded at the station, wrecking the parcels office area.

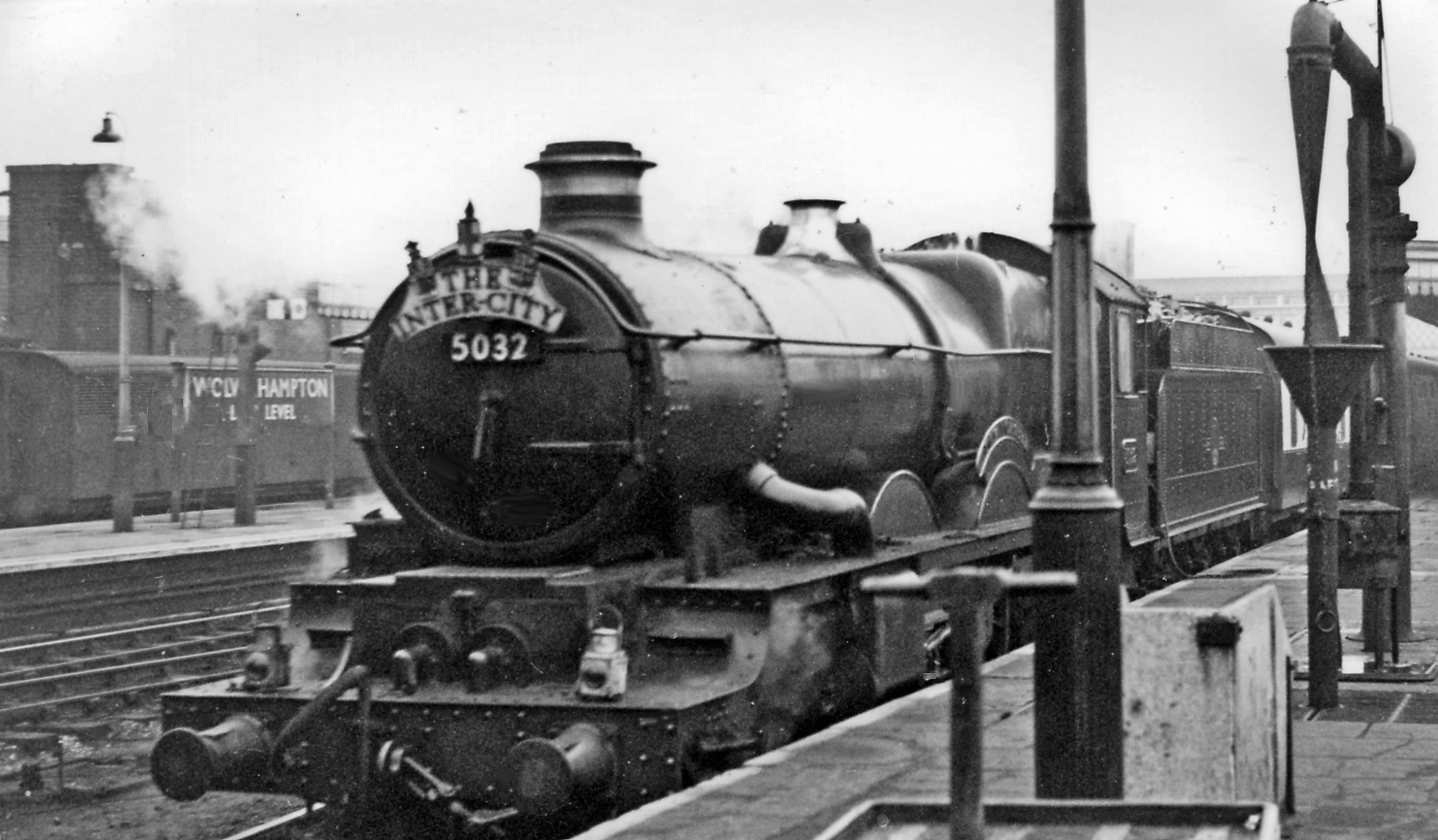
The Inter-City arrives (1958)

=== Closure ===
Closure of the station was made likely by the West Coast Main Line electrification scheme started in 1959, which included the Stour Valley Line, a rebuilt High Level station, and new connections between the former LMS and GWR systems north of the town. From late 1963 to March 1967, the Low Level stationsaw a considerable increase in traffic, but this was only while the electrification work was in progress, as many services were temporarily diverted away from the High Level.

When the Stour Valley Line reopened, the services through Low Level were quickly reduced. The last London to Birkenhead Woodside express ran in March 1967 and in 1968 Shrewsbury services switched to the High Level. By 1970, the only services left running from Low Level were local trains to Birmingham Snow Hill, via Wednesbury Central. This service ceased when the line closed to passengers in 1972.

In 1970, the station was converted to a Parcels Concentration Department. Much of the trackwork was removed, the north signal box was demolished and the platforms were greatly modified. It opened on 6 April 1970 and was very successful, handling up to 8,000 parcels each day.

However, British Rail's policy on parcel handling soon changed and the station was closed on 12 June 1981.

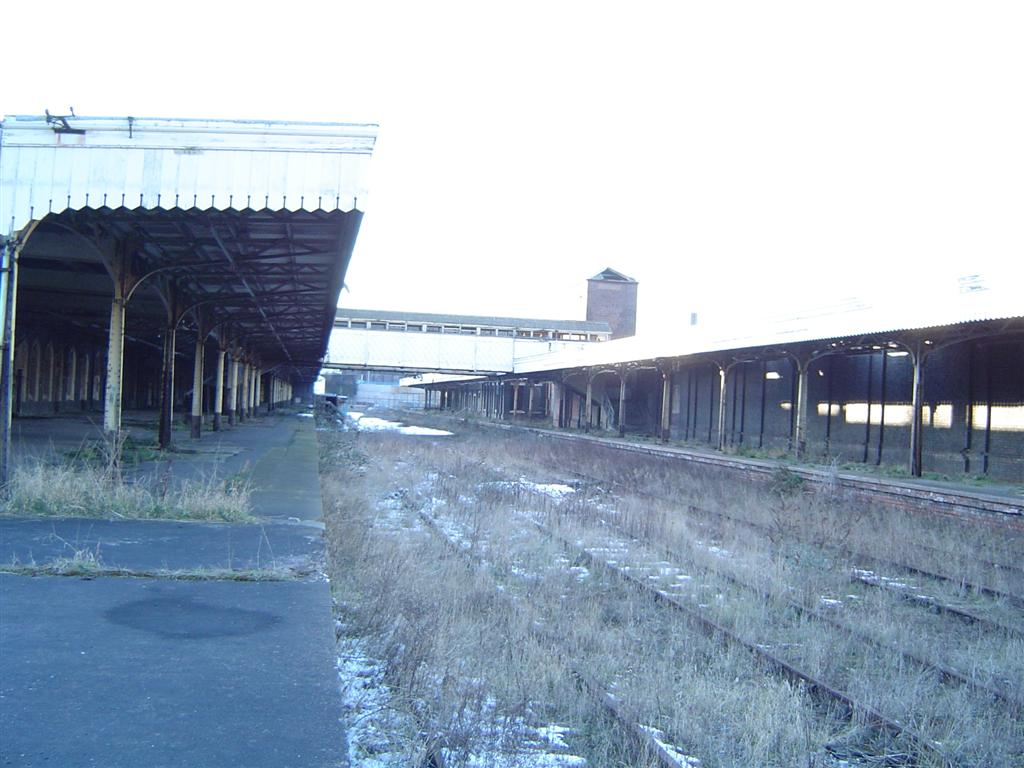
Platforms and trackbed, prior to redevelopment (January 2006)

The building was listed as Grade II on 25 March 1986. It remained as the British Rail Divisional Engineer's Department until it was purchased by Wolverhampton Metropolitan Borough Council in May 1986, which immediately renovated and preserved the exterior. Meanwhile, the route of the trackbed between Bushbury and Birmingham Snow Hill was preserved, in case of future reopening of the line.

Preceding station	Disused railways	Following station
Dunstall Park	Great Western Railway "The Wombourne Branch" (1925-1932)	Terminus
Dunstall Park	Great Western Railway; Wolverhampton-Shrewsbury (1854-1968)	Terminus
Terminus	Great Western Railway; Birmingham-Wolverhampton (1854-1972)	Priestfield
Terminus	Great Western Railway; Oxford, Worcester and Wolverhampton Railway	Priestfield

== Design ==
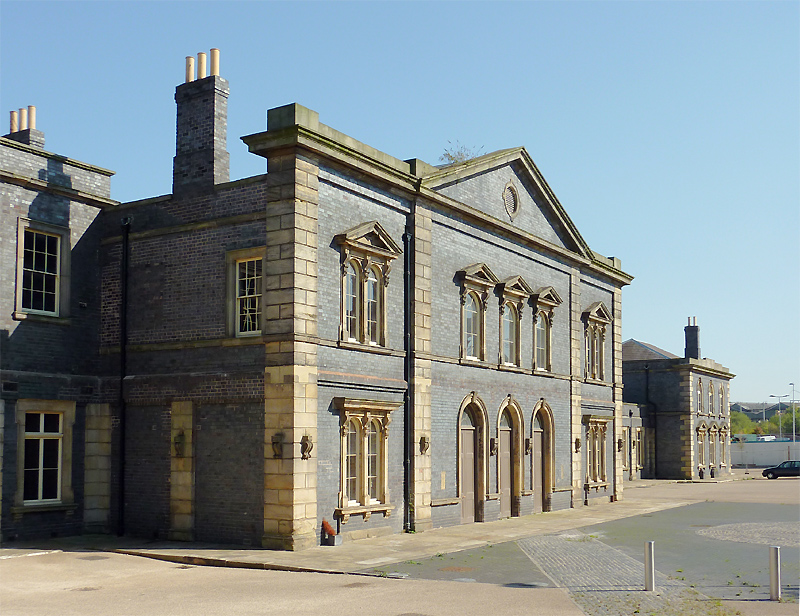
Station frontage

The OWWR's engineer, John Fowler, designed the frontage, while the GWR's Isambard Kingdom Brunel designed the layout.

The station building is two storeys high and constructed of Staffordshire blue brick in Italianate style, which is an unusual combination but the blue brick was abundant in the area in the 19th century. The design of the station was similar to that of the earlier High Level station. The main building has a large pediment; tall, round-headed, pedimented windows with ashlar brackets on the first floor which the main entrance on the ground floor. Plainer wings extend to either side of the main building which protrude to the front. The interior of the former booking hall continues the Italianate theme, with a high, coved ceiling and full-height cornices. The interior was carefully restored in the early 2000s.

== Redevelopment ==
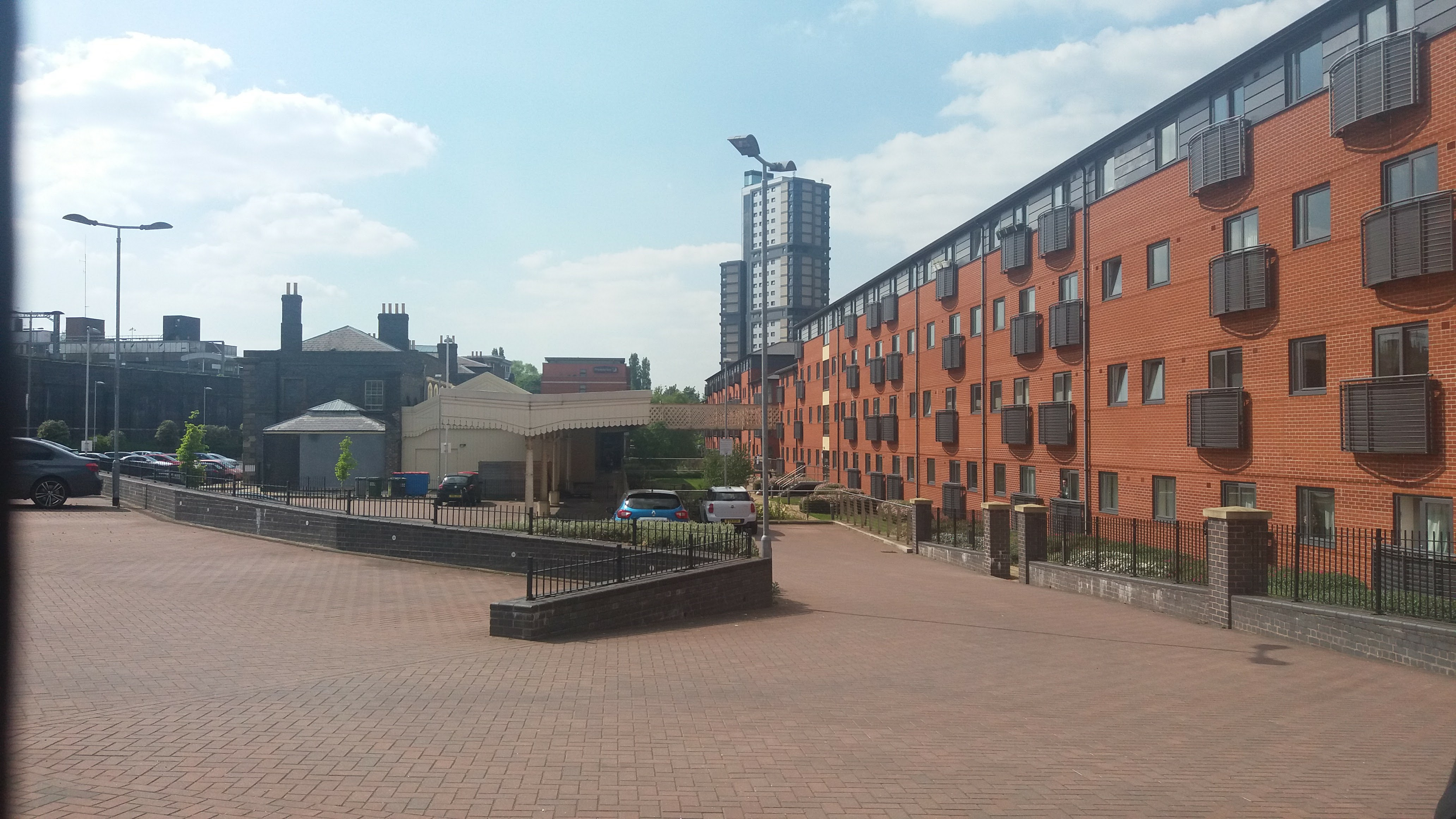
The old platform

During the 1980s and 1990s, there were several proposals for redevelopment of the site, including reopening the station and converting it into a transport museum, but none came to fruition.

In 1999, the Midland Metro tramway opened, using most of the GWR route between Wolverhampton and Birmingham, but this turns towards the centre of Wolverhampton to run along the A41 Bilston Road before reaching Low Level.

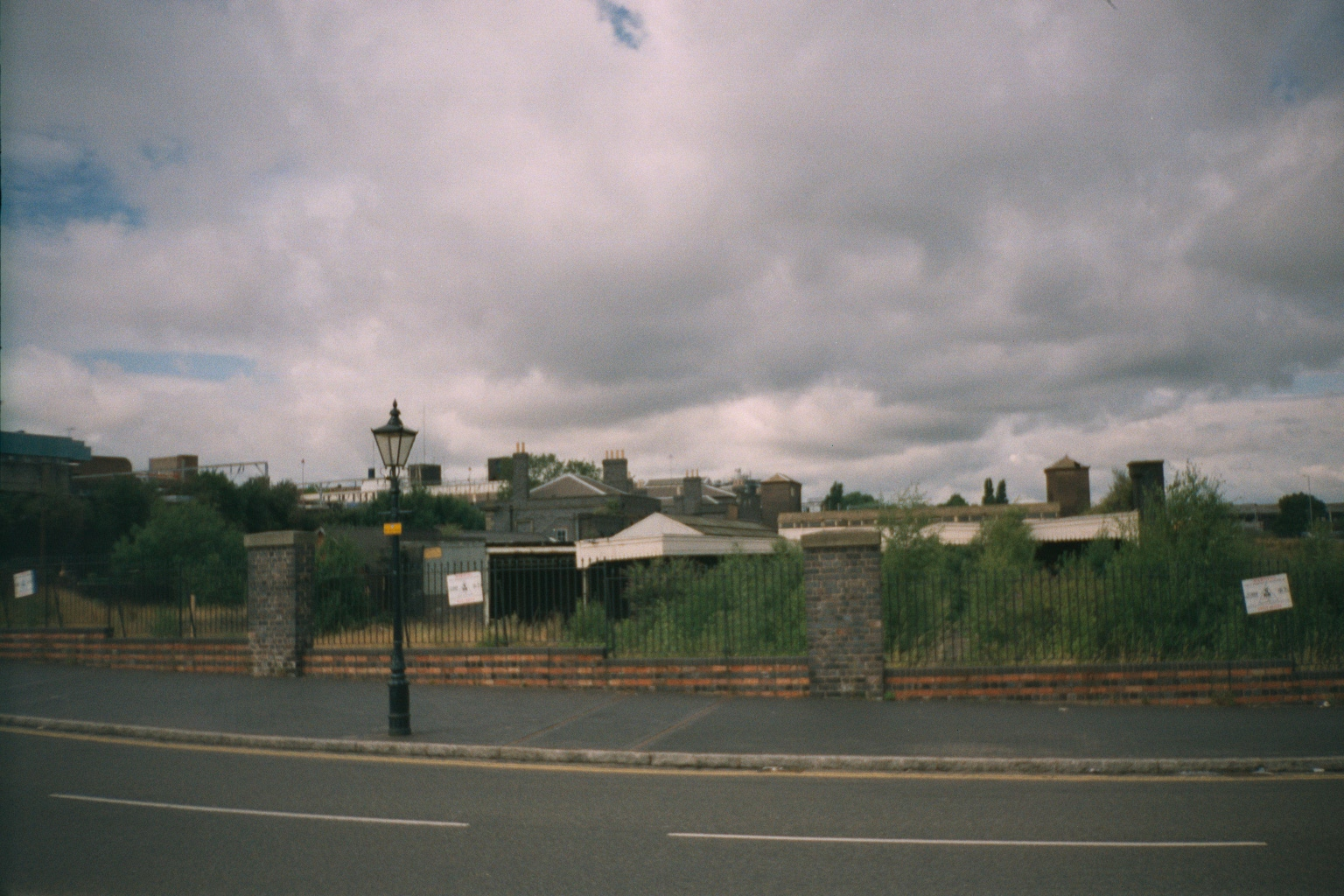
A general view of the southern end of Low Level station (2000)

Redevelopment of the Low Level station site began in 2006, retaining the main station building which is a listed building; the remainder of the station, including the former main southbound platform, was demolished to make way for a mixed-use retail, hotel and residential development. This redevelopment of the station was completed in 2019, following the opening of Aldi supermarket. The station building itself was destined to become a casino, but plans fell through.

The restored station was home to an art gallery until July 2010. The station building has been transformed into the Grand Station banqueting hall and wedding venue.

== Station surrounds ==
Several other structures associated with the station are listed buildings. A tall, blue-brick retaining wall and subway lead beneath the High Level tracks to the station, originally built as a shortcut between the two stations and known as "the Colonnades".

The brickwork on the interior is glazed white and has decorative iron railings mounted to it. The wall and subway form a grade II listed building. Due to the construction of the replacement High Level station, the Colonnades and subway were closed temporarily and, as of December 2021, they remain closed.
