= Wednesbury Central railway station =

Former railway station in England

Wednesbury Central

General information
- Location: Wednesbury, Sandwell; England
- Coordinates: 52.5494°N 2.0267°W
- Grid reference: SO982946
- Platforms: 2

Other information
- Status: Disused

History
- Original company: Great Western Railway
- Pre-grouping: Great Western Railway
- Post-grouping: Great Western Railway

Key dates
- 1854: Opened as Wednesbury
- 1950: Renamed as Wednesbury Central
- 1972: Closed
- 1999: Re-opened as Wednesbury Great Western Street tram stop
Location

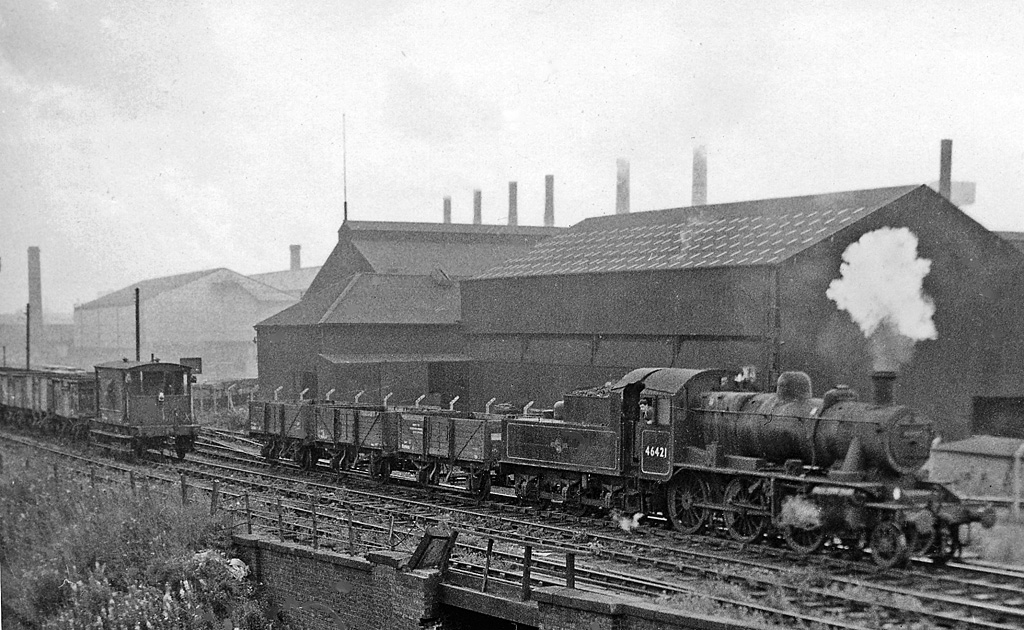
Shunting operations at Wednesbury in 1962

Wednesbury Central railway station was a station on the Great Western Railway's London Paddington to Birkenhead via Birmingham Snow Hill line. It was opened as Wednesbury in 1854 and was one of two stations serving Wednesbury in the West Midlands. It was renamed to Wednesbury Central in 1950 following nationalisation. It closed along with the Birmingham to Wolverhampton section of the line in 1972.

== Site Today ==
The site is now used by the Midland Metro as Wednesbury Great Western Street tram stop.

Preceding station	Disused railways	Following station
Bradley and Moxley; Line and station closed	Great Western Railway; Birmingham-Wolverhampton (1854–1972)	Swan Village; Line and station closed
