= Transport in Birmingham =

Overview of the transport infrastructure in Birmingham

Birmingham is a major transport hub, due in part to its location in central England. The city is well connected by rail, road, and water. Public transport and key highways in the city are overseen by Transport for West Midlands (TfWM).

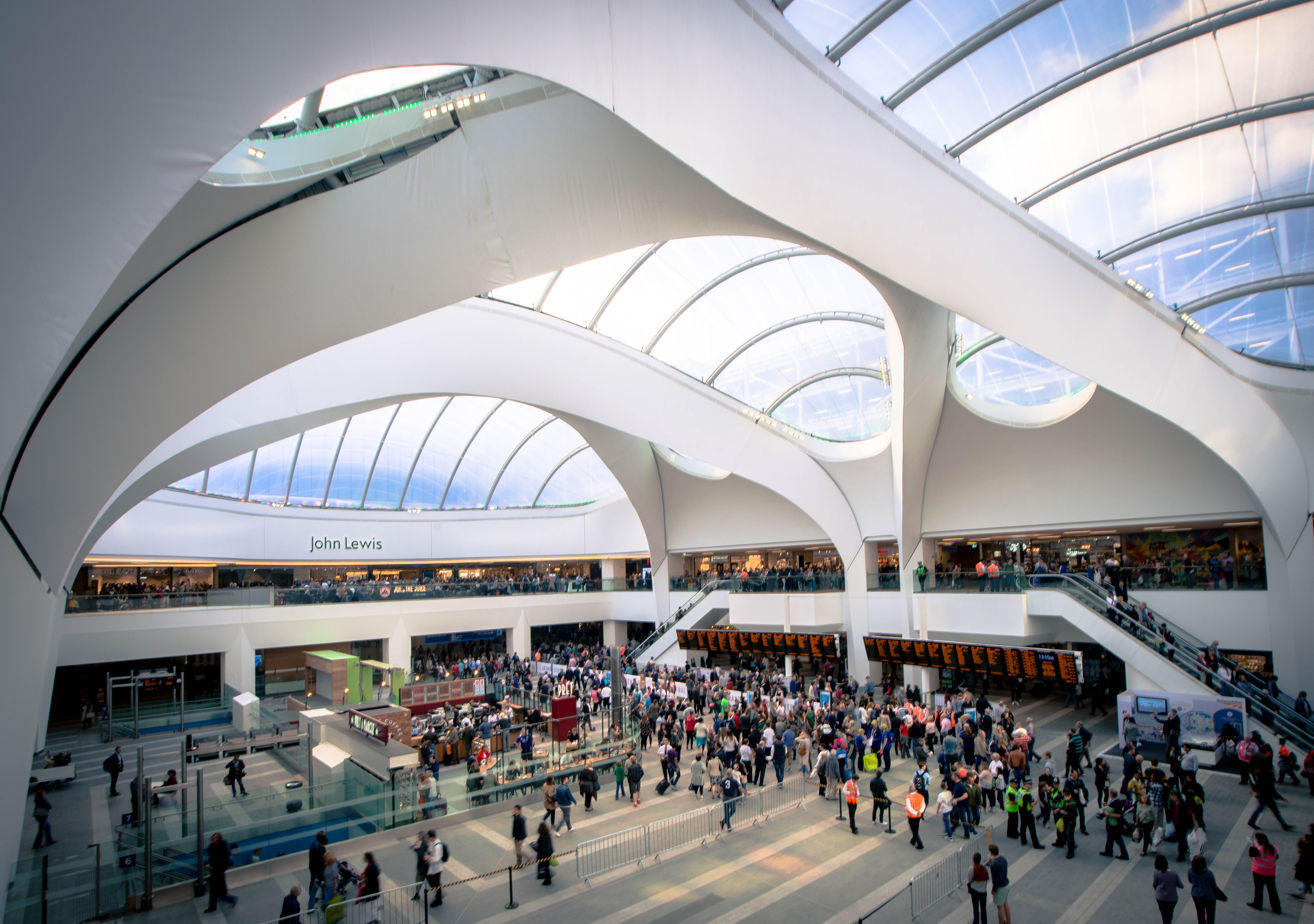
Birmingham New Street Station

== Railways ==
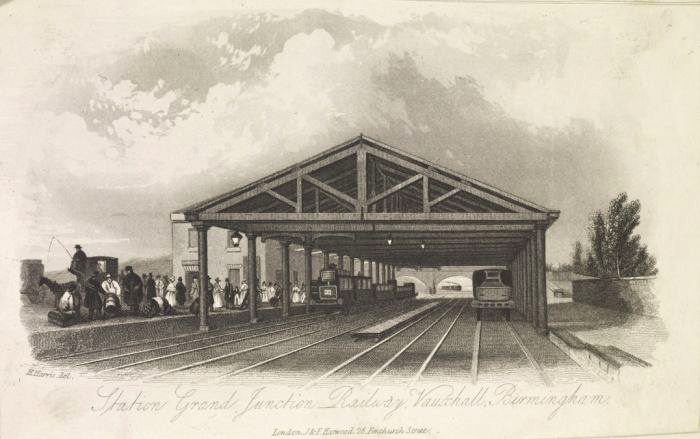
Vauxhall railway station – Birmingham's first – in 1837

=== History ===
The first railway station to open in Birmingham was Vauxhall station, which opened in 1837 as a temporary railway shed. It served as the temporary Birmingham terminus of the Grand Junction Railway from Warrington. Curzon Street railway station opened in 1838 as the permanent terminus in the city and Vauxhall became a goods-only station until it was rebuilt and opened in 1869 under the London & North Western Railway (LNWR). The Curzon Street station entrance hall remains today in its original form, designed by Philip Hardwick, mirroring his design of the Euston Arch at the London terminus of the railway line. It is Grade I listed and is the world's oldest surviving piece of monumental railway architecture. It closed to all railway traffic in 1966.

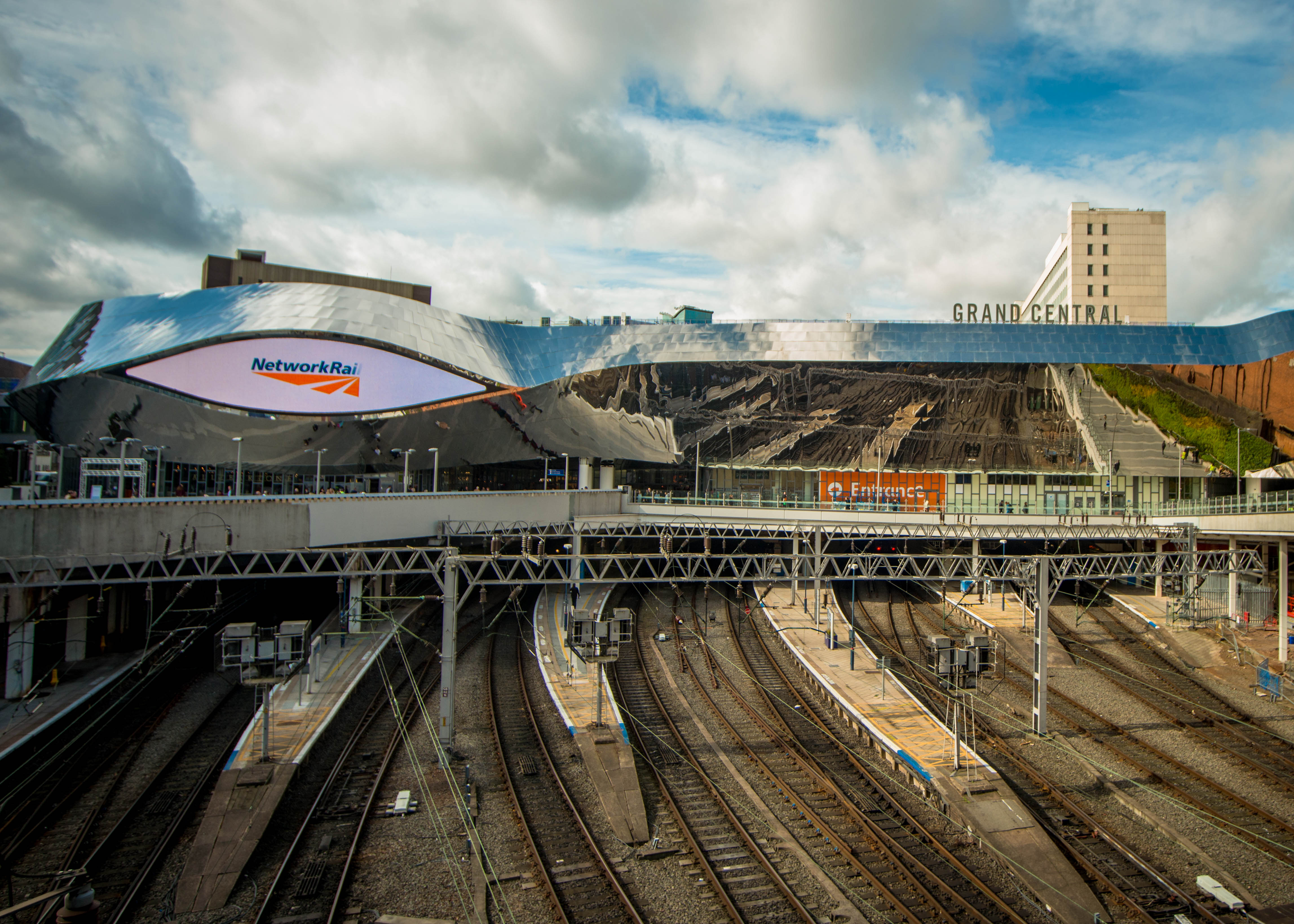
Birmingham New Street station

New Street station opened in 1854, and Curzon Street station fell out of passenger use, running only holiday excursions for the public. New Street helped by becoming a hub for railway lines, easing connections between them. Despite this, an extension of New Street station was required in the 1880s so that Midland Railway trains between Derby and Bristol no longer needed to use Camp Hill railway station which opened in 1840.

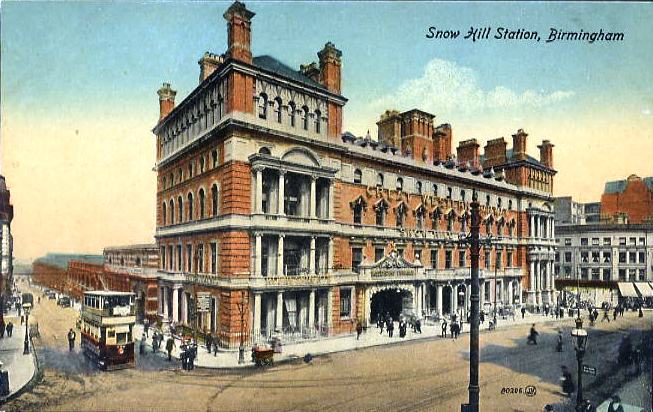
The original Snow Hill station

Snow Hill station was the next major station to open in Birmingham, opening in 1852 as Livery Street station. It connected London Paddington to Wolverhampton Low Level. The station was rebuilt in 1871 to accommodate longer trains and again between 1906 and 1912. The latter scheme was undertaken so that the station could compete better with New Street. Other stations on the line in Birmingham were Soho & Winson Green and Hockley. To alleviate pressure on Snow Hill, Moor Street station was opened in 1909 as a terminus for the North Warwickshire lines. The two stations were linked by tunnel which closed in 1968, only to be reopened in 1987 under British Rail, when the new Moor Street station was completed. The 1960s Beeching cuts stated Snow Hill station as being unnecessary and the station closed in 1972 along with the line to Wolverhampton Low Level. The station was demolished by 1977, with only the original gates and booking hall sign surviving. However, in the 1980s, British Rail decided to re-open Snow Hill station as part of the cross-city transport plan for Birmingham. It reopened in 1987 as part of a completely redeveloped site with new office buildings replacing the original hotel, and multi-storey car parking over the station concourses. In 2011 a new station entrance was opened linking Snow Hill station to the Jewellery Quarter, on the other side of the A41 Queensway inner distribution road.

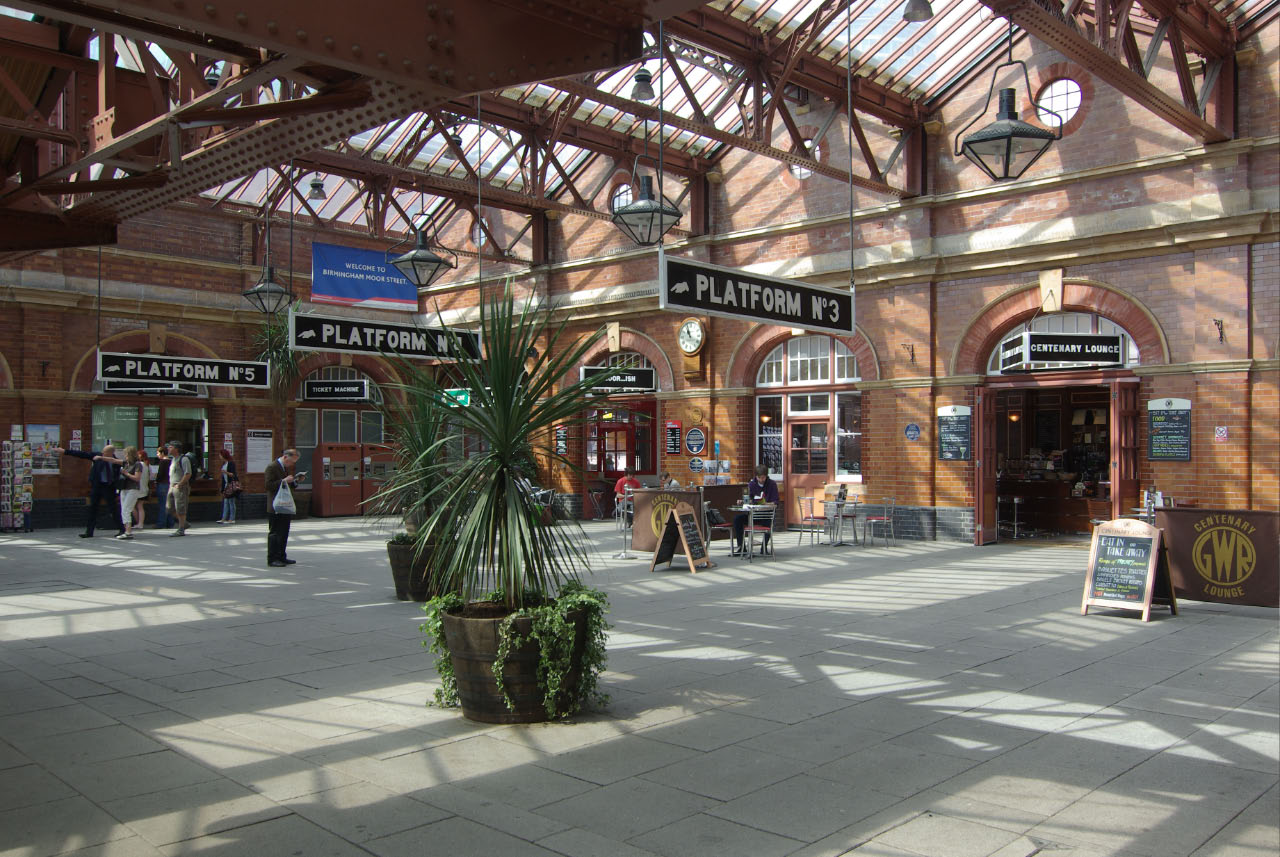
Moor Street station as of 2010 and after renovation

In 1986, Moor Street was relocated adjacent to the original station. However, in 2002, the original Moor Street station was renovated by the Birmingham Alliance and Chiltern Railways at a cost of £11 million, and converted into a shopping and refreshment area connected to the new platforms.

The Harborne Branch Line opened in 1875, connecting New Street to the outlying suburb of Harborne. A connection to the LNWR was created at Monument Lane. The branch terminated at Harborne railway station. The line began to suffer from falling passenger numbers, largely due to the increasing popularity of buses but also due to train delays as a result of congestion of routes at New Street station. Icknield Port Road station closed in 1931, and the other stations closed to passengers on 26 November 1934. The last passenger train to run on the line was an enthusiasts' special on 3 June 1950. The line closed to freight traffic on 4 November 1963.

In 1978 the Cross-City Line came into being, comprising the former Midland Railway line between Redditch and New Street via Selly Oak and the London and North Western Railway Line between New Street and Lichfield. It connects Sutton Coldfield, which was absorbed into Birmingham in 1974, with the Birmingham city centre. This line provides the only passenger service to Sutton Coldfield; the Sutton Park Line, opened in 1879 and closed to passengers in 1965, is still in use as a freight-only line avoiding central Birmingham.

=== Mainline services ===
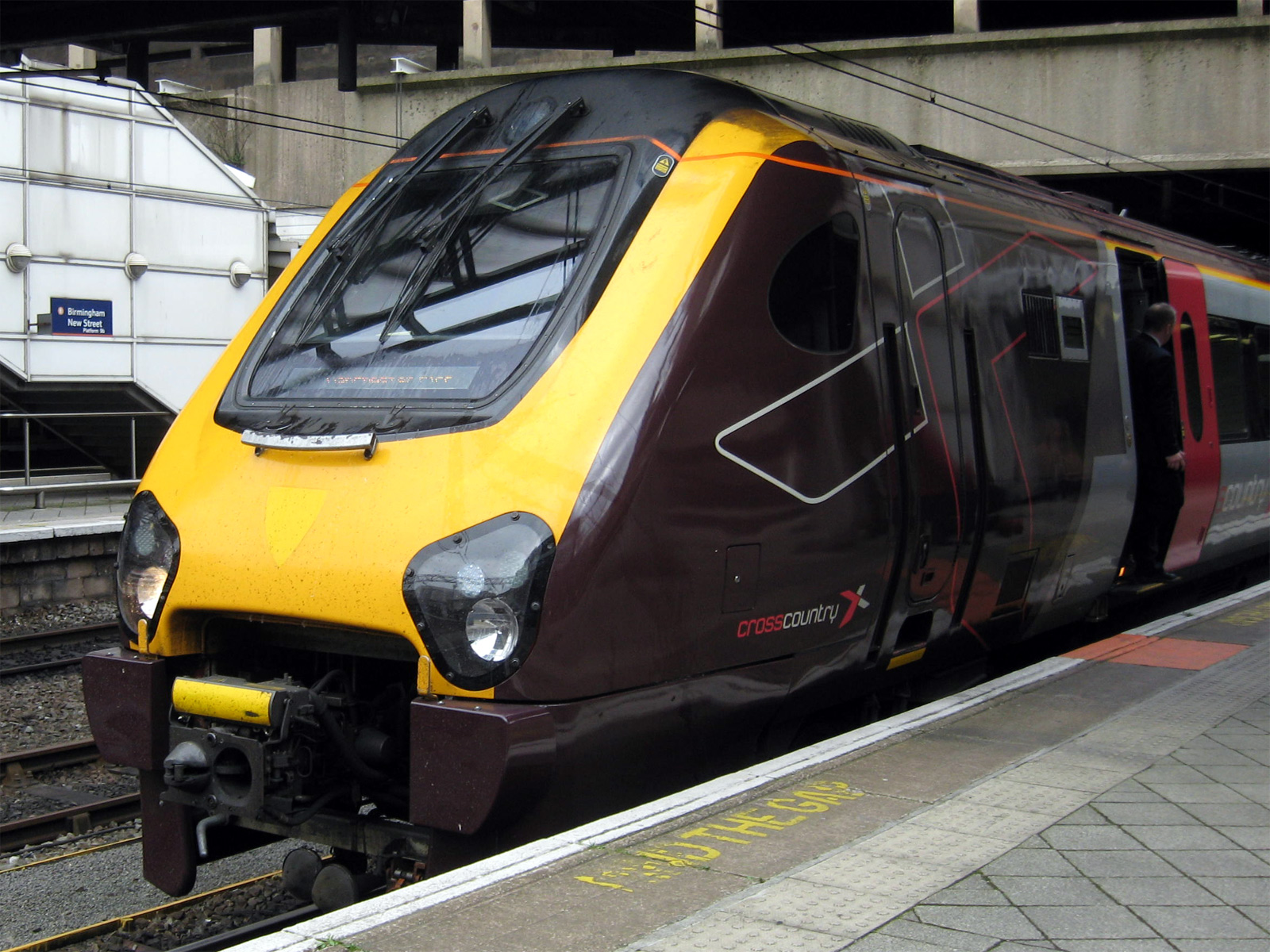
A CrossCountry Class 220 Voyager at Birmingham New Street hub

A large number of railway lines meet at Birmingham New Street railway station, which is a hub of the UK rail network and is the calling point for most intercity services to and from Birmingham. Trains to London Marylebone operated by Chiltern Railways stop at Moor Street station, and most continue to Snow Hill station.

New Street Station has been redeveloped in a £500 million scheme named Gateway Plus. The project improved passenger facilities and increased passenger capacity at the station, which had been running at over double its capacity. The first stage of the development was completed in April 2013, when the old concourse was closed. The project was completed in 2015.

Phase One of High Speed 2 is to have its first spur to Birmingham linking with London. Phase Two will create new high speed links from Birmingham to Leeds and Manchester. Since New Street does not have sufficient capacity for the new high-speed trains, a new dedicated high-speed railway station will be built at Curzon Street, partly on the site of the former station, and adjacent to Moor Street. A new station called Birmingham Interchange will be opened adjacent to Birmingham International to serve the city's airport and the National Exhibition Centre.

=== Local services ===
Map of the passenger rail and tram network in the Birmingham & West Midlands area

There is a network of rail services within Birmingham and the West Midlands county, operated by West Midlands Trains and supported by Transport for West Midlands (TfWM) (formerly called Centro). During 2014/15, there were nearly 51 million rail passenger journeys in the TfWM area. Birmingham has the highest proportion of rail commuters in England outside London. In the past few decades the proportion of journeys into central Birmingham by rail has grown sharply: 35% of journeys into Birmingham city centre in the peak hours were made by rail in 2025, compared to 27% in 2012 and 17% in 2001

Most of the Birmingham and West Midlands County local commuter lines are centred on New Street station, including the Cross-City Line, the Chase Line, the Coventry-Wolverhampton Line and the Camp Hill Line. Three commuter routes, known collectively as the Snow Hill Lines, run through Snow Hill and Moor Street stations.

Plans are being pursued to divert services on the newly-reopened Camp Hill line in southern Birmingham into Moor Street, as opposed to New Street, by constructing new chords into Birmingham Moor Street station. This would also allow for new local services on the lines from Birmingham to Tamworth and Nuneaton.

Stations at Moseley Village (formerly "Moseley"), Pineapple Road (formerly "Hazelwell") and Kings Heath, all closed in January 1941, reopened on 7 April 2026.

== Light Rail ==
=== West Midlands Metro ===
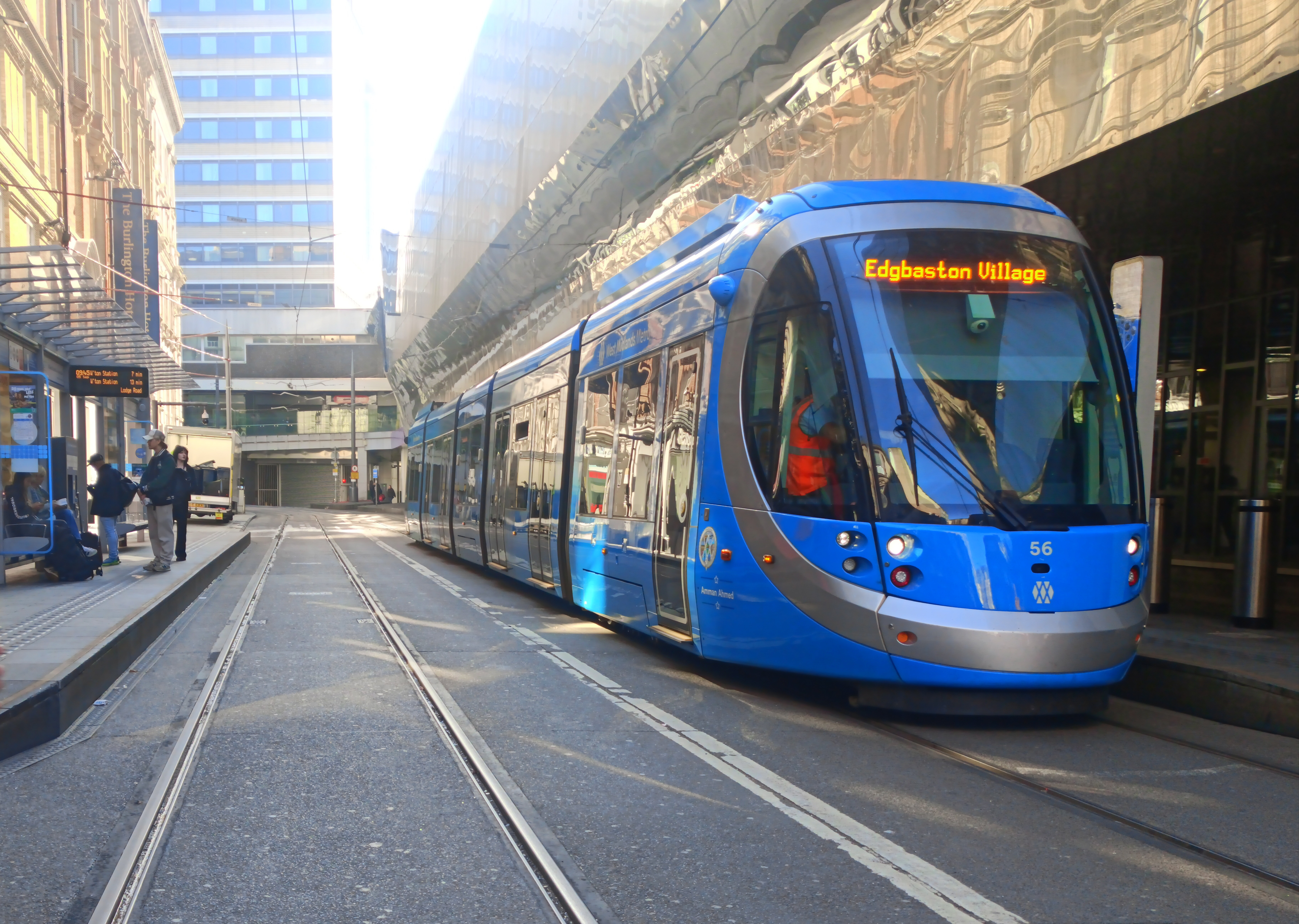
West Midlands Metro tram connects the city and surrounding areas.

The West Midlands Metro is a light-rail tram system promoted by TfWM. The system currently has one line, which connects Birmingham to Wolverhampton via West Bromwich and Wednesbury. The original line from Wolverhampton to Birmingham Snow Hill was opened in 1999. In 2016, the line was extended across Birmingham city centre from Birmingham Snow Hill to Birmingham New Street station, subsequently extended to Centenary Square, and then Five Ways and Edgbaston, and on another line connecting to the Eastside of the city centre. There are long-term plans to extend the system across Birmingham and the West Midlands. Three new lines to Brierley Hill, Digbeth and Birmingham Airport are under construction. With more lines receiving £1.7bn in funding to Walsall, Stourbridge, Quinton, Wednesfield, Solihull and New Cross Hospital that are currently in development / planning.

=== Birmingham Corporation Tramways ===
Birmingham Corporation Tramways operated a network of tramways in Birmingham from 1904 until 1953. It was the largest narrow-gauge tramway network in the UK, and was built to a gauge of 3 ft 6 in (1,067 mm). It was the fourth largest tramway network in the UK behind London, Glasgow and Manchester.

== Underground system ==
In the early 1950s, the government planned to protect essential communications by building a series of hardened underground telephone exchanges. Construction of the Anchor exchange in Birmingham started in 1953 with a cover story that a new underground rail network was being built. Work progressed until 1956 when the public were told the project was no longer economic; instead Birmingham got its underpasses through the city to help relieve congestion. An underground exchange and tunnel system 100 ft below Newhall Street had been completed at a cost £4 million. The main tunnel runs from Anchor to Midland ATE in Hill Street, from there the tunnel continued under New Street Station and on to the exchange in Essex Street.

More recently, the Conservative–Lib-Dem coalition running Birmingham City Council proposed an underground system as an alternative to expansion of the Midland Metro. A feasibility study costing £150,000 was conducted, looking at the benefits and drawbacks of a state-of-the-art, £3 billion underground system serving the city. Upon the outcome of the report, the city council backed plans for a street metro system.

Birmingham is the largest city in Europe without an underground rail system.

== Buses and coaches ==
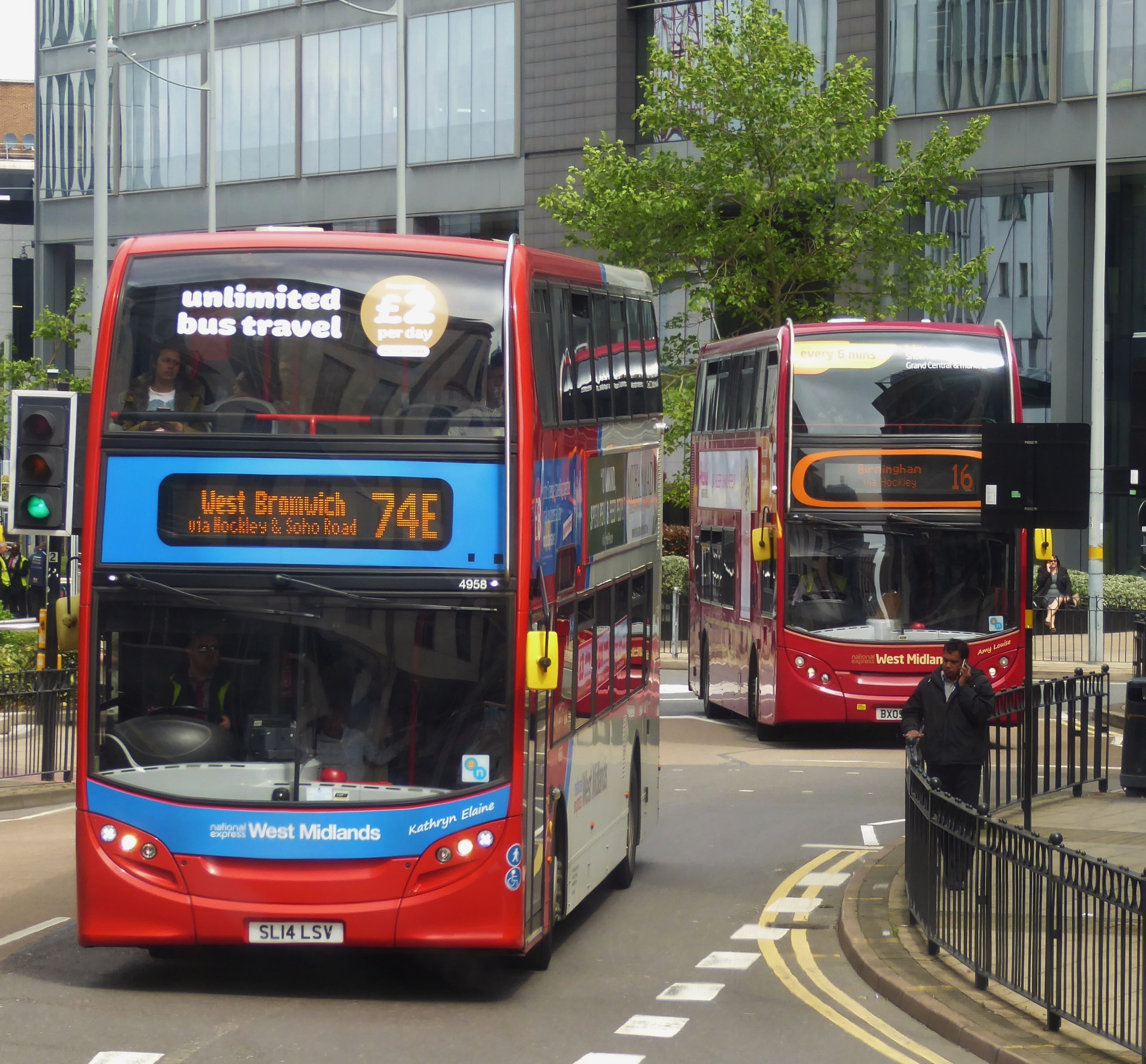
Buses in Birmingham.

Birmingham has an extensive bus network. 84% of public transport use in the West Midlands is by bus. There are approximately 50 operators of registered local bus services in the West Midlands. The largest bus operator in the area is West Midlands Bus, which accounts for over 80% of all journeys. The company changed its name from Travel West Midlands in 2008 as a part of National Express' re-branding. National Express West Midlands operates a large network based on a range of services radiating out of Birmingham City Centre and the route 11 bus service, the longest urban bus service in Europe which chiefly follows the A4040 circular road.

Most of the network is operated on a commercial basis, with some services (usually evenings and Sundays) supported by TfWM. Smaller operators provide a range of services, either in competition with West Midlands Bus or under contract to TfWM. These include Diamond West Midlands and The Green Bus. Medium distance bus services from Birmingham include First Midland Red operating services to Worcester and Redditch. Arriva Midlands operates services to Tamworth and Kingsbury in Staffordshire. Johnsons Coach & Bus Travel operate longer distance bus services from the south of the conurbation such as the 20 to Stratford-upon-Avon and the 150/X50 to Redditch.

Despite the large number of buses serving Birmingham City Centre there is no longer a bus station. Instead buses terminate at bus stops on roads surrounding the city centre which are given codes assigned by area (e.g. Moor Street Interchange = MS*). The airport can also be reached via an express bus service from Coleshill Parkway station, on the Birmingham to Peterborough Line which run four times per hour and take around fifteen minutes. Alternatively, West Midlands Bus runs a regular bus service from the City Centre. The number X1 from Moor Street Queensway to Coventry runs via the airport and the National Exhibition Centre.

Birmingham is also a major hub in the National Express coach network, whose headquarters are in Birmingham. The group operates services from its hub at Birmingham coach station, a new coach station on the site of the former Digbeth coach station. A temporary coach station was located in nearby Oxford Street whilst building work was undertaken. The company's flagship NXL Shuttle service operates services to London with frequent services to all major airports and cities in Britain. Many of these are cross-country services operating from north to south, for which Birmingham provides interchange facilities.

== Roads ==
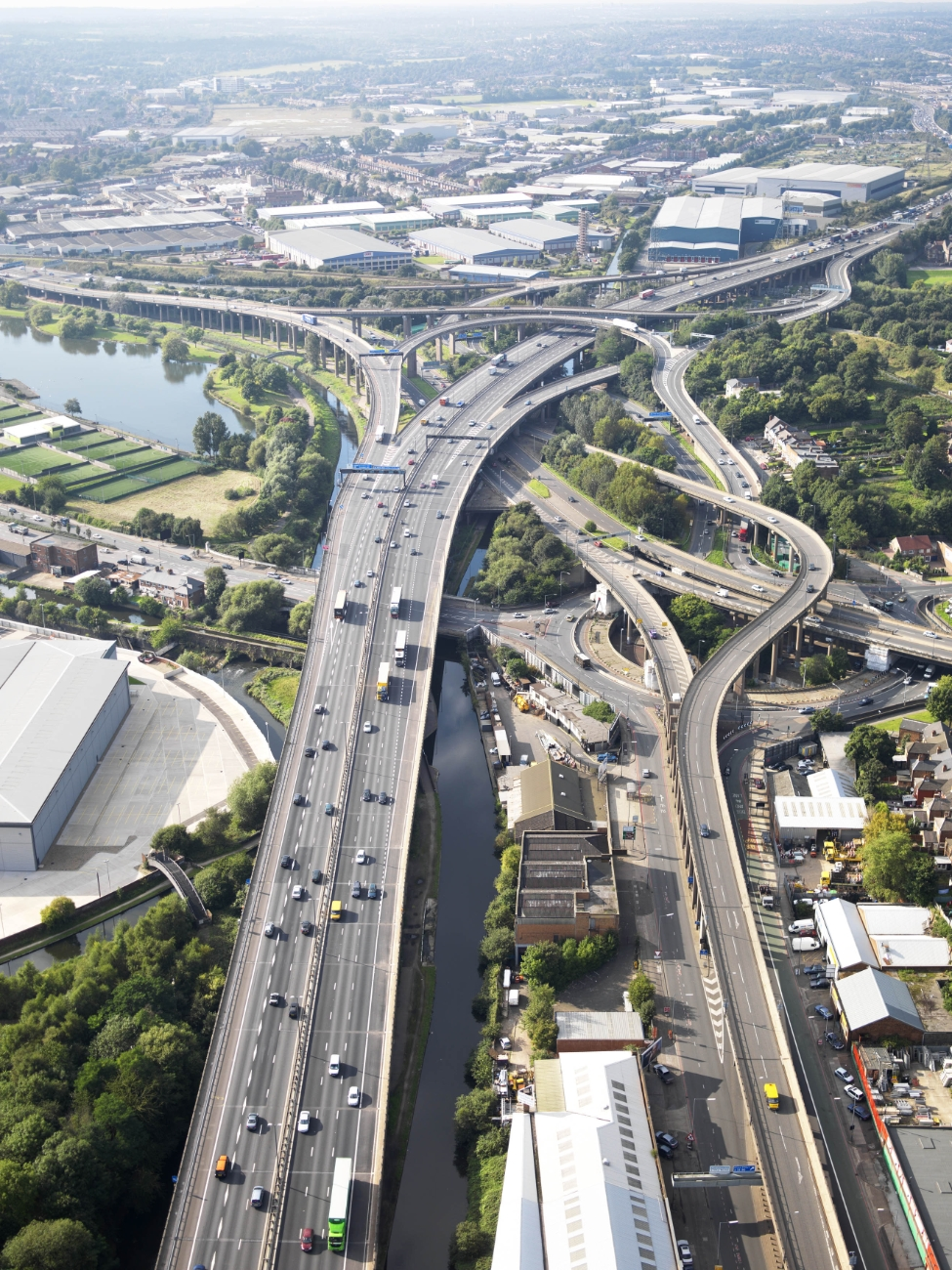
Spaghetti Junction

The M40 motorway connects to London via Oxford. The M6 motorway also connects Birmingham to London (via the M1) and the south, and the north-west of England and Scotland. Junction 6 of the M6 is also one of Birmingham's landmarks, and probably the most notable motorway junction in the UK, Spaghetti Junction, which is officially called the Gravelly Hill Interchange. Other motorways are:

- The A38(M) which links Spaghetti Junction to the city centre
- The M5, connecting Birmingham to the south-west of England
- The M42, which connects Birmingham to Tamworth and the East Midlands
- The M6 Toll, which enables through traffic on the M6 to bypass Birmingham and Wolverhampton.

Birmingham, unlike London and Manchester, does not have a single orbital motorway. Instead, three motorways form a box which surrounds most of the city. These are:

- The M42 which forms the southern and eastern sections. In the middle, the M40 terminates, which has its junction built with priority for traffic going from the M40 to the M42 west, instead of M42 east-west priority. The M40 goes off south to Warwick, Oxford, High Wycombe, Uxbridge and London.
- The M5 which forms the western section.
- The M6 which forms the northern section. The M5 terminates on the M6.

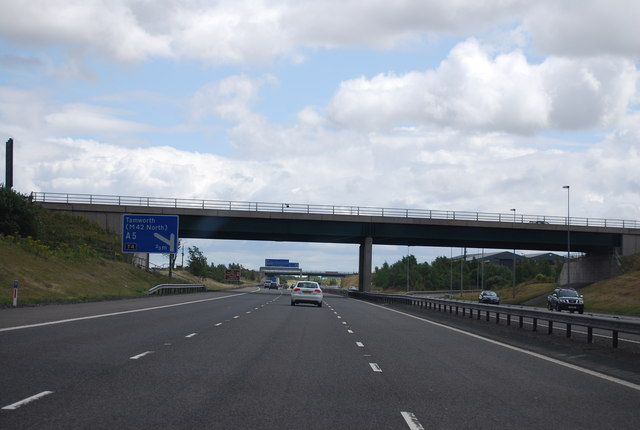
Birmingham Road bridge, M6.

Other major roads passing through Birmingham include:

- The A34 from Manchester to Winchester
- The A38 from Mansfield to Bodmin
- The A41 from London to Birkenhead
- The A45 from Birmingham to Thrapston (formerly to Felixstowe)
- The A47 from Birmingham to Great Yarmouth
- The A4540 'Middleway' ring road
- The A4040 Outer Ring Road

=== Clean Air Zone ===
Birmingham introduced a Clean Air Zone on 1 June 2021, which charges polluting vehicles to travel into the city centre (all roads within the A4540 ring road). Poor air quality kills around 900 people a year in Birmingham and the government has ordered the city to reduce pollution. The daily charge is £8 for petrol cars built before 2006 and diesel cars built before 2015, and £50 for lorries and coaches. The money is used to improve public transport, for example, the three new stations on the Camp Hill Line were partly funded by money from the Clean Air Zone.

=== Cycling ===
Sustrans' National Cycle Route 5 goes through central Birmingham, connecting with National Cycle Route 81 at Smethwick. National Cycle Route 535 from Sutton Coldfield terminates just north of Birmingham Snow Hill railway station.

In 2026, Lime launched a cycle and scooter hire scheme involving over 2,000 bikes, 500 e-scooters and 43 docking stations across the West Midlands, including central Birmingham. However, dedicated cycling infrastructure remains relatively scarce in suburban areas of Birmingham.

== Air ==
=== History ===
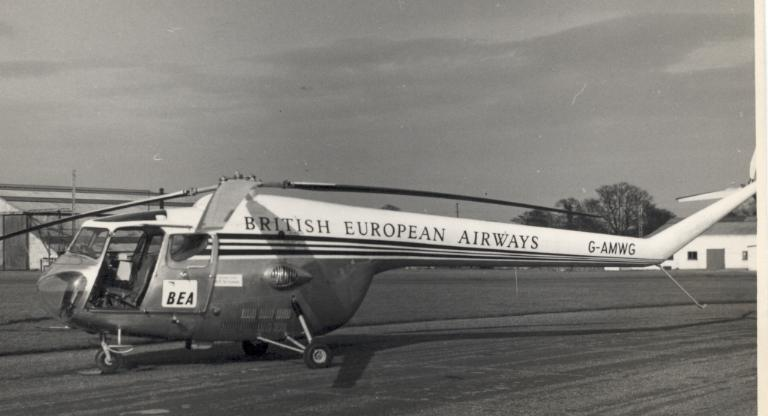
British European Airways' Bristol 171 Mk 3A at London Gatwick on the scheduled passenger service from Birmingham in 1955

The first flight from Birmingham was made by a Mr, Harper in a hot air balloon belonging to James Sadler, on 4 January 1785, landing some 50 miles away, near Newcastle-under-Lyme. During the flight, which Harper reported had reached a height of 4,300 feet (1,300 m), he collected samples of air at the request of Joseph Priestley, but the glass bottles were broken during his rough landing. On returning to Birmingham the next day, Harper was given a hero's welcome.

Birmingham's first airport was Castle Bromwich Aerodrome, which operated from 1909 to 1958. Another opened as Elmdon Airport on 8 July 1939 and continues to operate, as Birmingham Airport. A heliport, Hay Mills Rotor Station, operated passenger services to London from 1951 to 1952, with freight flights continuing until 1954. Another operated adjacent to Baskerville House in the 1950s.

=== Current ===
Birmingham is served by Birmingham Airport in the Borough of Solihull to the east of Birmingham, which is the seventh-busiest (2013) by passenger traffic in the UK. The airport is served by the railway network at Birmingham International railway station, nearby in the same Borough. The airport and railway station are linked by the 585 m (1,919 ft) AirRail Link, originally a Maglev system, since converted to a cable-hauled SkyRail people mover. Train services are provided by Avanti West Coast, CrossCountry, Transport for Wales and West Midlands Trains.

Bus services operate from the airport to Coleshill Parkway railway station on the Birmingham – Leicester railway line. This link improves access to the East Midlands as well as providing further links to North Warwickshire and South-east Staffordshire.

The airport has two major bus services running into Birmingham: the X1 (Birmingham – Airport – Coventry), which operates 24 hours a day and X12 bus (Birmingham - Chelmsley Wood– Airport – Solihull). The majority of bus services from the airport are run by National Express West Midlands (formerly known as Travel West Midlands) with other Warwickshire-funded services such as the 75.

== Canals ==
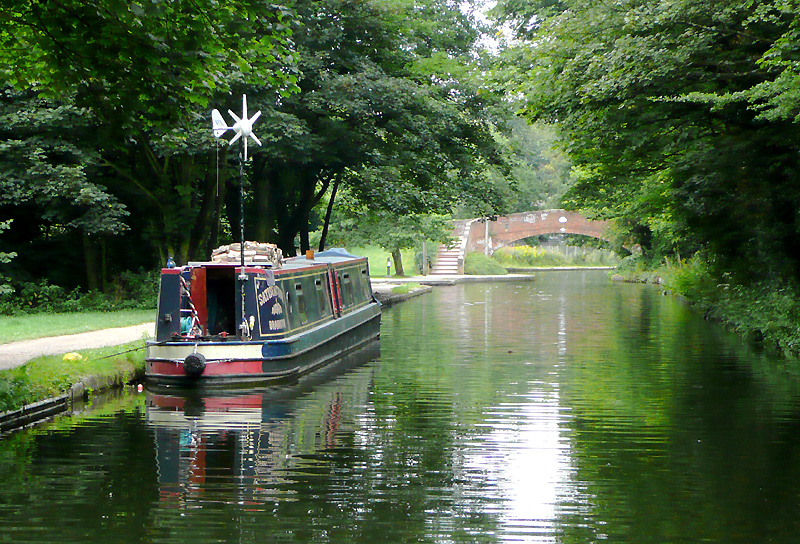
Worcester and Birmingham Canal

Birmingham's canal network was built during the Industrial Revolution to transport heavy goods and the city remains at the hub of the country's canal network. Canals run for 35 miles (56 km) within the city, of which most are still navigable. Birmingham is often lauded as having more miles of canal than Venice, true by a margin of 9 miles (14 km). Birmingham however includes many semi-urban parts and is a far larger city than Venice making for a much lower canal density (concentration). The type of waterway is inland providing the main access to few properties. This contrasts to Venice's broad coastal canals providing the main means of access, surrounded by a lagoon of the Adriatic Sea. By water volume (taking into account depths), Birmingham has more cubic metres of water in its canals than any other city in the world.

Extensive regeneration of canals has taken place since the 1980s, including dredging to enable the smooth passage of narrowboats, reconstruction and construction of canalside housing. 2010s developments include the Eastside area of Digbeth and the area within Icknield Port Loop.

Canals in Birmingham include:

- Birmingham Canal Navigations network, including the BCN Main Line and the Birmingham and Fazeley Canal
- Worcester & Birmingham Canal (parts of)
- The Grand Union Canal (parts of)

Birmingham has reservoirs to feed its canals, including:

- Edgbaston Reservoir
- Lifford Reservoir

There are no navigable rivers: the Rea, on which the city was founded, is little more than a culverted stream, and the Tame, which passes through some northern suburbs, is not navigable. The River Cole, which runs through the south-east of the city through to the north-west, is too shallow for anything bigger than a raft.

== Birmingham public transport statistics ==
There were 247 million bus journeys in 2024/25, an increase of 14.8 million from the previous year. 9 million people used trams that year, a slight increase on the year before, and 65.8 million rail journeys. Further plans have been made to expand the single line tram to a large network. The train stations with the highest occupancy are Dorridge and Lea Hall, at 82.1% and 81.9% respectively. Through 2024 new electric trains were being brought into service on the Wolverhampton-Walsall (via Birmingham) route, and Cross City line, to replace the previous electric trains. The new trains offer a more spacious 2+2 seating layout instead of the previous 3+2 configuration.
