= Keith Sinclair (bishop) =

British Anglican retired bishop (born 1952)

The Right Reverend Keith Sinclair
- Bishop of Birkenhead
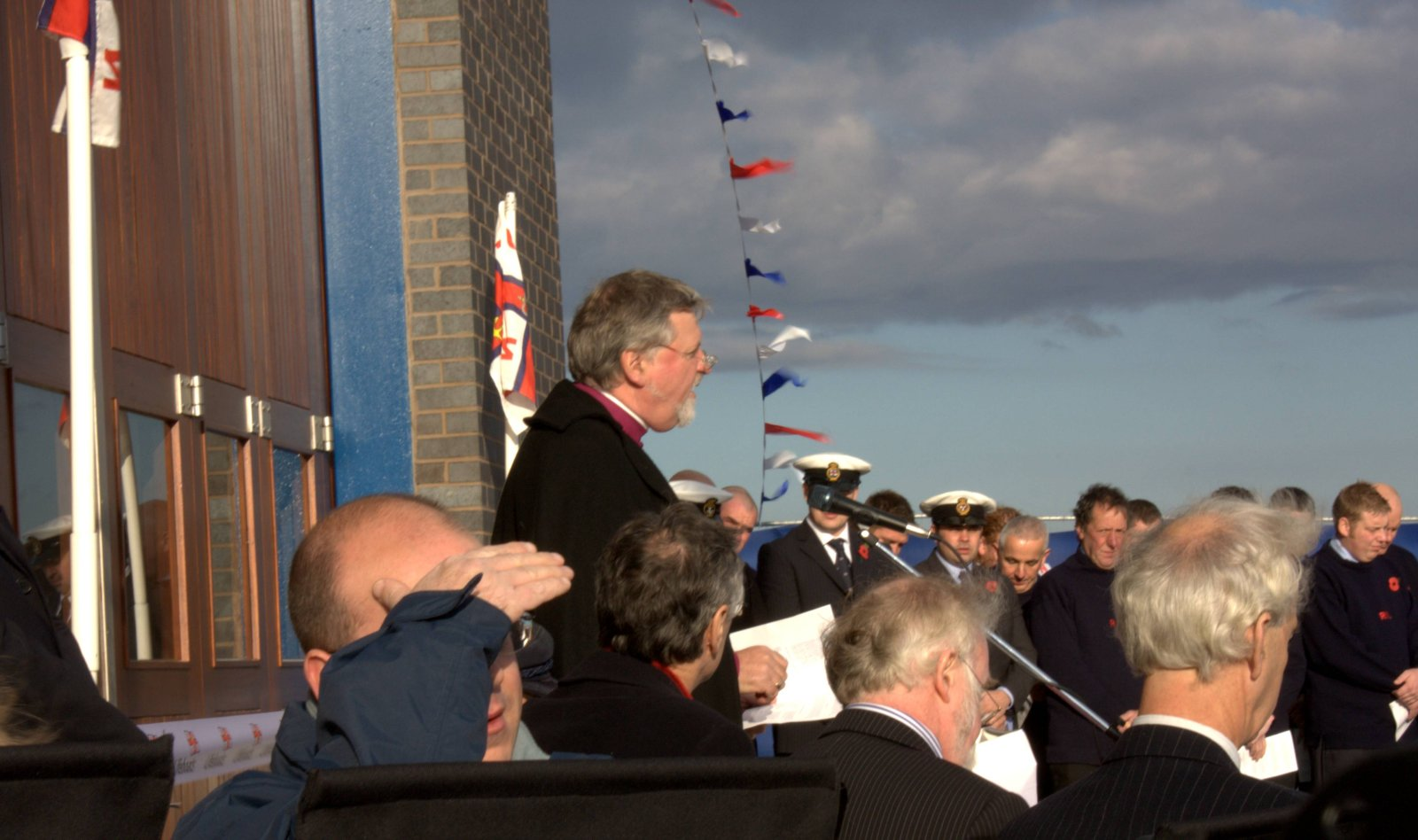
- Sinclair at a dedication ceremony in 2008
- Church: Church of England
- Diocese: Diocese of Chester
- In office: 2007–2021
- Predecessor: David Urquhart

Orders
- Ordination: 1 July 1984 (deacon); 30 June 1985 (priest) by Hugh Montefiore
- Consecration: 8 March 2007 by John Sentamu

Personal details
- Born: 3 December 1952 (age 73)
- Denomination: Anglican
- Spouse: Rosie (m. 1989)
- Children: 3
- Education: Christ Church, Oxford; Cranmer Hall, Durham

Gordon Keith Sinclair (born 3 December 1952) is a British Anglican retired bishop. From 2007 until 2021, he served as the Bishop of Birkenhead, one of two suffragan bishops in the Church of England Diocese of Chester.

== Early life and education ==
Sinclair was born on 3 December 1952 to Donald and Joyce Sinclair. He was educated at Trinity School, an all-boys private school in Croydon, London. He studied at Christ Church, Oxford, graduating with a Bachelor of Arts (BA) degree; as per tradition, his BA was later promoted to an Oxford Master of Arts (MA Oxon) degree. He then worked as a solicitor.

Sinclair entered Cranmer Hall, Durham, an Evangelical Anglican theological college, to train for the ministry. During this time he studied theology and graduated with BA degree from Durham University in 1984.

== Ordained ministry ==
Sinclair was ordained in the Church of England: made a deacon at Petertide 1984 (1 July) and ordained a priest the Petertide following (30 June 1985) – both times by Hugh Montefiore, Bishop of Birmingham, at Birmingham Cathedral. From 1984 to 1988, he served his curacy at Christ Church, Summerfield in the Diocese of Birmingham. He was additionally a part-time chaplain at the Birmingham Children's Hospital. Then, from 1988 to 2001, he was vicar of the Church of SS Peter & Paul, Aston. He was also the area dean of Aston and an honorary canon of Birmingham Cathedral between 2000 and 2001. He moved to the Diocese of Coventry, and served as vicar of Holy Trinity Church, Coventry from 2001 to 2007.

=== Episcopal ministry ===
Sinclair was consecrated a bishop on 8 March 2007 by John Sentamu, Archbishop of York, at York Minster. From then until retirement, he served as the Bishop of Birkenhead, one of two suffragan bishops in the Diocese of Chester. He retired as bishop effective 8 March 2021, the 14th anniversary of his consecration.

Since 27 April 2021, he has served as National Director of the Church of England Evangelical Council (CEEC). He has been an honorary assistant bishop in the Diocese of Manchester since shortly after retiring as Bishop of Birkenhead.

== Beliefs ==
Sinclair is on the council of reference of the True Freedom Trust. Its vision is to uphold traditional biblical teaching on sexual relationships and gender and to do so with "understanding and compassion, so that Christians who struggle with same-sex attractions or gender identity gain increasing acceptance, wholeness and maturity in faith within their local church."

Sinclair was one of the bishops selected to be a member of the Church of England working group on human sexuality which in 2013 produced the Pilling Report. The report acknowledges the complexity of the issue stating: "This report cannot attempt a definitive account of the debate about the meaning of Scripture, even if such an enterprise were conceivable." Two essays are appended to the Report: One, by Sinclair, epitomises a conservative understanding of the biblical texts; the other by David Runcorn argues a scriptural case for a more inclusive ethic. The report, by way of explanation for the essays, states: "We include these two contributions, not because they sum up the whole range of scriptural scholarship on this subject — they emphatically do not — but because they epitomise the way in which study of the same sources can lead to very different conclusions."

He is a member of the Church of England Evangelical Council (CEEC) for the Province of York.

In July 2024, he was commissioned by the Church of England Evangelical Council as an "overseer" to provided alternative spiritual oversight (not to be confused with the Church of England's official alternative episcopal oversight) to evangelical clergy and parishes in the Church of England who maintain traditional teaching on the doctrine of marriage and sexual ethics, following the General Synod's support for the introduction of a service of blessing for same sex couples.

== Personal life ==
Sinclair has been married since 1989 and they have three children. He is a keen walker and his brother is the actor Malcolm Sinclair.

== Styles ==
- The Reverend Keith Sinclair (1984–2000; 2001–2007)
- The Reverend Canon Keith Sinclair (2000–2001)
- The Right Reverend Keith Sinclair (2007–present)

Church of England titles
Preceded by David Urquhart	Bishop of Birkenhead; 2007–2021	TBA
