= Rotton Park =

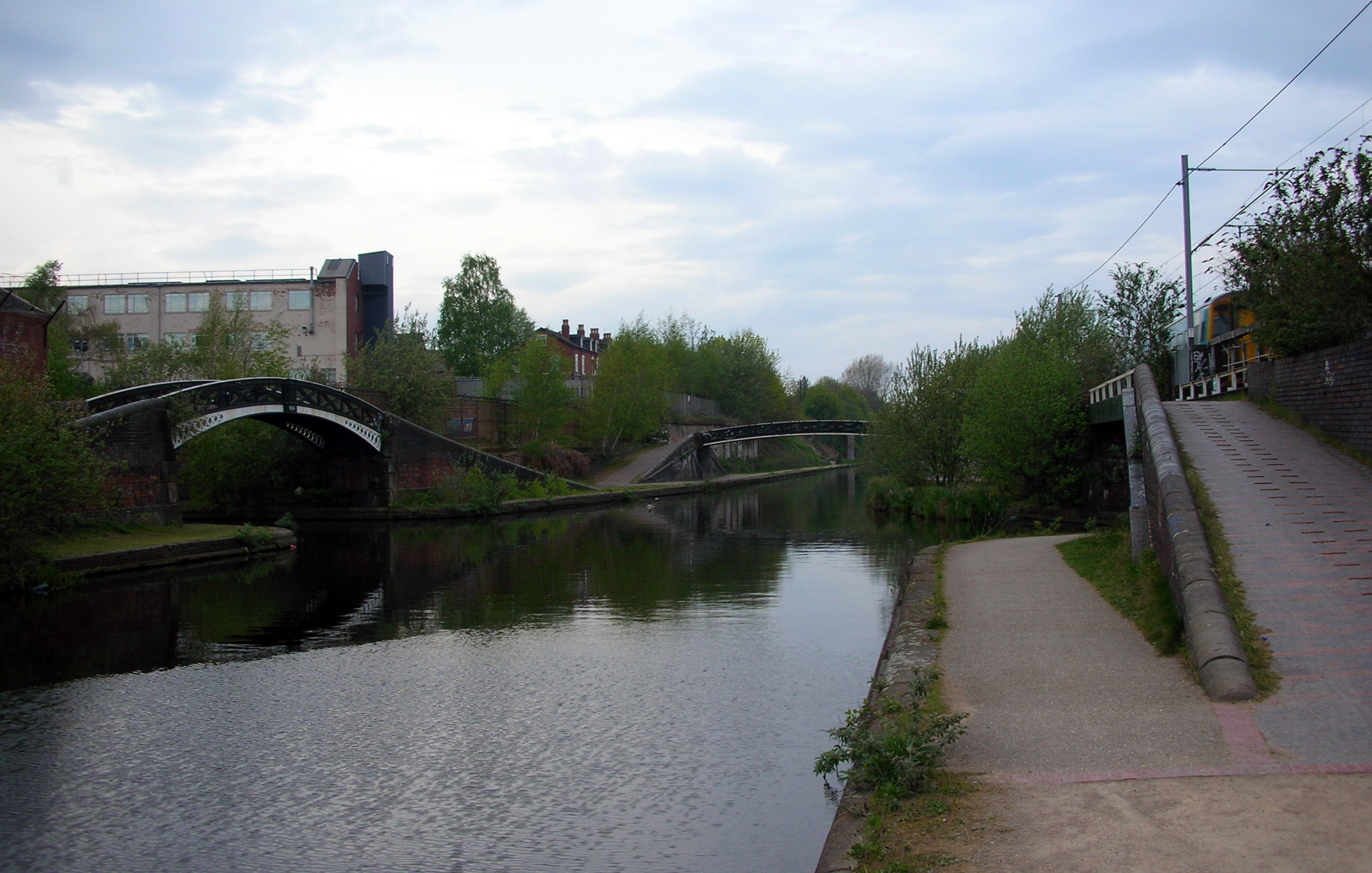

- Location within West Midlands county
- Coordinates: 52°28′47″N 1°56′13″W
- Country: England
- County: West Midlands
- City: Birmingham

Rotton Park is an area of Birmingham, England, encompassing the north of Edgbaston Ward and the southern extremes of Soho Ward, to the city boundary with Smethwick.

== Name ==
Sources differ as to the origin of the name. Some claim it is derived from the Rotton family, (Ambrose and Bridget Rotton built a surviving timber-framed house, now known as Stratford House, at Camp Hill, in 1601.) Others say it is derived from the Anglo-Saxon 'rot tun', meaning 'cheerful farm'.

== History ==
The first recorded use of the name was in 1275. A 1307 document refers to "Parc de Rotton juxta [near] Birmingham". In 1826, Thomas Telford built Edgbaston Reservoir, then known as Rotton Park Reservoir, by damming a small stream. Local land agent John Chesshire built a large house for the wealthy banker Samuel Jones Lloyd, Lord Overstone in the 1850s. The estate included detached villas in Montague, Vernon and Clarendon Roads. One villa was named after Joseph Gillott's youngest son. St Augustine's Church near Hagley Road was built in 1868 to a design by architect J. A. Chatwin.

For a time, Birmingham City Council had a Rotton Park Ward. Edward Marks stood as a Liberal candidate for the ward in 1911.

== Landmarks ==
Edgbaston Reservoir and the adjacent Icknield Port Loop (originally called Rotton Park Loop) of the Birmingham Canal Navigations. The name is also found in Rotton Park Road, site of the former Rotton Park Road railway station. On City Road, (the A4040 road) which passes through Rotton Park, are the churches City Road Methodist Church and City Road Baptist Church. The Anglican Christ Church Summerfield is on Gillott Road near the reservoir.
