= Summerfield, Birmingham =

Summerfield
- District
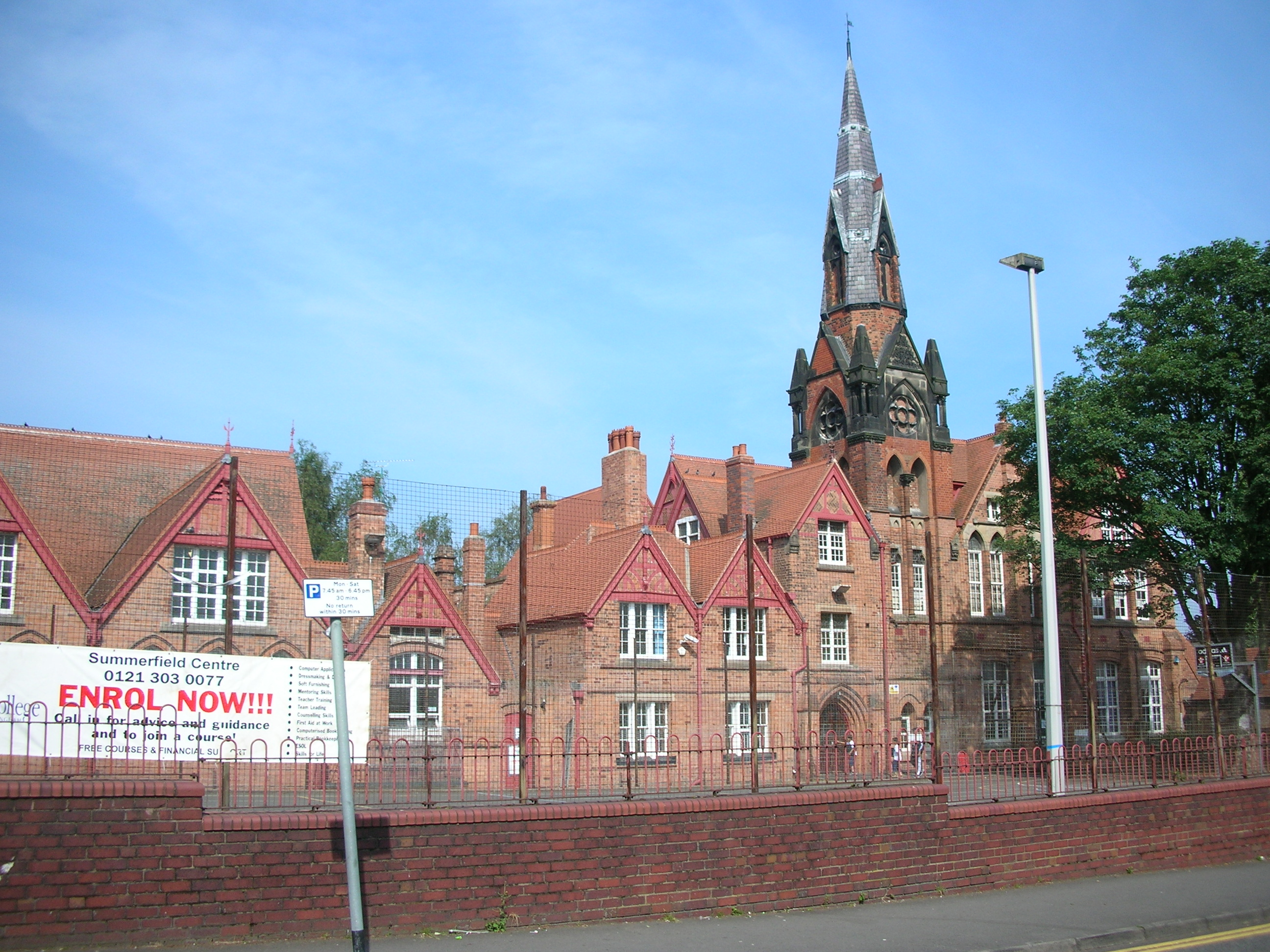
- The former Summerfield School
- Interactive map of Summerfield
- Coordinates: 52.48403°N 1.94025°W
- Country: United Kingdom
- County: West Midlands
- City: Birmingham

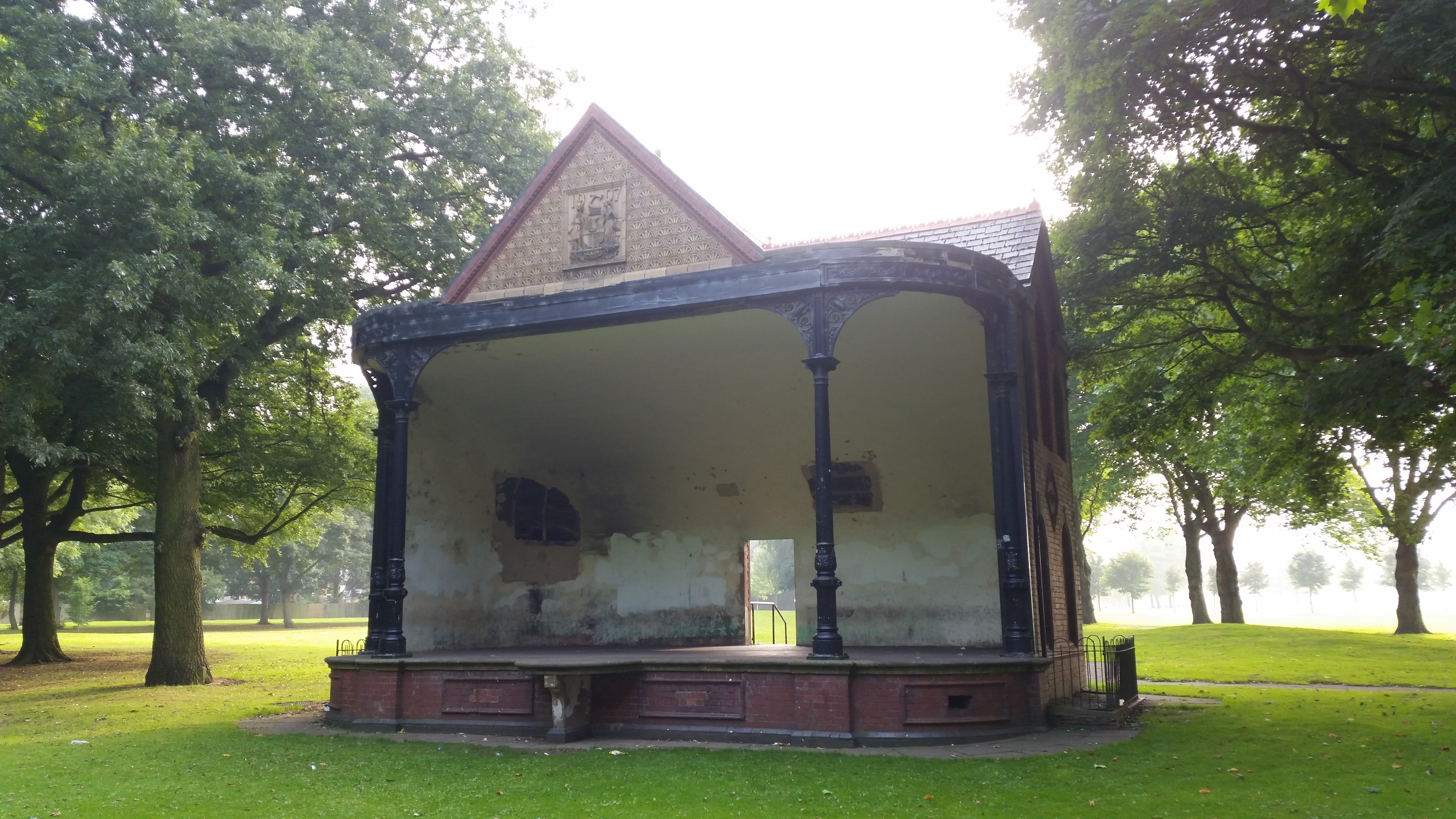
Summerfield Park bandstand

Summerfield is an area of Birmingham, England, two miles west of the city centre. It is also the name of an ecclesiastical parish. The area takes its name from Summerfield House, owned by members of the Chance family, local industrialists. Neighbouring areas are Cape Hill, Edgbaston, Ladywood, Rotton Park and Winson Green. Edgbaston Reservoir is immediately to the south.

== Summerfield Park ==
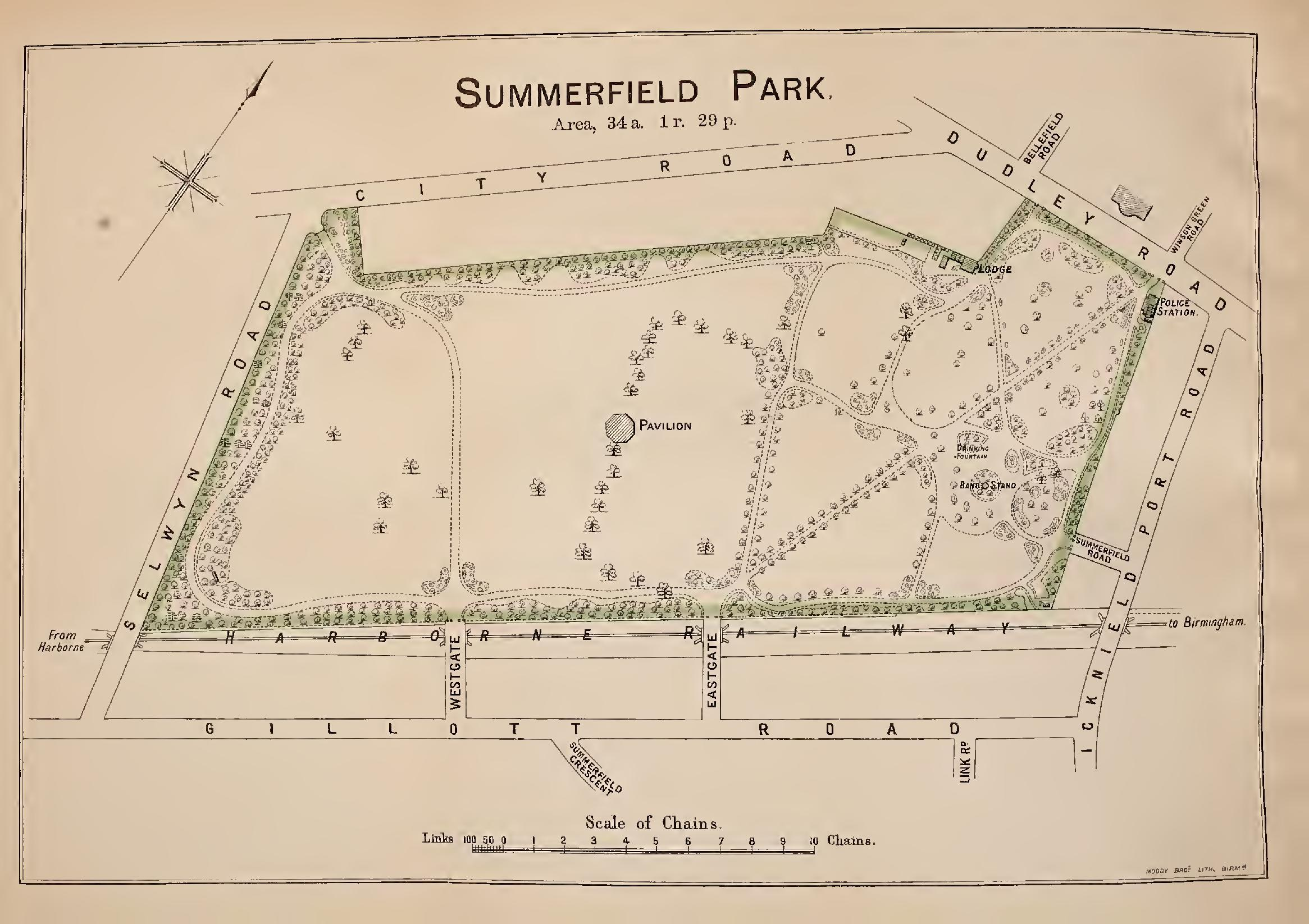
1892 plan of Summerfield Park

Summerfield House and grounds were acquired by Birmingham Corporation, who laid out a public park, which was opened on 29 July 1876 by the Mayor of Birmingham, Alderman George Baker. The park, originally of 12 acres (4.9 ha) was increased in size in 1890 and 1892, but the house had been demolished by 1894. Summerfield was the sixth municipal park opened in Birmingham after Adderley Park, Calthorpe Park, Aston Park, Cannon Hill Park and Highgate Park. From 1968 to 1970 the park was the venue for an annual one day international jazz festival organised by the city council. Musicians appearing included bands led by Chris Barber, Humphrey Lyttleton and Monty Sunshine. The park hosted council run Guy Fawkes night bonfire and fireworks 'carnivals' from 1961 until the early 1980s. Summerfield Park has an area of 25 acres (10 ha) and features a bandstand built in 1907. The former Summerfield police station on Dudley Road stands beside the park.

== Governance ==
Summerfield forms part of North Edgbaston ward for elections to Birmingham city council.

== Roads and rail ==
Major roads in the area include Dudley Road, City Road (part of the city's ring road, the A4040), Rotton Park Road, and Icknield Port Road. Gillott Road is named after industrialist and pen maker Joseph Gillott, who built houses in the area.

The area was formerly served by Icknield Port Road railway station and Rotton Park Road railway station, on the London and North Western Railway's Harborne branch line, but the stations closed in 1931 and 1934 respectively. The trackbed now forms part of the Harborne Walkway.

== Listed buildings ==
Opposite Summerfield Park on Dudley Road stands the grade II* listed former board school built in 1878 and designed by Martin & Chamberlain in their 'house' style. It could accommodate up to a total of 1,220 boys, girls and infants. The tower was for ventilation. The school closed in 1979, after 101 years and pupils moved to a new site. Since then, the buildings have been put to use for a community centre.

The parish church, Christ Church, is Grade II listed.
