= Monument station (disambiguation) =

Monument station is a London Underground station in the City of London.

Monument station may also refer to:

- Monument Metro station, a Tyne and Wear Metro in Newcastle, England
- Monument station (Massachusetts), a former railway station in Monument, Massachusetts
- Monument Lane railway station, a former railway station in Birmingham, England

== See also ==
- Monumento station, a Manila LRT station in Caloocan
