= Hagley Road railway station =

Railway station in Birmingham, England

Hagley Road

General information
- Location: Edgbaston, Birmingham; England
- Coordinates: 52.4733°N 1.9536°W
- Grid reference: SP032861
- Platforms: 1

Other information
- Status: Disused

History
- Original company: Harborne Railway
- Pre-grouping: London and North Western Railway
- Post-grouping: London, Midland and Scottish Railway

Key dates
- 10 August 1874: Opened
- 26 November 1934: Closed to passengers
- 3 November 1963: Closed
Location

Hagley Road railway station was a railway station in Birmingham, England, built by the Harborne Railway and operated by the London and North Western Railway in 1874. In addition to the passenger facilities, there was also a goods yard and a coal wharf.

It served part of the Edgbaston area of Birmingham and was located between Hagley Road and Station Avenue.

The station closed to passenger traffic in 1934, though it was open to goods traffic until 1963.

There is little evidence of the station on the ground today. The trackbed through the station is now part of the Harborne Nature Walk.

| Preceding station | Disused railways | Following station |
|---|---|---|
| Harborne | Harborne Railway; Harborne Branch Line | Rotton Park Road |
