= Rotton Park Road railway station =

Former railway station in England

Rotton Park Road
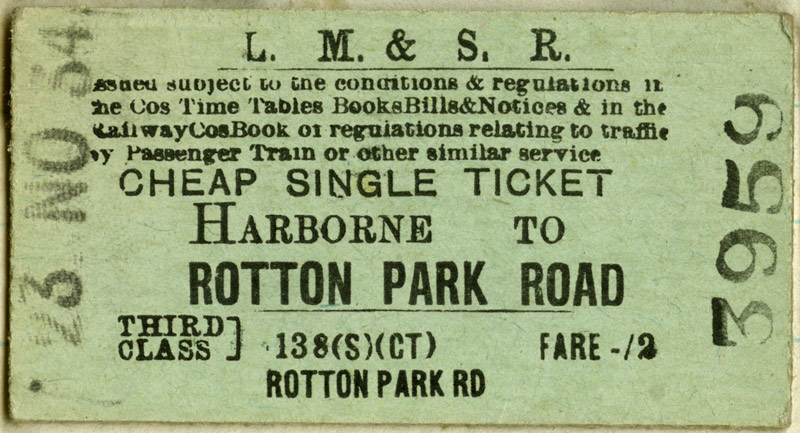
- 1934 ticket

General information
- Location: Edgbaston, Birmingham; England
- Coordinates: 52.4805°N 1.9460°W
- Grid reference: SP037869
- Platforms: 2

Other information
- Status: Disused

History
- Original company: Harborne Railway
- Pre-grouping: London and North Western Railway
- Post-grouping: London, Midland and Scottish Railway

Key dates
- 1874: Opened
- 1934: Closed
Location

Rotton Park Road railway station was a railway station in England, built by the Harborne Railway and operated by the London and North Western Railway in 1874.

It served Summerfield and part of the Edgbaston area of Birmingham and was located near to the junction of Rotton Park Road and Gillott Road.

Initially single track, the steady growth in traffic meant that a passing loop was installed in 1903, when a spur to Mitchells & Butlers Brewery was also added. However, from the beginning of the 20th century, the introduction of road transport, especially Birmingham Corporation Tramways, caused passenger numbers to fall away.

In 1923, the Harborne Railway, together with its operators the LNWR, became part of the London Midland and Scottish Railway (LMS) at the grouping. The station closed in 1934, and there is little evidence of the station on the ground today. The trackbed through the station is now part of the Harborne Nature Walk.

Preceding station	Disused railways	Following station
Hagley Road	Harborne Railway; Harborne Branch Line	Icknield Port Road
