= Monument Lane railway station =

Former railway station in England

Monument Lane
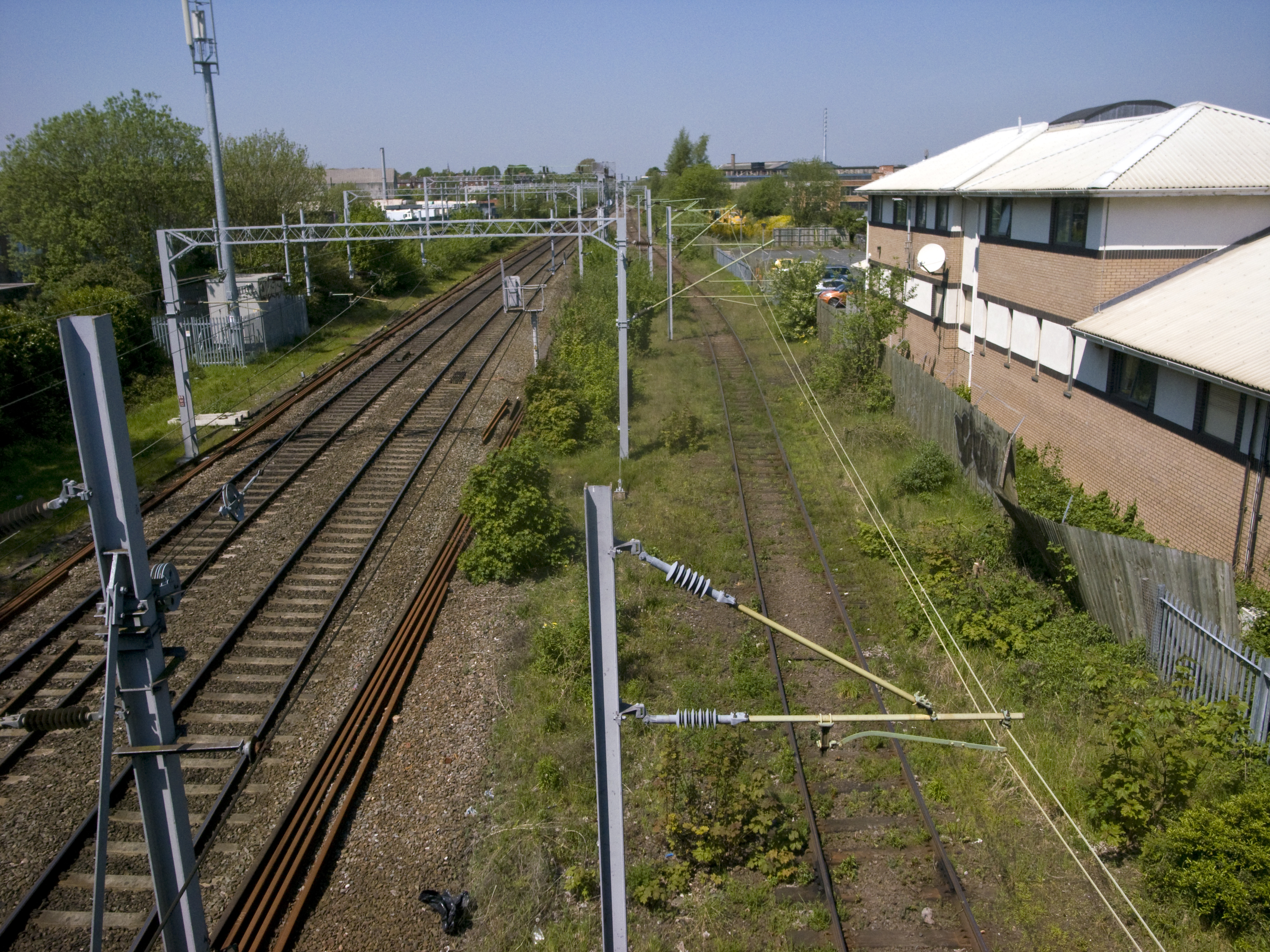
- Site of station — central platform ran between tracks

General information
- Location: Ladywood, Birmingham; England
- Coordinates: 52.4822°N 1.9247°W
- Grid reference: SP052871
- Platforms: 2

Other information
- Status: Disused

History
- Pre-grouping: London and North Western Railway
- Post-grouping: London, Midland and Scottish Railway

Key dates
- July 1854: Opened as Edgbaston
- 1 February 1874: Renamed Monument Lane
- 1886: Resited
- 17 November 1958: Closed
Location

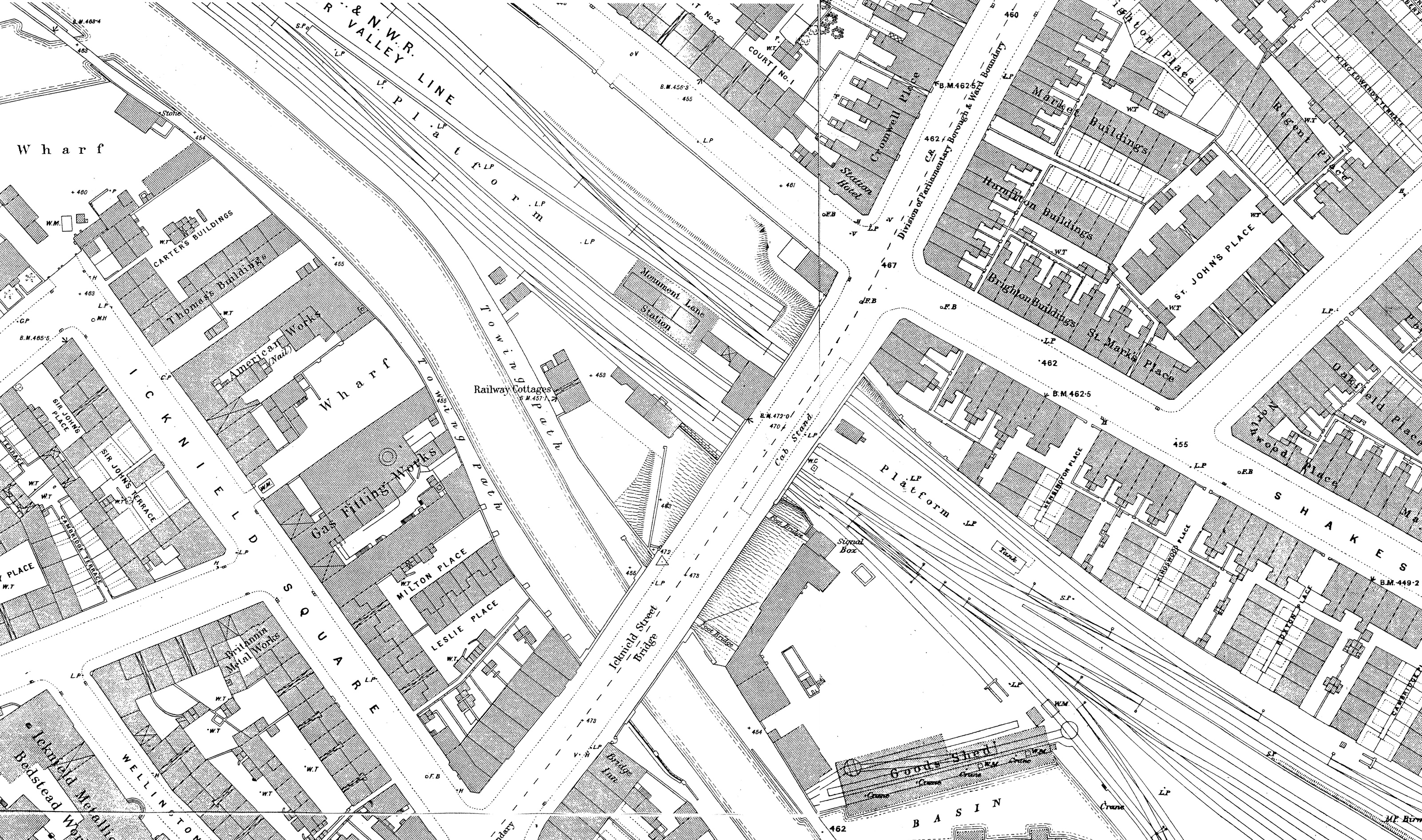
1888-9 map of location of the former station

Monument Lane railway station was a railway station in Birmingham, England, built by the London and North Western Railway on their Stour Valley Line in 1854. It served the Ladywood area of Birmingham, it was also the site of a large goods yard and a locomotive shed. In 1886, the station was rebuilt just north of the original station.

Originally opened as Edgbaston, the station was renamed Monument Lane in 1874. The station closed in 1958, although the Rugby–Birmingham–Stafford line loop from the West Coast Main Line still runs through the site of the station today. Monument Lane goods yard was adjacent to the East, as was an engine shed with turntable.

There is some evidence of the station on the ground today, as there is a gap in the tracks running currently through the site at the location of an island platform. There were calls for a new station to be built at this site to serve the International Convention Centre but this seems unlikely to happen owing to the Midland Metro extension now running to Centenary Square.

Preceding station	Disused railways	Following station
Winson Green	London and North Western Railway; Stour Valley Line	Birmingham New Street
Icknield Port Road	Harborne Railway; Harborne Branch Line	Birmingham New Street
