= Christ Church, Summerfield =

Christ Church
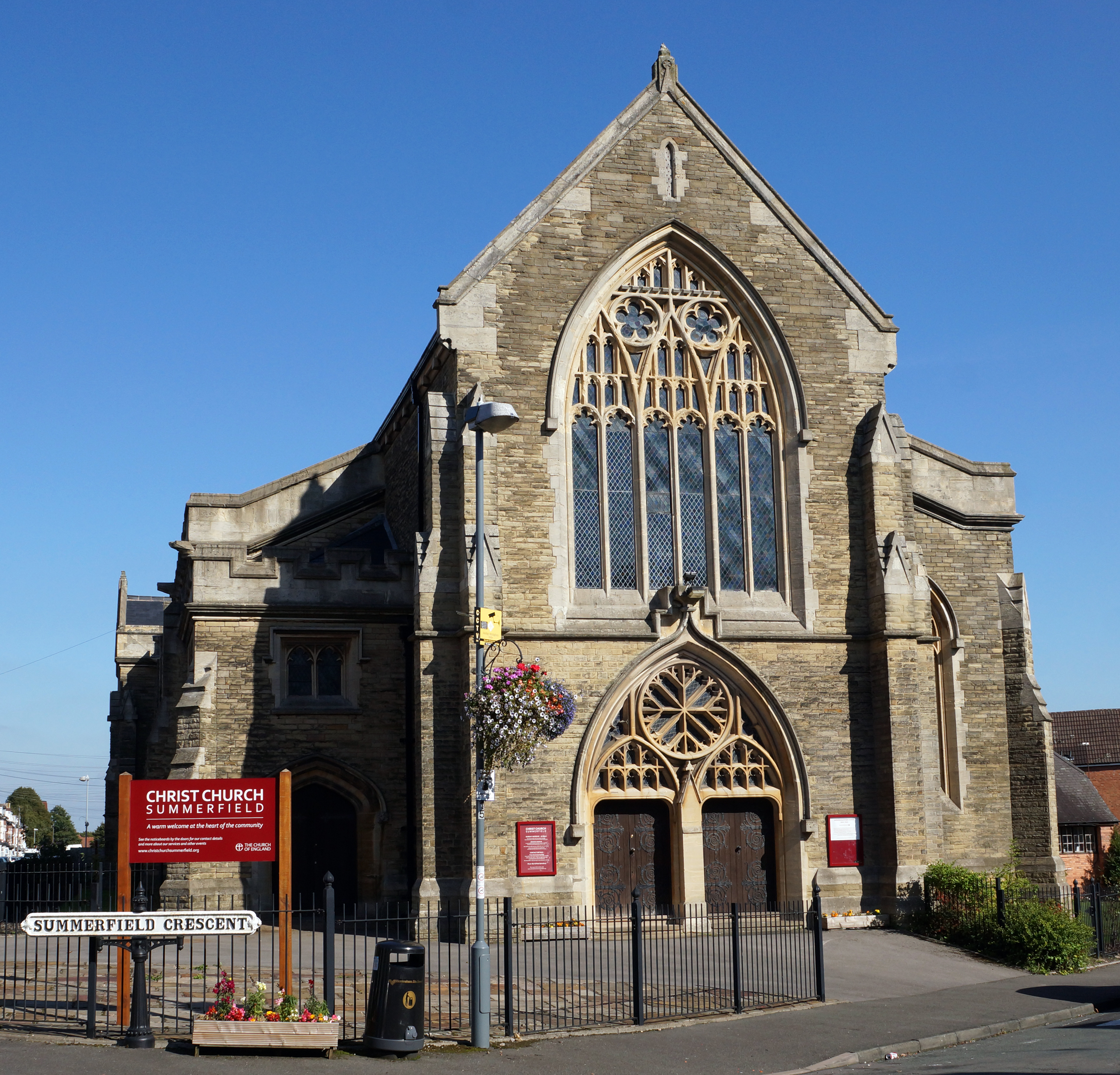
- Christ Church
- 52°28′56.6″N 1°56′20.8″W
- OS grid reference: SP 04230 87161
- Location: Summerfield, Birmingham
- Country: England
- Denomination: Church of England
- Website: www.christchurchsummerfield.com

History
- Dedication: Christ Church
- Consecrated: 30 April 1885

Architecture
- Heritage designation: Grade II listed
- Architect: J. A. Chatwin
- Style: Perpendicular
- Groundbreaking: 1883
- Completed: 1885

Administration
- Diocese: Anglican Diocese of Birmingham
- Archdeaconry: Birmingham
- Deanery: Edgbaston
- Parish: Summerfield

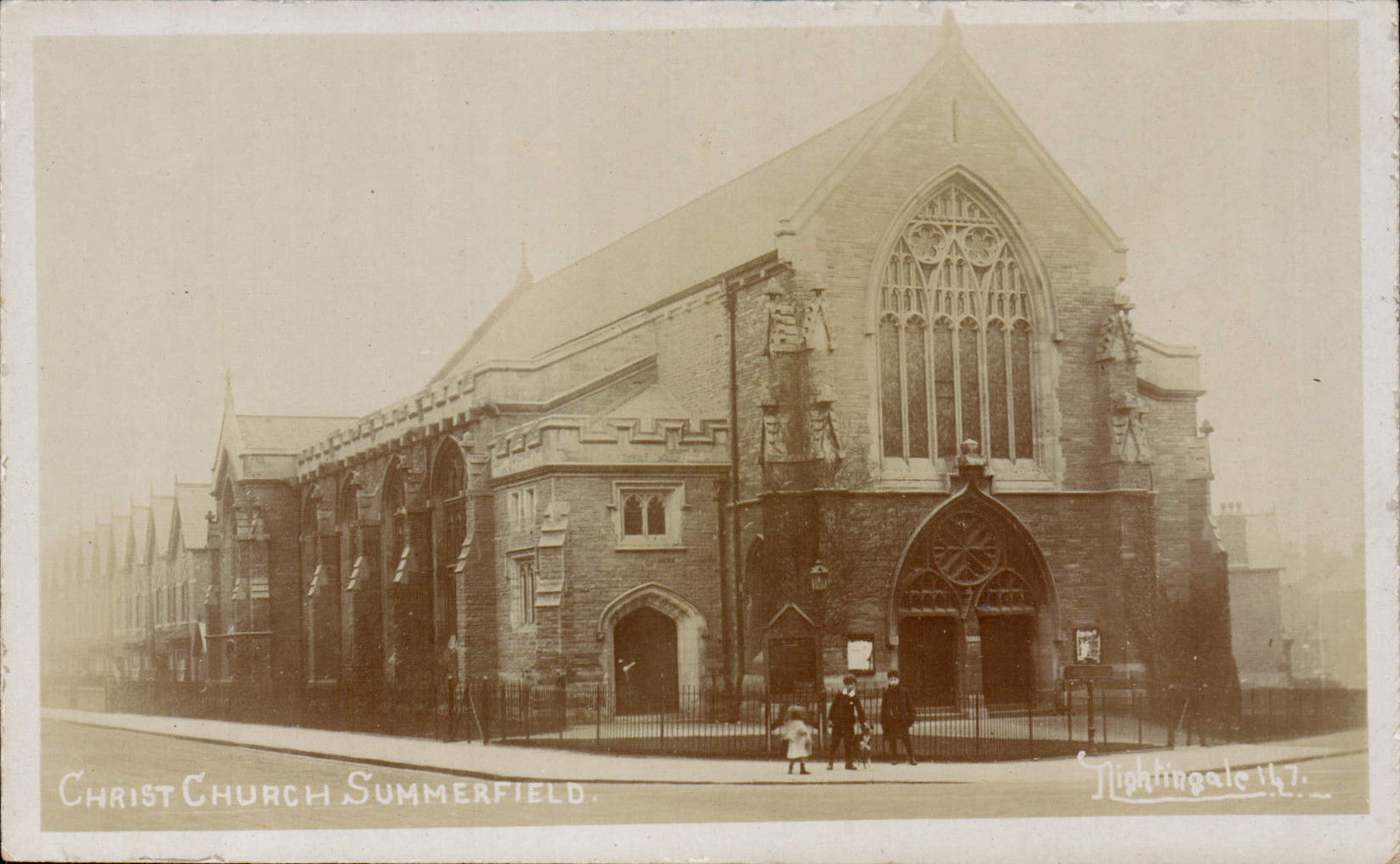
The church circa 1906-1912

Christ Church is a Grade II listed parish church in the Church of England in the Summerfield district of Birmingham. Christ Church is a multi-generational, multi-ethnic church community.

== History ==
The foundation stone was laid in November 1883 by the widow of Revd George Lea, vicar of St George's Church, Edgbaston. The church was built between 1883 and 1885 in a Perpendicular Style to designs by the architect J.A. Chatwin. It was consecrated on 30 April 1885.

A parish was created out of the parish of St John's Church, Ladywood. In 1906 part of the parish was transferred to St Augustine's Church, Edgbaston.

== Organ ==
The organ was installed by Nicholson and Co in 1889. A specification of the organ can be found on the National Pipe Organ Register.

== The community today ==
The worshipping community meet weekly on Sunday mornings with kids and youth groups. As of September 2022, their lead pastors are Rev Dr Katie Stock and Rev Edd Stock.
