= Icknield Port Road railway station =

Former railway station in Birmingham, England

Icknield Port Road
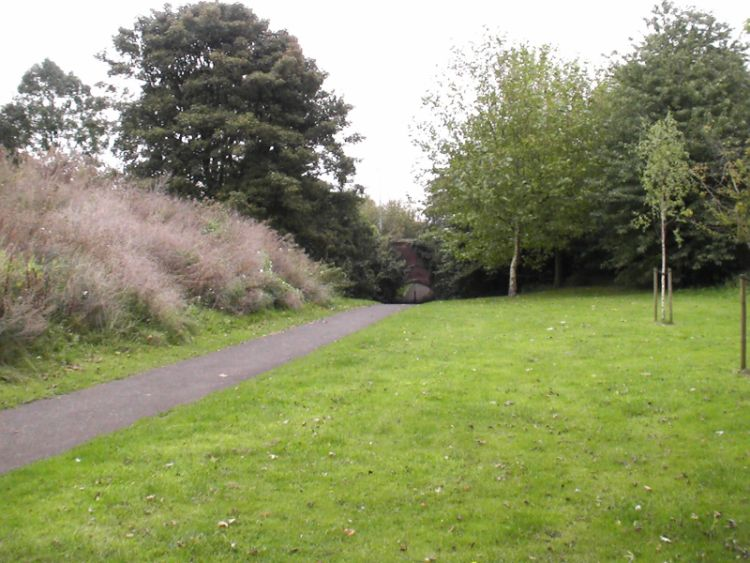
- Site of Icknield Port Road Station in Summerfield Park

General information
- Location: Edgbaston, Birmingham; England
- Coordinates: 52.4845°N 1.9373°W
- Grid reference: SP043874
- Platforms: 2

Other information
- Status: Disused

History
- Original company: Harborne Railway
- Pre-grouping: London and North Western Railway
- Post-grouping: London, Midland and Scottish Railway

Key dates
- 10 August 1874: Opened
- 18 May 1931: Closed
Location

Icknield Port Road railway station was a railway station in England, built by the Harborne Railway and operated by the London and North Western Railway in 1874.

It served the Summerfield area of Birmingham and, from 1897, was located near to the junction of Icknield Port Road and Gillott Road. Prior to that it had been between Icknield Port Road and Barford Rd, but the platform became too short when trains were lengthened.

The station closed in 1931, and there is little evidence of the station on the ground today. The trackbed through the station is now part of the Harborne Nature Walk.

Preceding station	Disused railways	Following station
Rotton Park Road	Harborne Railway; Harborne Branch Line	Monument Lane
