= Harborne railway station =

Former railway station in England

Harborne
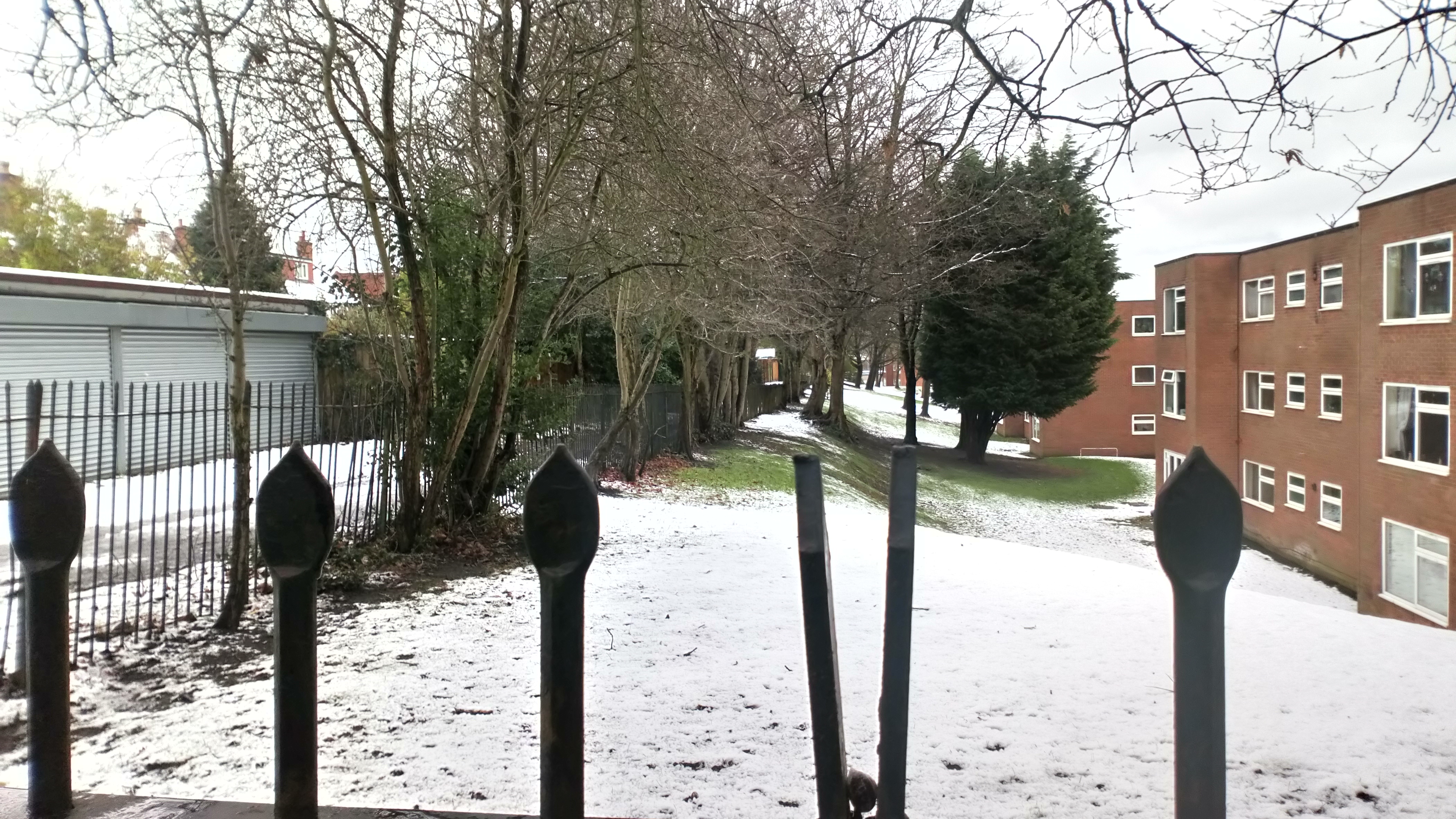
- The site of Harborne station.

General information
- Location: Harborne, Birmingham; England
- Coordinates: 52.4600°N 1.9519°W
- Grid reference: SP033846
- Platforms: 2

Other information
- Status: Disused

History
- Original company: Harborne Railway
- Pre-grouping: London and North Western Railway
- Post-grouping: London, Midland and Scottish Railway

Key dates
- 10 August 1874: Opened
- 26 November 1934: Closed to passengers
- 1963: Closed to goods traffic
Location

Harborne railway station was a railway station in Birmingham, England, built by the Harborne Railway and operated by the London and North Western Railway in 1874. In addition to the passenger facilities, there was a goods shed and sidings.

It was the terminus of the Harborne Railway, serving the Harborne area of Birmingham and was located just off Station Road. Although for twenty years the line was in the hands of the receiver, passenger traffic rose from six trains a day each way during the week, to twenty a day in 1897, and twenty-nine by 1910.

Originally a single line, the station included a runaround loop, with a turntable (removed in 1942) at the head. It originally had only one platform. The platform was extended in 1897 to cope with the additional traffic. In 1897 an additional siding was also put in to meet the demands for local freight traffic. The cattle pens were demolished and the coal offices removed to another part of the wharf. A second platform was added next to the loop in 1901, however, with the introduction of the Birmingham Corporation Tramways it was rarely used and was removed in 1911, with carriage sidings in its place. There was a footbridge from the station, built in 1908 to the newly developed Harborne Estates.

At the grouping in 1923 it became part of the London Midland and Scottish Railway.

The station closed to passenger traffic in 1934, though it was open to goods traffic until 1963. The last train was operated by the Stephenson Locomotive Society to commemorate the closure of the station on 4 November 1963.

There is no evidence of the station on the ground today, and the station site is in use by both industry and housing.

Preceding station	Disused railways	Following station
Terminus	Harborne Railway; Harborne Branch Line	Hagley Road

== See also ==
- Harborne Railway
