= Icknield Port Loop =

Historic English canal

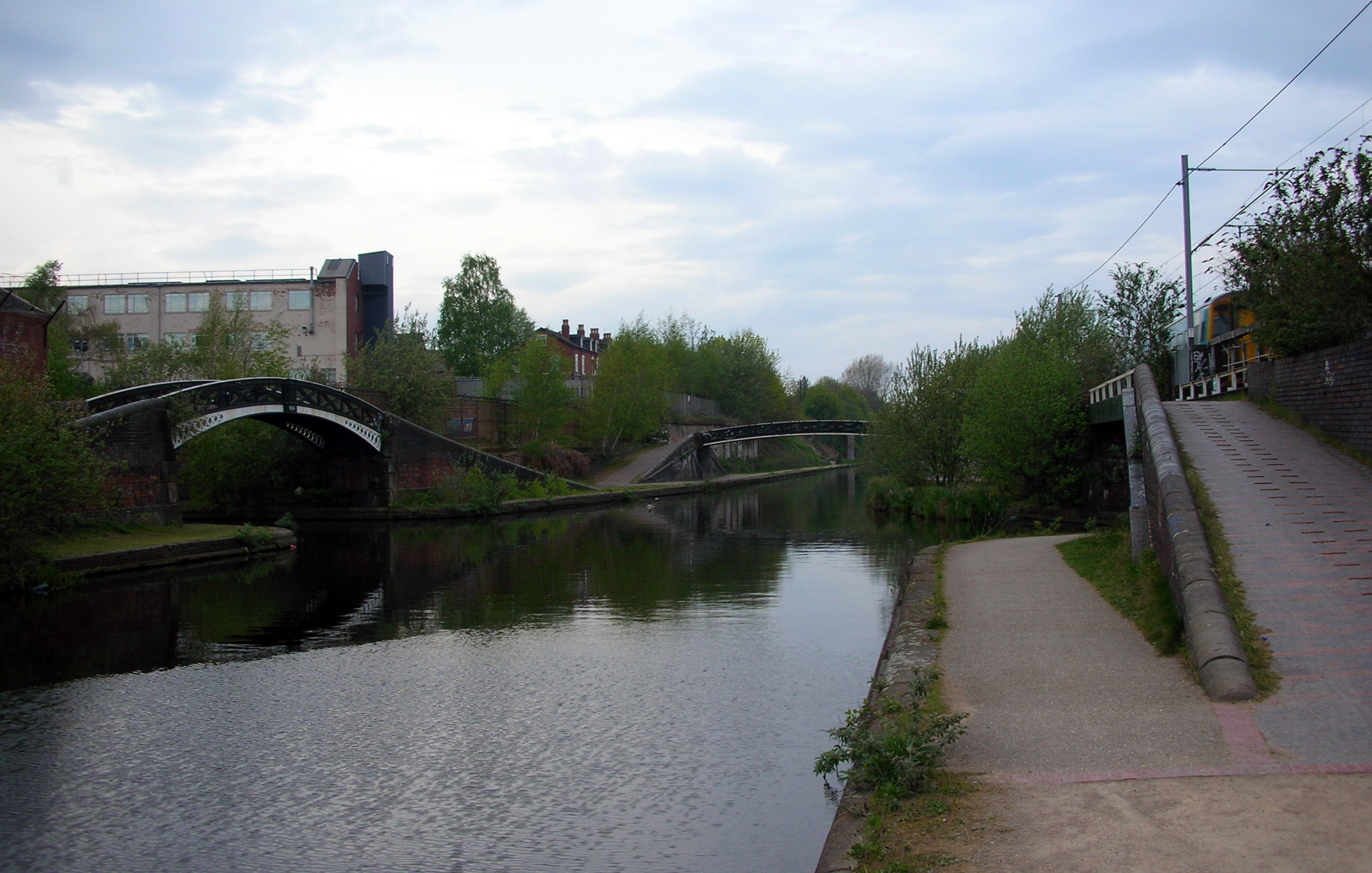
- Rotton Park Junction. The Icknield Port Loop runs through the bridge to the left.
- Interactive map of Icknield Port Loop

Specifications
- Maximum height above sea level: 453 ft (138 m) (Birmingham Level)
- Status: Open
- Navigation authority: Canal and River Trust

History
- Date completed: 1769

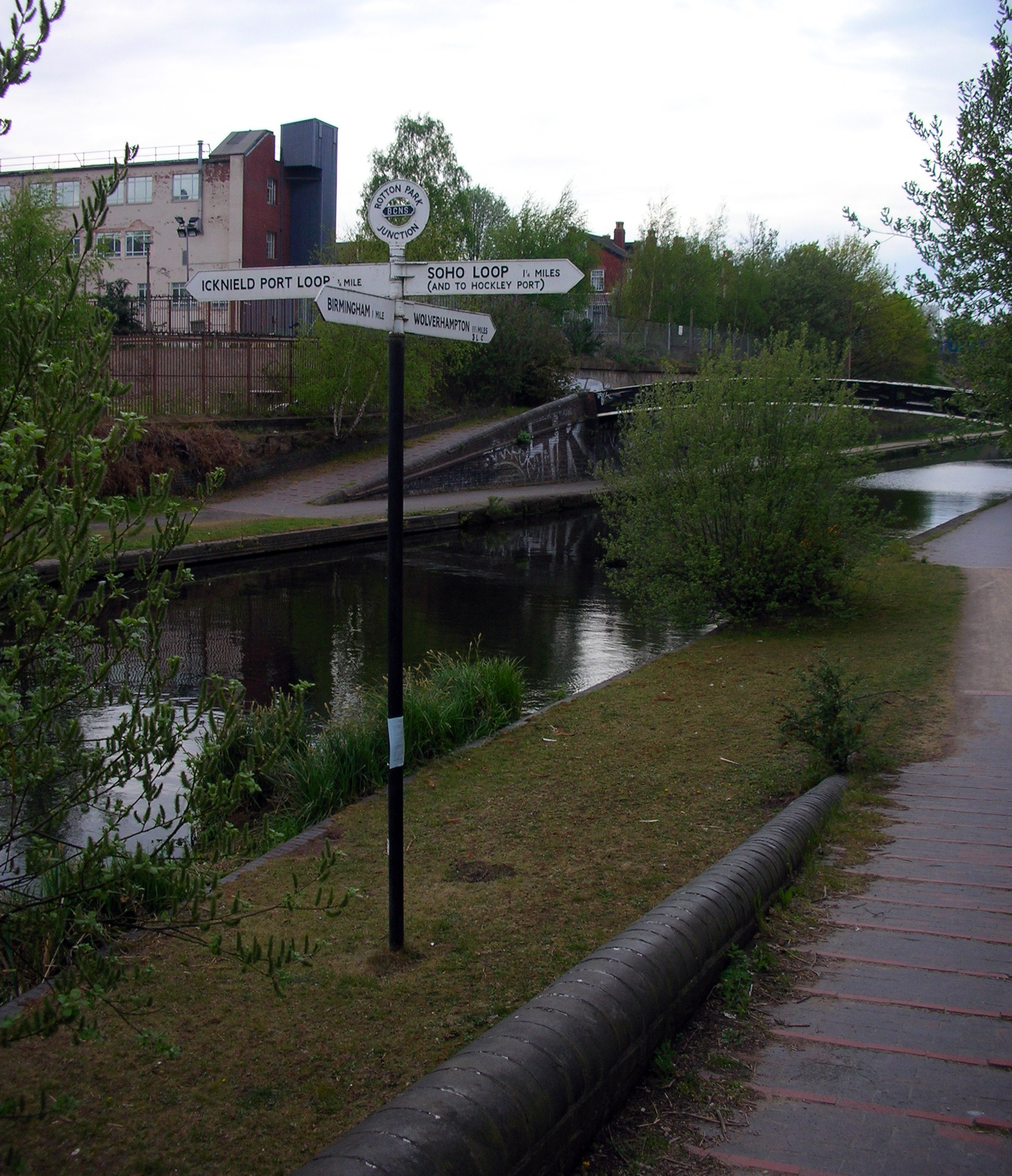
Fingerpost at Rotton Park Junction on the New Main Line crossroads showing the Old Main Line loops left and right)

The Icknield Port Loop (originally the Rotton Park Loop) is a 0.6-mile (1 km) loop of the eighteenth-century-built Old BCN Main Line canal in Birmingham, England, about 2 miles (3 km) west of the city centre, which opened to traffic on 6 November 1769 and in some definitions includes its straighter bypass built in September 1827, a 550-yard (500 m) section of the New BCN Main Line. Most of the 56 acres (23 ha) of land thereby enclosed is derelict meaning the canal serves the Canal & River Trust (British Waterways) maintenance depot at Icknield Port and conveys water from Edgbaston Reservoir to the BCN Main Line. The enclosed land has no pedestrian or vehicular access. Icknield Port (Loop) takes its name from the Roman Icknield Street which passed nearby, the exact route of which is unknown.

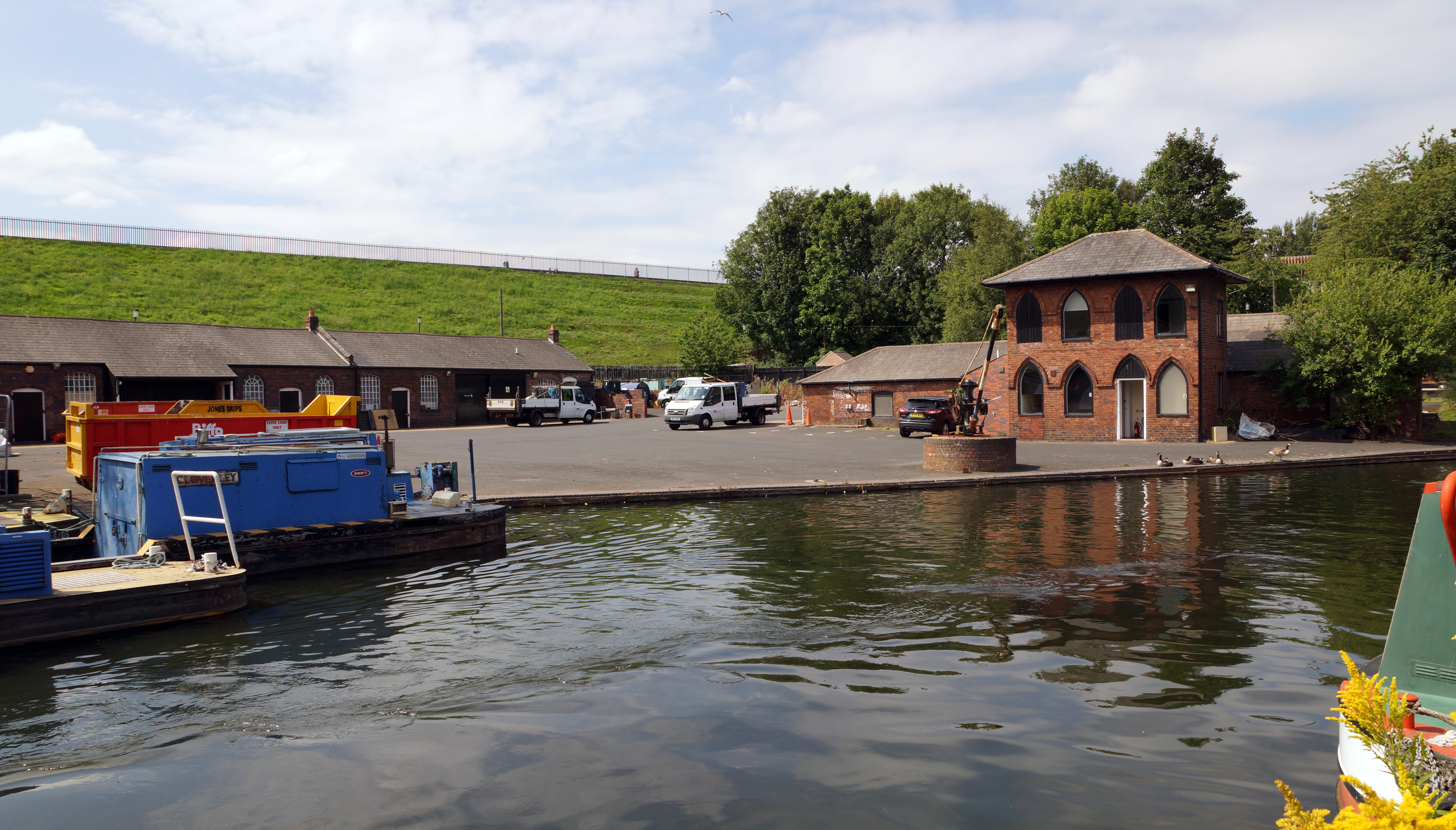
The canal maintenance depot below the reservoir dam

The Canal & River Trust (formerly British Waterways) depot with its buildings and crane are Grade II listed buildings.

== Redevelopment plan ==
Birmingham City Council has plans for the regeneration of the area, including moorings, 1,150 new homes, shops, park and playground, and a ten-story hotel.

In recent years, the loop has been developed by award-winning developer, Urban Splash. The first stage of a multi stage masterplan has been completed. Building works are ongoing for hundreds of further homes. The final stages will include shops and bars as part of the development.

There is a mixture of houses on the development, the majority of the development so far being 'row house' and a selection of limited edition brick houses.

The development has been awarded winners of Best regeneration initiative at Housebuilder Awards and Placemaking Project of the Year at Midlands Business Insider Residential Awards 2020.

Point	Coordinates (Links to map resources)	OS Grid Ref	Notes
Sandy Turn Junction	52.4827°N 1.9259°W	SP050872	BCN Old and New Lines meet
Icknield Port	52.4810°N 1.9330°W	SP046870	Canals and Rivers Trust maintenance depot
Feed in from Edgbaston (Rotton Park) Reservoir	52.48129°N 1.93308°W	SP045870	
Rotton Park Junction	52.4843°N 1.9291°W	SP048874	BCN Old and New Lines cross

== See also ==
- Soho Loop
