= Harborne Railway =

Former railway line in the West Midlands, England

The Harborne Railway was a short standard gauge railway line constructed for residential travel from the Harborne area into the centre of Birmingham, England. The line opened in 1874, and was worked by the London and North Western Railway. As business developed, an increasingly frequent passenger service was operated, at its peak thirty trains each way daily. From the 1920s onwards, it suffered from bus service competition and it was closed to passenger trains in 1934. A private siding connection had been made to Mitchells & Butlers Brewery, but the line was closed completely in 1963. The track bed has since been converted to the Harborne Walkway, a shared-use path.

== Conception ==
Harborne Railway Act 1866
- Act of Parliament
- Parliament of the United Kingdom
- Long title: An Act to incorporate the Harborne Railway Company, and to authorize the making and maintaining of a Railway, to be called "The Harborne Railway;" and for other Purposes.
- Citation: 29 & 30 Vict. c. ci

Dates
- Royal assent: 28 June 1866

In 1866, Harborne was a distinct community outside Birmingham, with a population of over 22,000. The Harborne Railway was planned to serve certain suburbs of Birmingham, bringing in business people from the well-to-do areas of Lapal (near Halesowen) and Harborne. However, there was major opposition to the Lapal end of the scheme, and the promoters cut back their scheme to a route of just under 2 1/2 miles. The Harborne Railway Company got its act of Parliament, the Harborne Railway Act 1866 (29 & 30 Vict. c. ci) on 28 June 1866. Authorised capital was £100,000.

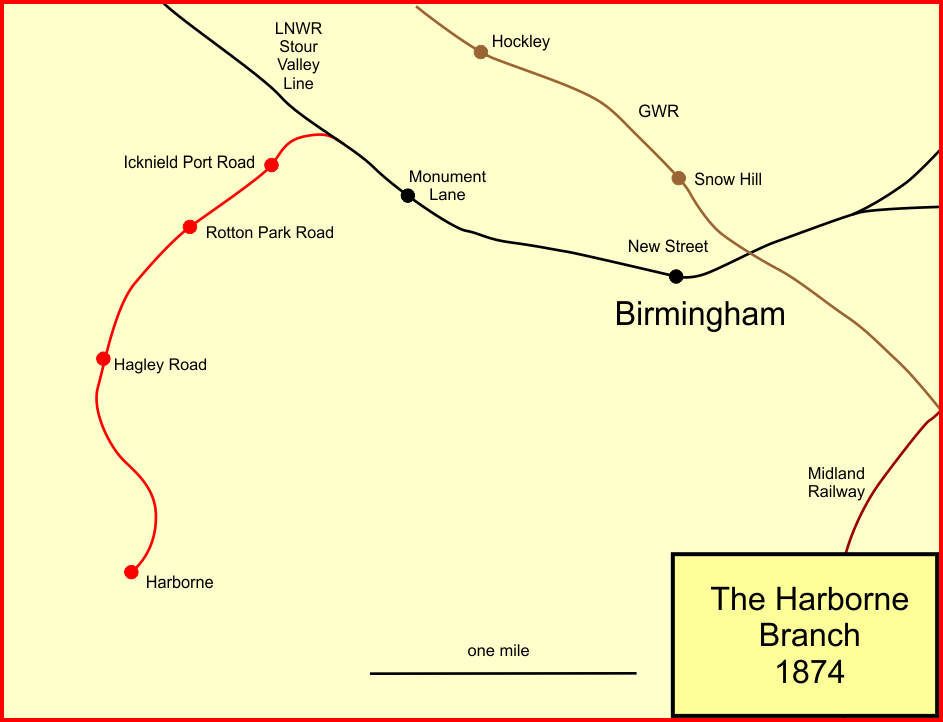
The Harborne Railway

The company concluded an arrangement with the London and North Western Railway to work the line for 50% of receipts. The line would join the LNWR Stour Valley Line at Monument Lane Junction, later renamed Harborne Junction. The branch was a single line.

The station at Harborne opened, and passenger traffic commenced on 10 August 1874. There was a Sunday service at first but there were complaints that the Sabbath was being disturbed and the Company withdrew the trains. Goods services started on 3 October 1874.

The first passenger train service was of six trains each way on weekdays and three on Sundays. The early departure of the last train into Birmingham was at 19:20, which attracted adverse comment at the time.

In 1879, Harborne station platform was extended, and the junction with the Stour Valley main line was renamed Harborne Junction. In 1893, the platform at Harborne was extended, in order to handle longer trains. There was a turntable and a run-round loop, but both were practically unused, and were later removed.

In 1897, Icknield Port Road station was moved west of the road in its name; the first station had been between the bridges for that road and Barford Road; when it was desired to lengthen the platform, it could not be extended in its old location.

In 1903, Rotton Park Road station was made into an island platform with a passing loop, enabling the train frequency to be improved. As part of the layout alterations, a siding spur into Mitchell and Butler's brewery was provided, and much traffic resulted.

== Financial performance ==
Early financial operating performance seemed good, but heavy interest on capital expenditure caught up with the company, and a receiver in bankruptcy was appointed on 26 July 1879. The receiver was discharged on 31 December 1900. During the whole of its separate existence dividends were never high, although between 1919 and 1922 a dividend of 3% was paid. The Harborne Railway Company was absorbed by the new London Midland and Scottish Railway at the Grouping of 1923 under the Railways Act 1921. The LNWR had worked the line throughout its existence.

== Services ==
The early passenger train frequency was gradually improved over the years, and in 1897 when there was still no passing loop on the branch, there were twenty trains daily in each direction. The service was an early example of a regular interval service, with an hourly departure in each direction. By April 1920 the service had further increased to 30 down and 31 up trains daily.

== Decline ==
In the 1920s and 1930s, bus competition impacted the line's usage by taking a shorter route into the city centre, and the LMS felt the necessity for economies. Icknield Port Road closed first in 1931. The Harborne branch closed to passengers on 26 November 1934.

Coal continued to be carried, but complete closure of the branch took place on 4 November 1963. After closure the track was removed and stations demolished.

== Harborne Walkway ==
The track bed has since been converted to a shared-use path; the Harborne Walkway. Several relics are extant.

The bridge that carried the railway over Park Hill Road has survived, and now forms the start of the walkway. Most of the bridges that carried roads over the line (e.g. Woodbourne Road, Hagley Road) have also survived. Discarded sleepers can be found alongside the walkway. Although none of the stations survive, the nameplate from Harborne signal box does and can be found in Harborne library.

After Harborne station closed, the site was cleared and redeveloped. Frensham Way was built on the site, and now there are no relics that suggest the site was once a railway station. The only hints to the site's previous use are "Station Road" and a housing development called "The Sidings", which was built recently on the site of the old turntable.

Unlike Harborne station, the site of Hagley Road station was not redeveloped. The station buildings were demolished, but some bricks from the station can be found in the undergrowth, and the site of the goods yard is still there, but it is overgrown. A row of cottages still face the line.

Rotton Park Road's buildings were cleared as early as 1934. When the island platform was demolished in that year, a mound was left. Although overgrown, it can still be seen today. A concrete support that used to support the wooden footbridge can be seen at the site of the station

Icknield Port Road station closed in 1931, before the other stations on the line, and there are now no clues to a station's existence. The cutting where the station was located was filled in circa 2008. Until then, it was possible to walk under Icknield Port Road through the old bridge. It was also possible to see the retaining wall that bordered the path from the road to the platform. The line from here to the junction with the Stour Valley line used to run in a cutting, which has been filled in. The girder bridge that carried the line over the Stour Valley canal was removed, but the brick supports survive.

== Location list ==
- Harborne; opened 10 August 1874; closed 26 November 1934;
- Hagley Road; opened 10 August 1874; closed 26 November 1934;
- Rotton Park Road; opened 10 August 1874; closed 26 November 1934;
- Icknield Port Road; opened 10 August 1874; relocated 1897; closed 18 May 1931;
- Monument Lane Junction, later named Harborne Junction.

== Features ==
Point	Coordinates (Links to map resources)	OS Grid Ref	Notes
Junction with main line	52.48476°N 1.92962°W	SP04878742	Harborne Junction Stour Valley Line
Canal bridge	52.48546°N 1.93133°W	SP04768750	BCN Main Line
Icknield Port Road station	52.48489°N 1.93560°W	SP04478744	
Rotton Park Road station	52.48045°N 1.94522°W	SP03818694	
Hagley Road station	52.4730°N 1.9533°W	SP03268611	
Harborne station	52.46005°N 1.95095°W	SP03428467	

== Gallery ==
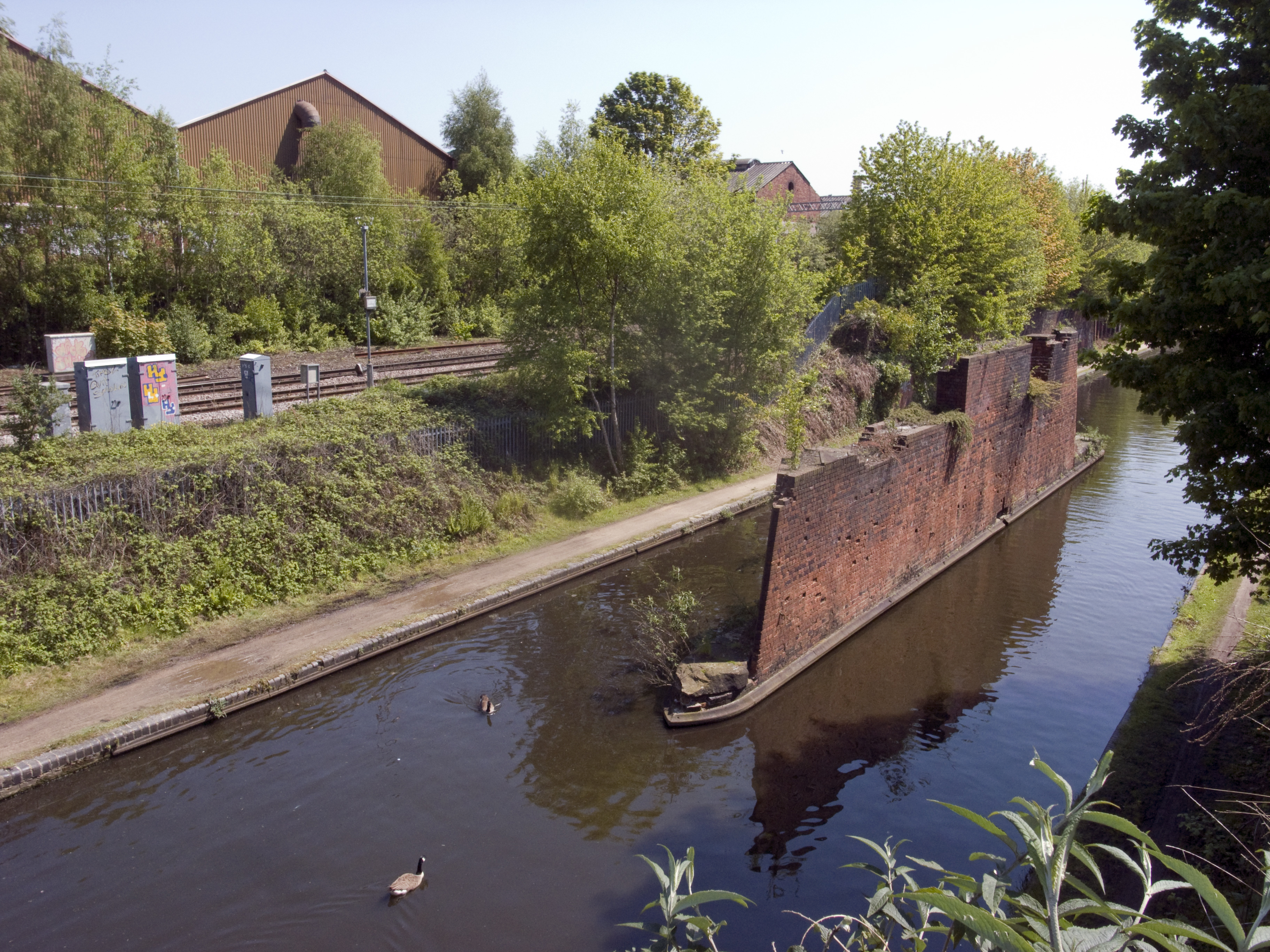
Bridge pier standing in the BCN Main Line canal. Harborne Junction was just to the right on the Stour Valley Line, which runs parallel to the canal.

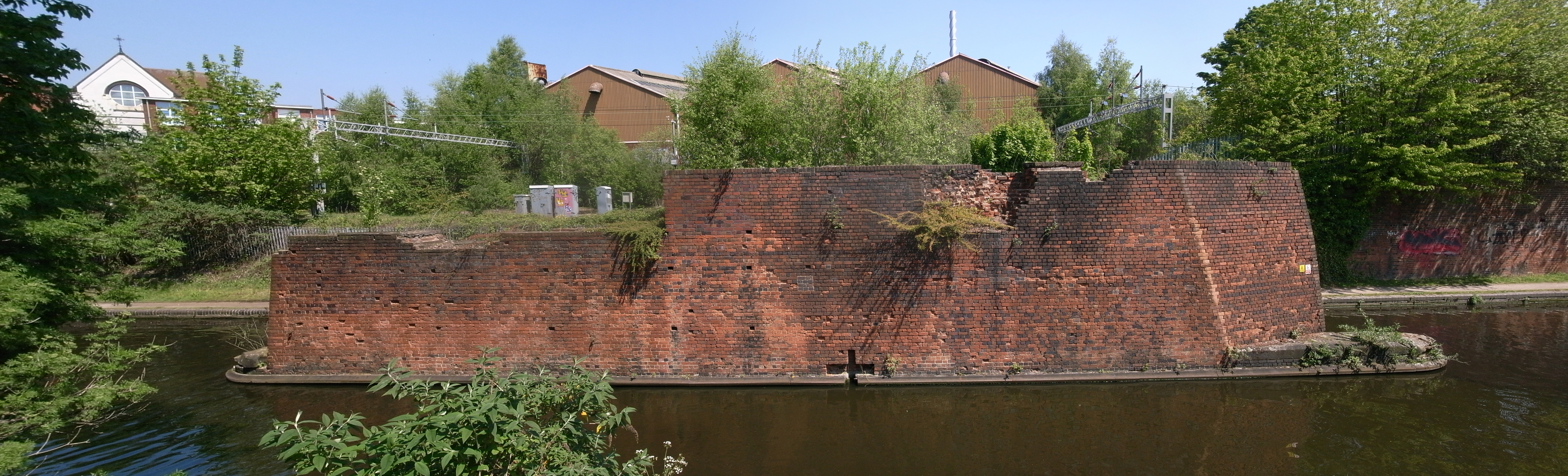
Composite picture of the bridge pier in the canal

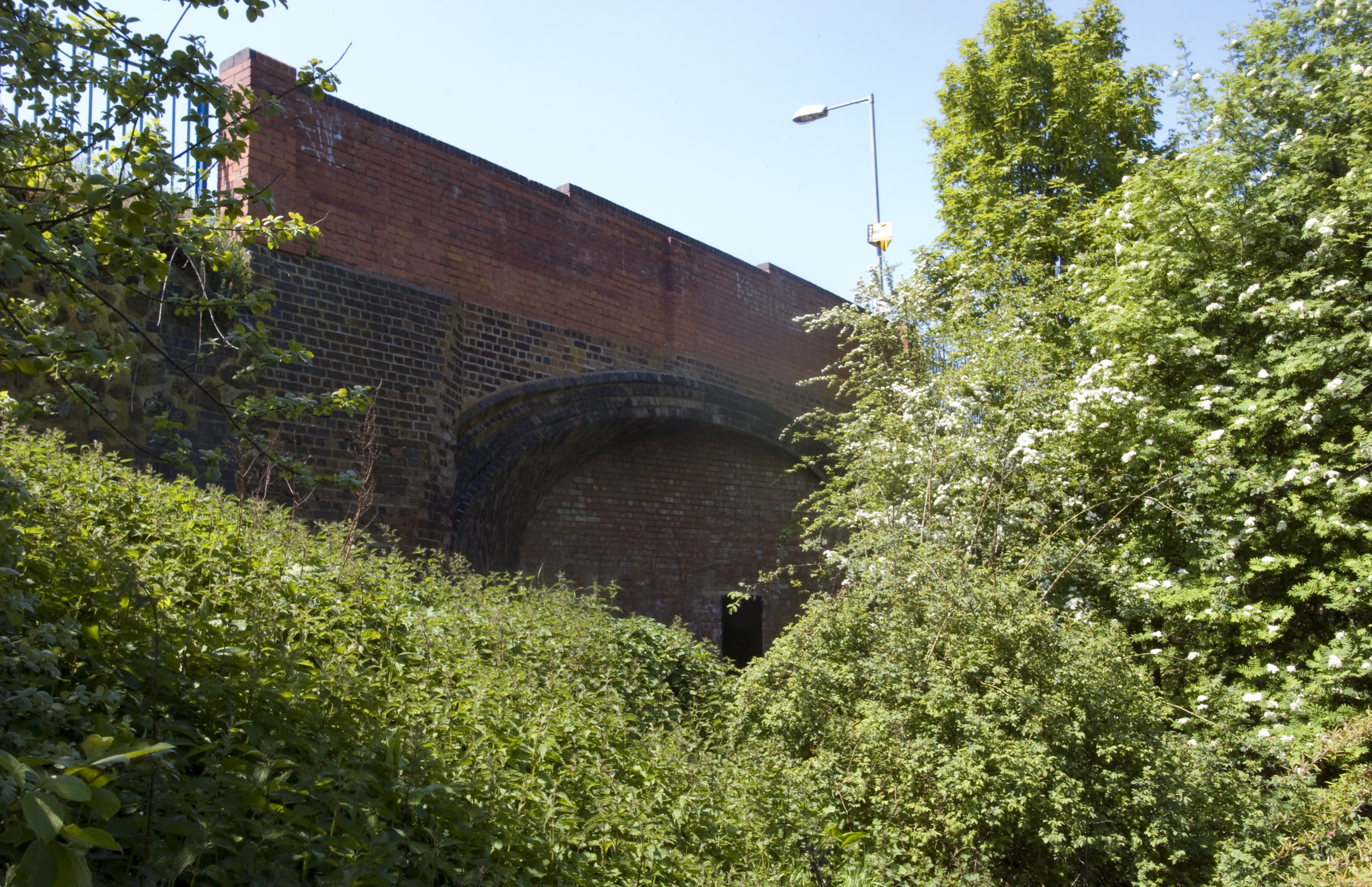
Northbrook Street bridge over the line at the western abudment of the canal bridge

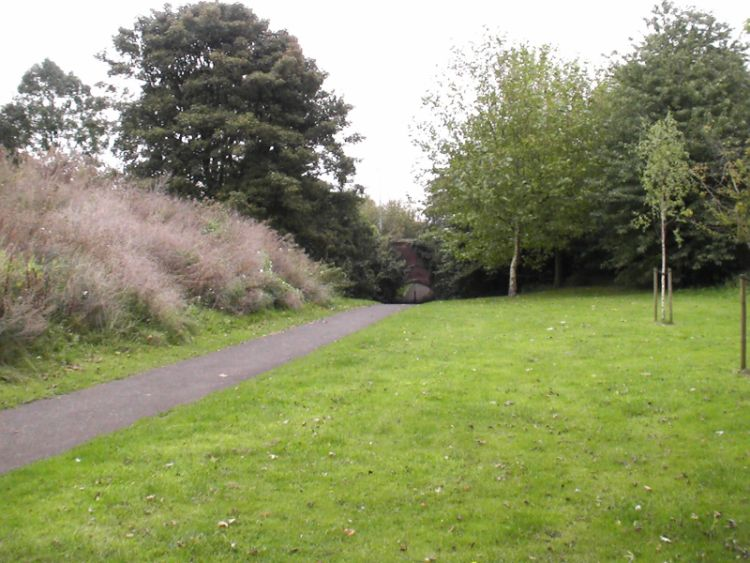
Site of Icknield Port Road Station in Summerfield Park.

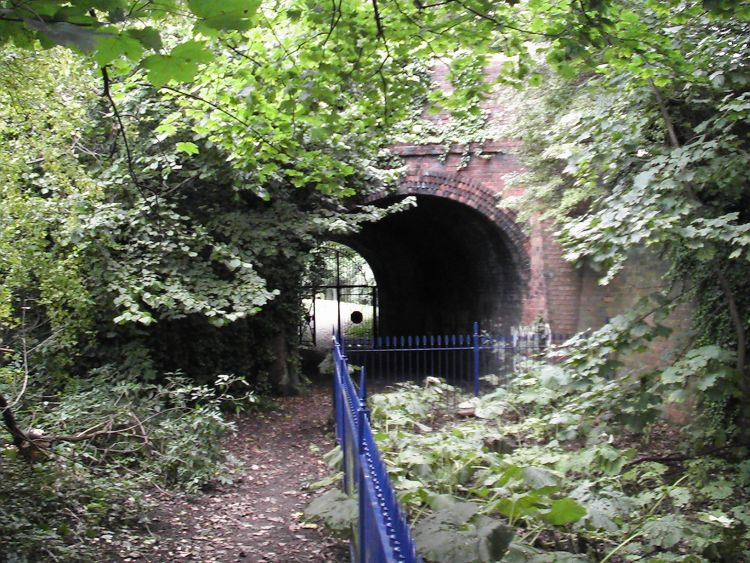
Bridge carrying Selwyn Road.

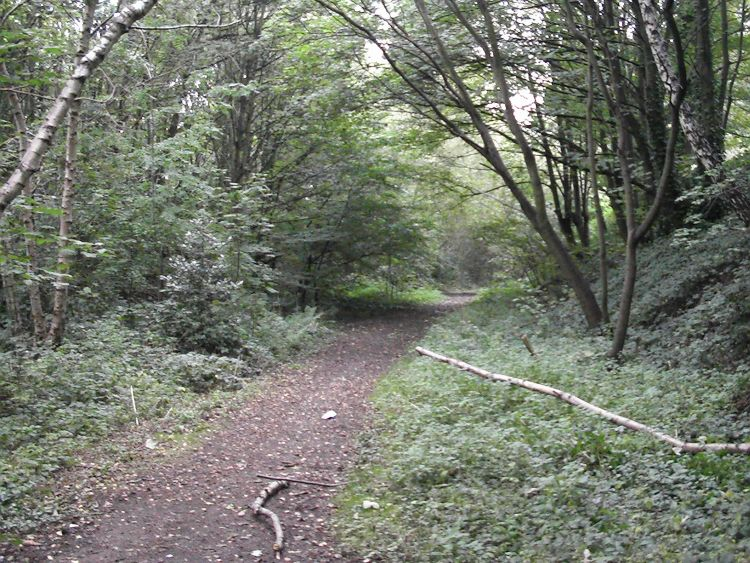
Nature's claim on the trackbed.

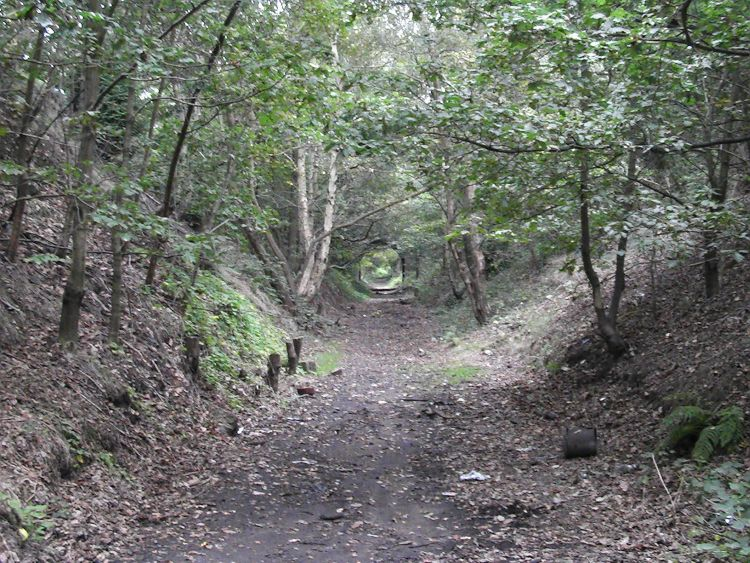
Bridge carrying Portland Road.

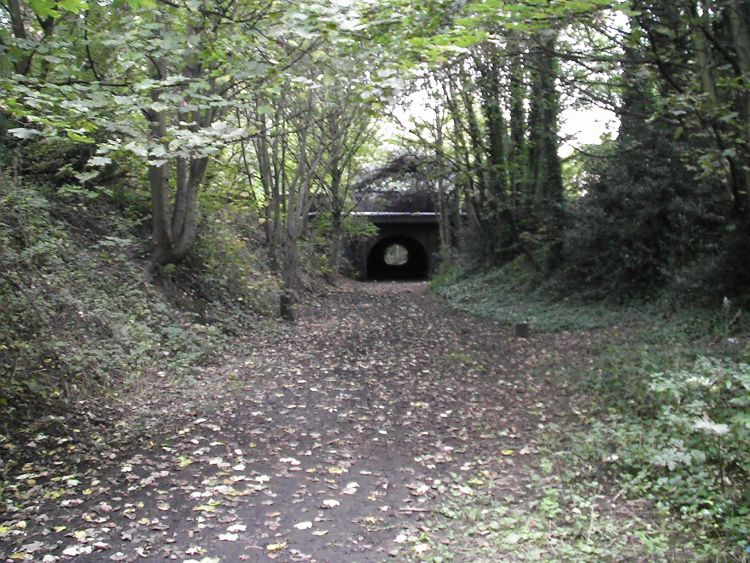
Site of Hagley Road Station.

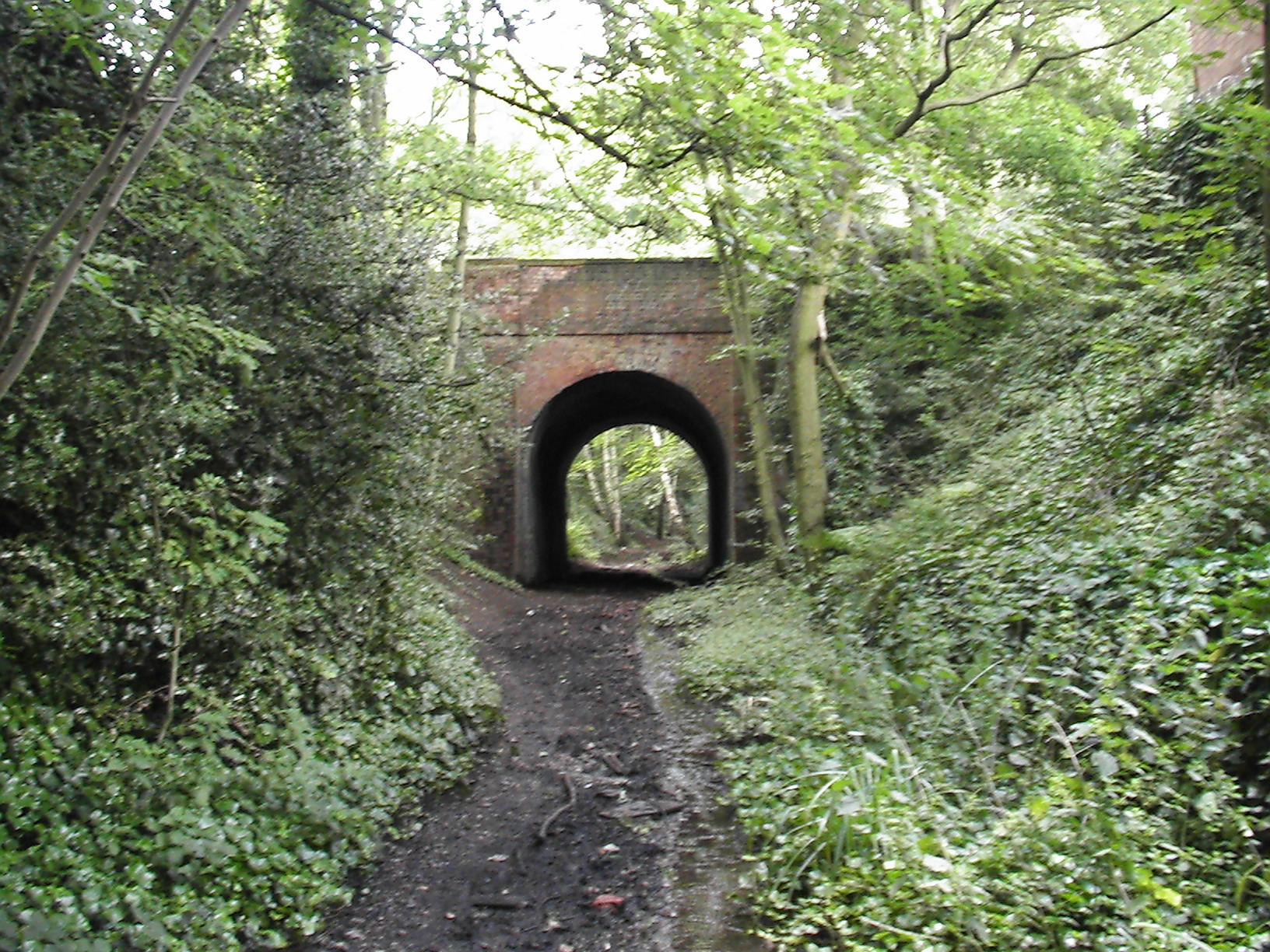
Bridge carrying Woodbourne Road.

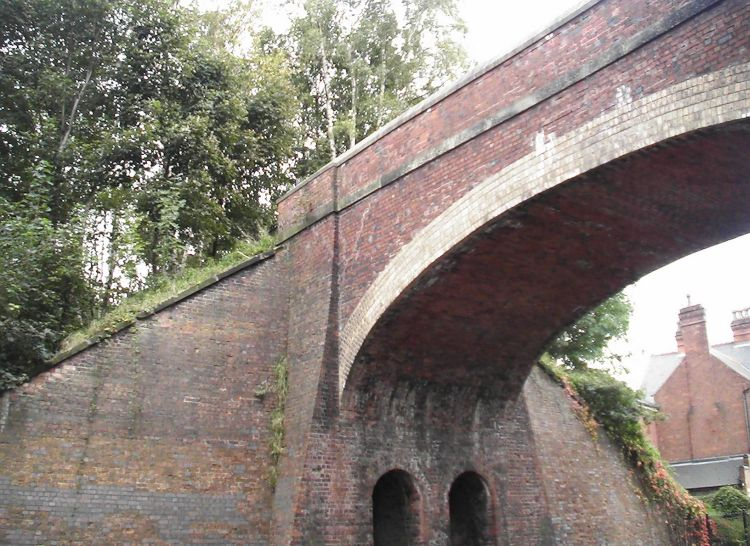
The Viaduct over Park Hill Road
