= Sugarloaf Cable Car =

Cableway system in Rio de Janeiro, Brazil

- Bondinho do Pão de Açúcar
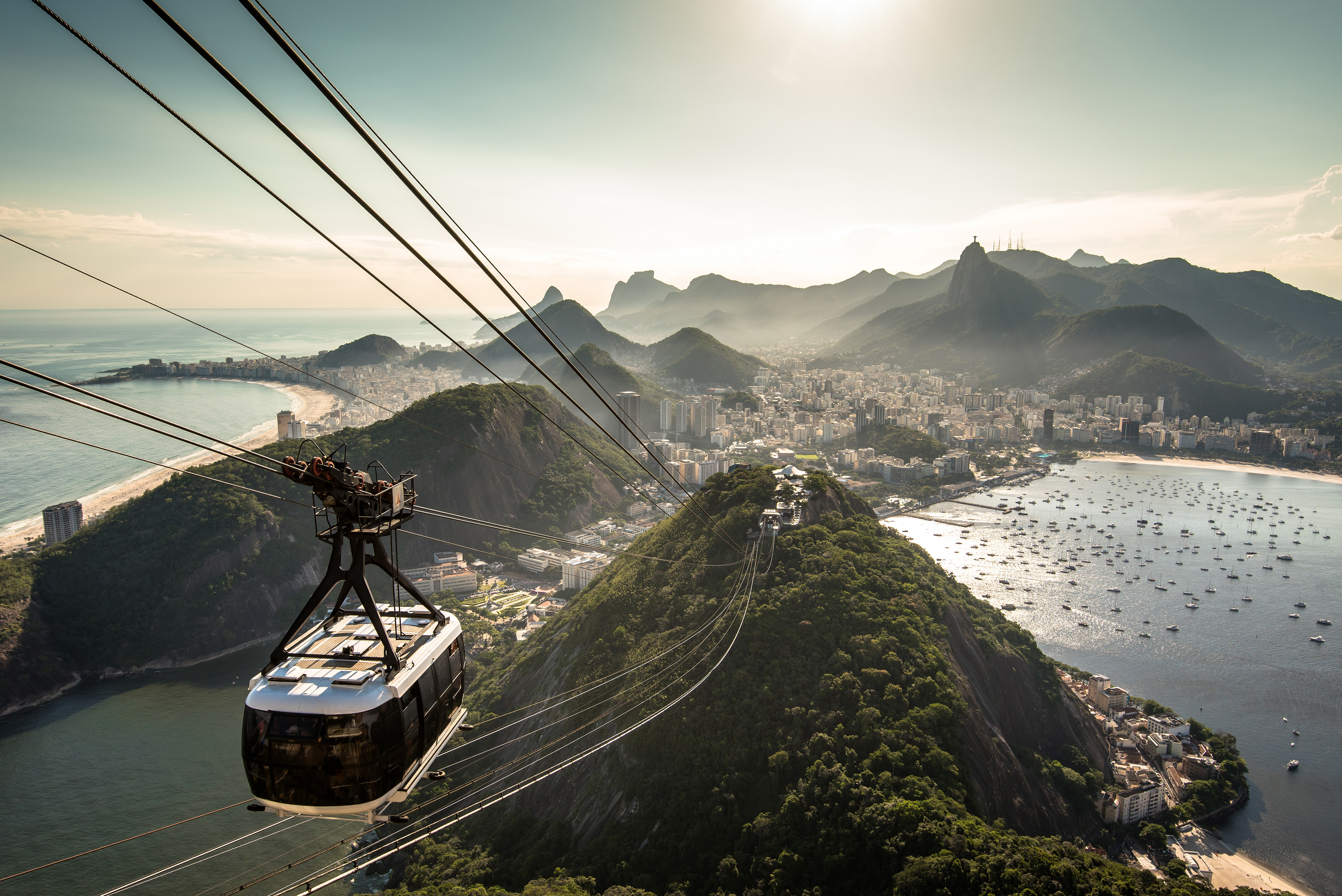
- Sugarloaf Cable Car

- Location within Rio de Janeiro

Overview
- Status: Operational
- Character: Recreational
- Location: Rio de Janeiro
- Country: Brazil
- Coordinates: 22°57′20″S 43°10′1″W
- Termini: Inicial; Pão de Açúcar
- Elevation: lowest: 0 m (0 ft) highest: 396 m (1,299 ft)
- No. of stations: 4
- Built by: Augusto Ferreira Ramos
- Construction begin: 1908
- Open: 27 October 1912; 113 years ago
- Last extension: 18 January 1913; 113 years ago
- Website: www.bondinho.com.br

Operation
- Operator: Companhia Caminho Aéreo Pão de Açúcar
- Carrier capacity: 65 passengers
- Ridership: 2,500 per day
- Operating times: 8:30 a.m.–8 p.m.
- Trips daily: 24
- Headway: 30 minutes
- Trip duration: 3 minutes
- Fare: R$ 160 (US$ 31)

Technical features
- Aerial lift type: Aerial tramway
- Manufactured by: CWA, Switzerland
- Line length: 600 m (2,000 ft) (Inicial-Urca); 850 m (2,790 ft) (Urca-Sugarloaf)
- Operating speed: 6 m/s (20 ft/s) (Inicial-Urca); 10 m/s (33 ft/s) (Urca-Sugarloaf)

The Sugarloaf Cable Car (Portuguese: Bondinho do Pão de Açúcar) is a cableway system in Rio de Janeiro, Brazil. The first part runs between Praia Vermelha and Morro da Urca (at 220 metres or 722 feet), from where the second rises to the summit of the 396-metre (1,299 ft) Sugarloaf Mountain.

The cableway was envisioned by the engineer Augusto Ferreira Ramos in 1908 who sought support from well-known figures of Rio's high society to promote its construction. Opened in 1912, it was only the third cableway to be built in the world. In 1972 the cars were updated, growing from a capacity of 22 to 75, and in 1979 it featured in an action scene for the James Bond film Moonraker. Today, it is used by approximately 2,500 visitors every day. The cable cars run every 30 minutes, between 8 a.m. and 10 p.m.

== History ==
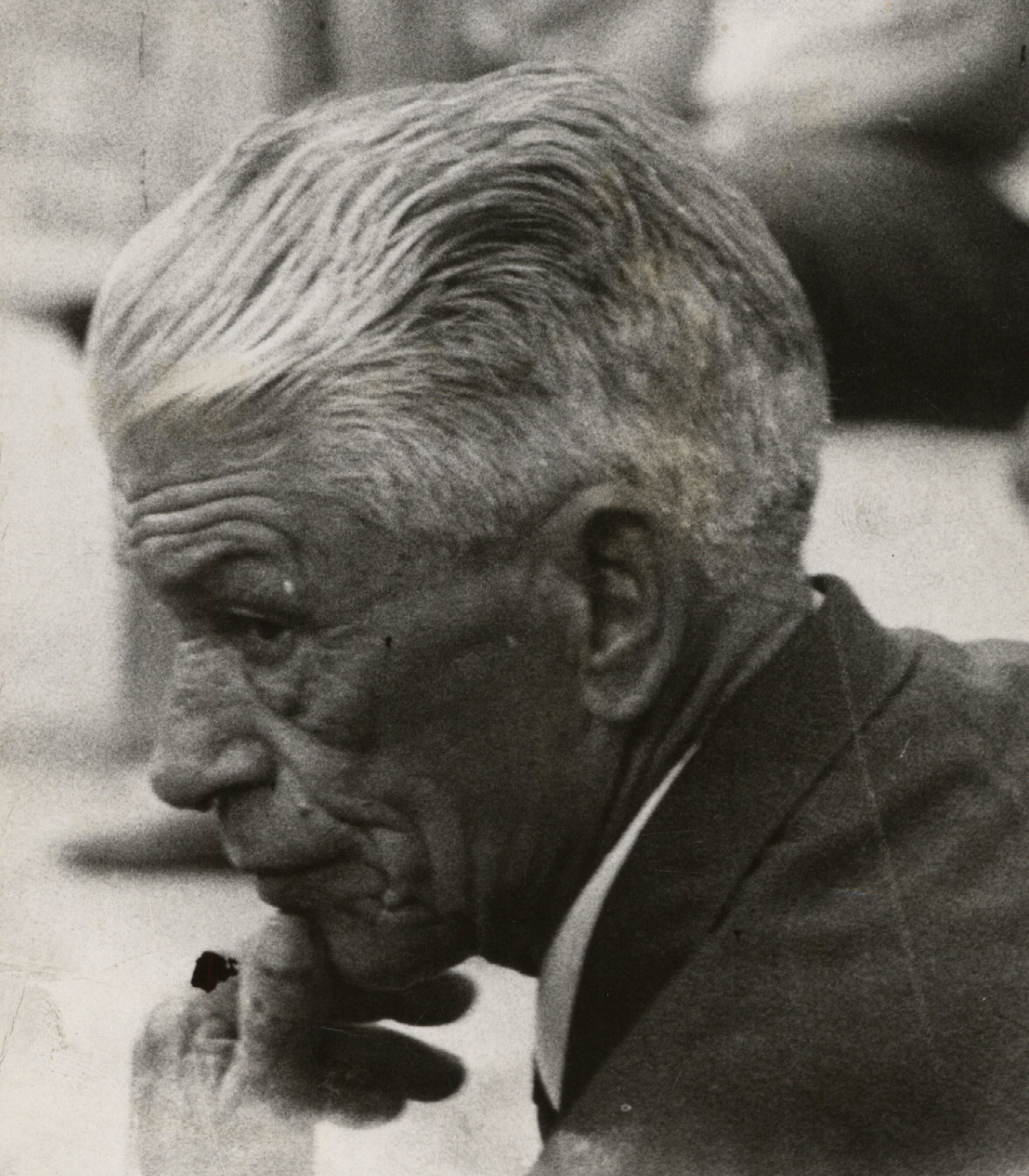
Augusto Ferreira Ramos

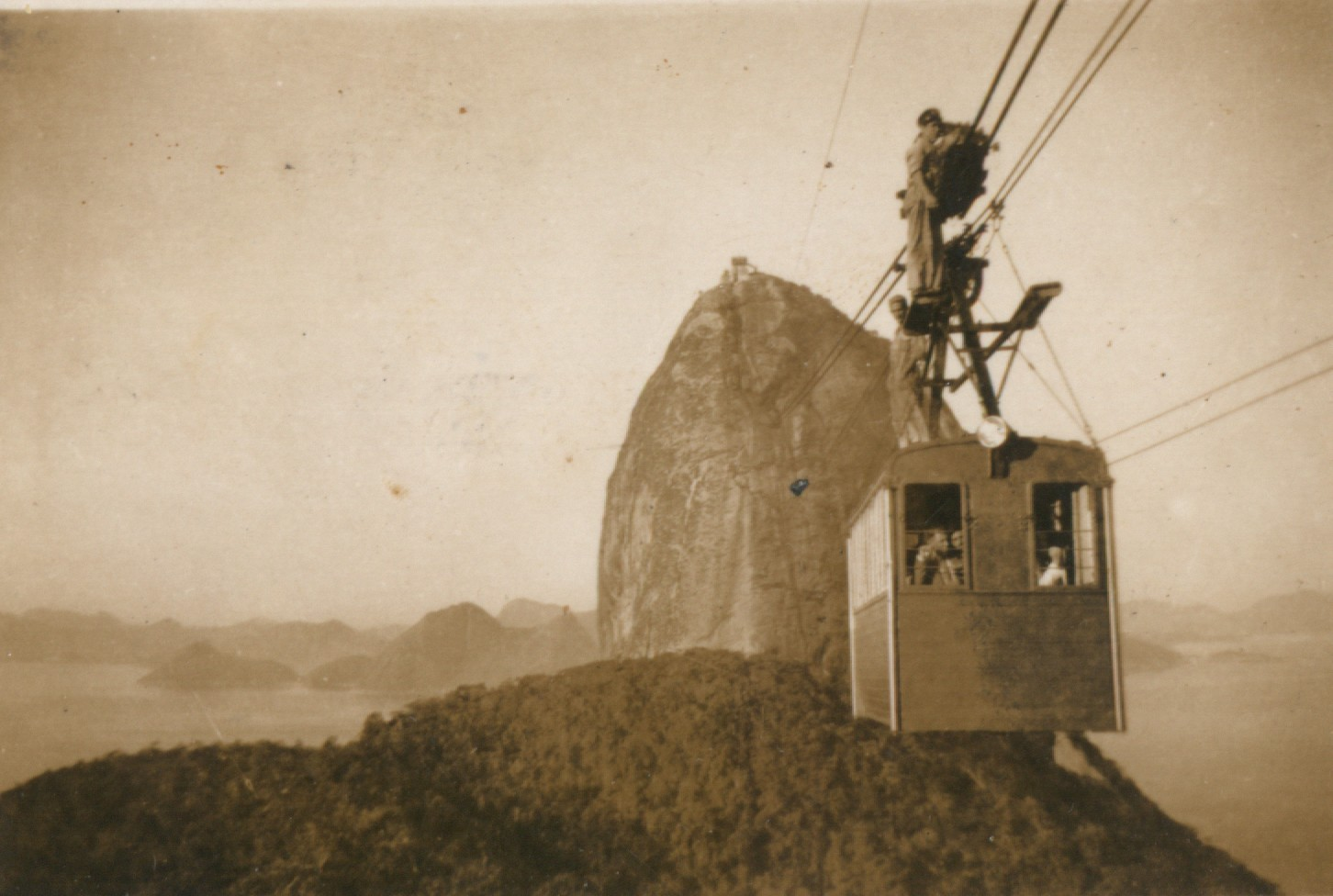
The original wooden cablecar (1940)

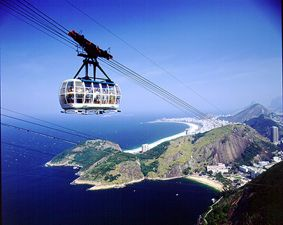
The modern cablecar (2006)

The development of technical and engineering achievement of the National Exhibition in Commemoration of the First Centenary of the Opening of the Ports of Brazil to the International Trade in 1908 motivated engineer Augusto Ramos to imagine a cable car system in Rio de Janeiro. Ramos had to resort to well-known personages of Rio's high society. These included Eduardo Guinles and Raymundo Ottoni de Castro Maya, who were powerful figures with a range of developmental interests in the city, to promote the idea of an electric cable system. When the cable car was built, there were only two others in the world: the chairlift at Mount Ulia, in Spain, with a length of 280 metres (920 ft), built in 1907, and the Wetterhorn Elevator, in Switzerland, with a length of 560 metres (1,840 ft), built in 1908.

The Sugarloaf Cable Car was opened on 27 October 1912. Its Portuguese-language name comes from the similarities between the cablecars, and the city trams (bondinhos). Envisioned by Augusto Ramos, it is managed by Companhia Caminho Aéreo Pão de Açúcar, a company created by Ramos.

The first cable cars were coated wood and were used for 60 years. Originally, the cable car stopped at Urca. In 1951, an accident occurred in which one of the two cables snapped, leaving 22 people dangling on one cable. One mechanic aboard, Augusto Goncales, climbed out and slithered down to Urca station and helped to build an emergency car to go back up and rescue the other passengers, 12 women and girls, 6 men and 3 children, in an event which took about 10 hours. President Vargas praised Goncales as the "Hero of the Day". In October 1972, a second cable was added, as well as new cabins, which expanded its capacity from 22 to 75; eventually, it was reduced to 65 to increase comfort.

The cable car was the setting for the 1979 James Bond film Moonraker in which British secret agent James Bond (played by actor Roger Moore) battles with his nemesis Jaws (Richard Kiel) in the middle of the tramway, which eventually results in a tramcar with Jaws in it crashing into the ground station and smashing through the wall, although he miraculously survives. During the filming, the stuntman Richard Graydon slipped and narrowly avoided falling to his death. For the scene in which Jaws bites into the steel tramway cable with his teeth, the cable was actually made of liquorice, although Richard Kiel was still required to use his steel dentures. Also in 1979, Las Vegas-based Steven McPeak walked the tightrope on the steel cable, the highest stretch of the cable car route, a feat which entered him into the Guinness Book of World Records. In 2007, Falko Traber walked along the rope of the cable railway. On the centenary of the cableway in 2012, Google honored it with a doodle, viewable in Brazil.

This cable car also appears in a few video games as well. For instance, it appears off in the distance in the Wii version of Need for Speed: Nitro, in one part of the Santa Teresa racing course in Rio de Jainero.

== Function ==
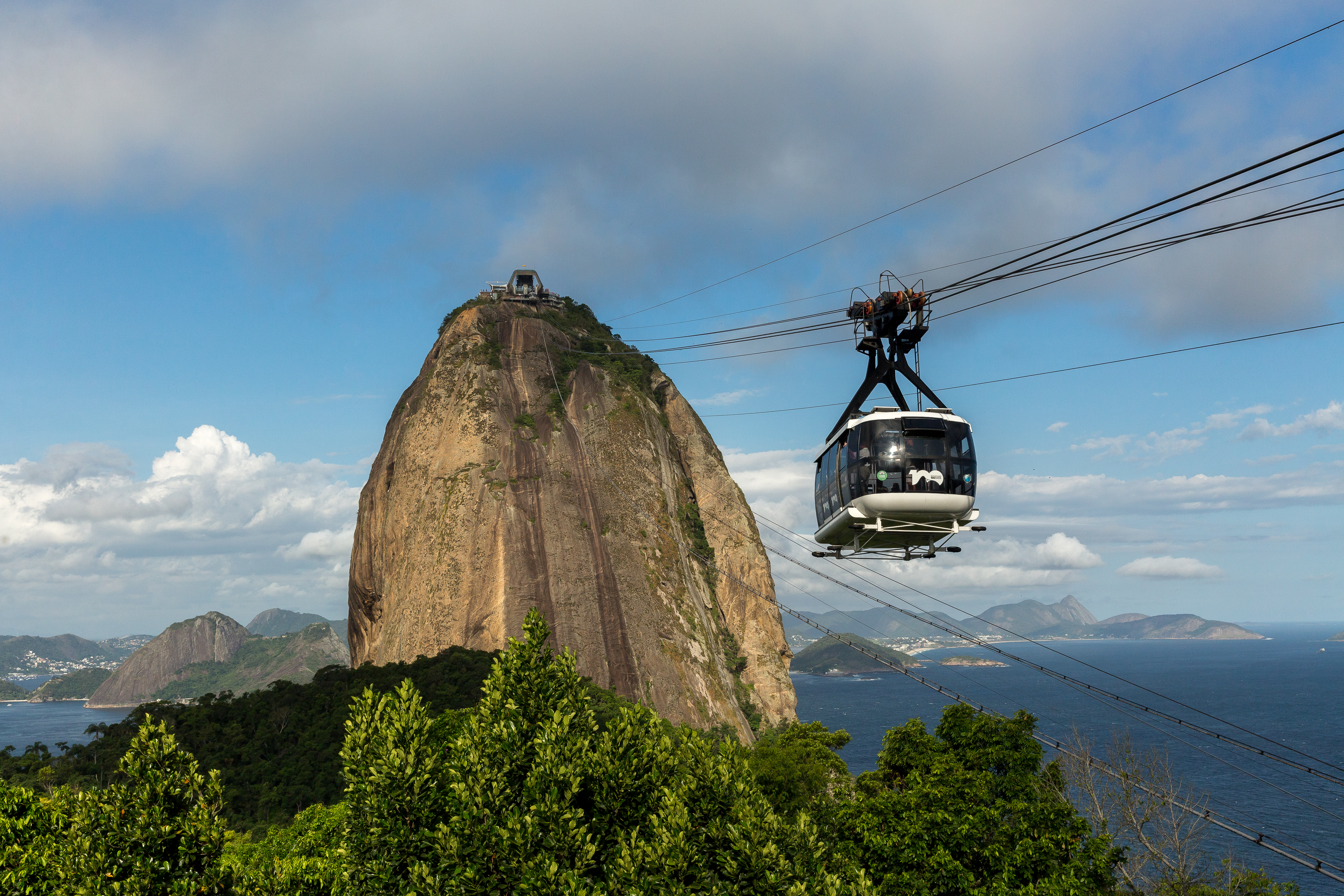
Approaching the summit

The cable cars run every 30 minutes, between 8 a.m. and 10 p.m. They are glassed in for safety and have a capacity of about 65 people.

The first part of the line, from the starting station to the stop off station at Morro da Urca, has a length of 600 metres (2,000 ft), with the maximum speed of 6 m/s (13 mph; 22 km/h). Morro da Urca is situated at an altitude of 220 metres (722 ft). It contains a cafe, snack bar, restaurant, souvenir stands, and a children's play area. The second part of the line, Morro da Urca to Sugarloaf, has a length of 850 metres (2,790 ft), with a maximum speed of 10 m/s (22 mph; 36 km/h). The latter part of the trip up to 396 metres (1,299 ft) on Sugarloaf, particularly towards the top, is very steep.
