= Maria Spelterini =

Italian tightrope walker (1853–1912)

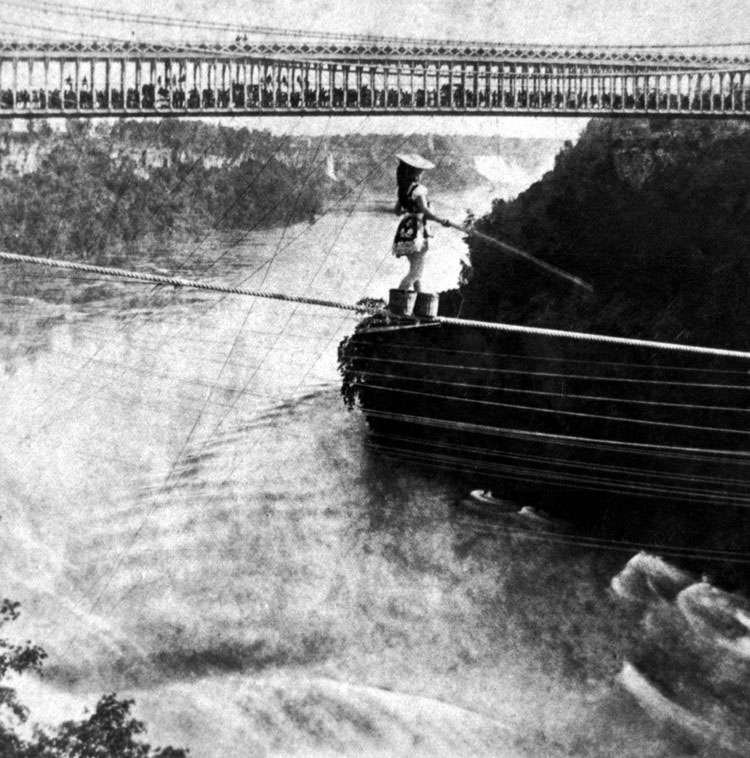
- Born: Maria Spelterini; 7 July 1853
- Died: 19 October 1912
- Occupation: Tightrope walker
- Spouse: José Espósito (m. 1875)

Maria Spelterini (stage names Spelterina and La Signorina, 7 July 1853 – 19 October 1912) was an Italian tightrope walker and acrobat who achieved international fame in the late 19th and early 20th century. Known for being the first woman crossing the Niagara Gorge on a tightrope over the Niagara Falls, she toured Europe, the United States and beyond.

== Early life ==
Maria Spelterini was born in 1853 in Livorno, Tuscany in central Italy. Her family were circus performers, and Spelterini took part in the family's performances from a young age, both domestic and internationally in Berlin and Vienna.

Spelterini later specialized in tightrope walking and performed at various locations across Europe. During the 1870s and 1880s, she toured Europe, North America, and South America. During her performances, she was always dressed in a flamboyant, colorful costume and often wore a hat tilted at a diagonal angle.

== Early performances in Europe ==
During her 1871 tour of Russia, Spelterini crossed both the Moskva River in Moscow and the Narva River in Saint Petersburg on a tightrope. In August 1872 she crossed the harbor at Saint Aubin, parish Saint Brelade on Jersey. An article appeared in the French newspaper L'Univers illustré on 4 October and an image showing her crossing the harbour.

On June 9, 1873 Spelterini performed at Surrey Gardens in Newington, London. In August of the same year, she performed at Pré-Catelan in the Bois de Boulogne, Paris, with shows on August 10, 18, and 24th.

In 1874, Spelterini toured Spain, performing at venues such as the Teatro del Circo in Barcelona, the Jardines del Buen Retiro and Circo Price in Madrid, and in Córdoba. In 1875, she traveled to Portugal, performing in Porto and Lisbon. She subsequently returned to Spain, giving several performances at "El Torín" in Barcelona and at the "Circo Táurico" in Valencia.

In August 1875, Spelterini married the Spanish circus entrepreneur José Espósito.

== Performances in the USA ==
In 1876, Spelterini arrived in the USA for the United States Centennial celebrations. She gave several performances there at Jones's Wood Colisseum in Manhattan, New York. After being denied permission to tightrope walk between the towers of the Brooklyn Bridge, she traveled to the Niagara Gorge and Niagara Falls on the Canada–U.S. border in July to perform.

Spelterini completed a total of five tightrope walks across Niagara Falls, starting just north of the Niagara Falls Suspension Bridge.

- First walk: July 8, on a 300-meter-long (984 ft), 5.7 centimeter-thick (2 1/4 in) rope from the American to the Canadian side, in about 11 minutes
- Second walk: July 12, with peach baskets strapped to her feet
- Third walk: July 19, blind folded with a paper bag over her eyes
- Fourth walk: July 22, shackled at the wrists and ankles
- Fifth walk: July 26, the farewell performance

After her performances at Niagara Falls, Spelterini returned to Philadelphia for further engagements.

== Later performances ==
In 1877 Spelterini arrived in Rosario, in the Argentine province of Santa Fe, as part of an extended tour. On the day of her premiere, May 5, she attempted to cross the "Teatro Olimpo" on a tightrope while riding a bicycle. However, the bicycle broke down and she fell to the ground, though she escaped with only moderate injuries. After recovering from the accident, she proceeded to Buenos Aires on May 19 for a performance at the Plaza de la Victoria on July 9.

In January 1879, Spelterini performed once again at the "Circo" in Lisbon.

In July 1882, Spelterini returned to Spain to perform at the "Plaza de Toros" in Barcelona, as well as at the "Jardines del Buen Retiro" and "Circo Price" in Madrid. In one of her daring balancing acts, she ate a meal while on the tightrope, with a table suspended around her neck and seated on a chair attached to her back. During 1883 Spelterini performed in France again, appearing at venues such as "L'Hippodrome" in Paris and in Nîmes.

== Later years and cultural legacy ==
Later she returned to Europe and little is known of her later life. Spelterini eventually retired from life as a circus performer. She passed away on October 19 1912.

In 2016, Spelterini was honored by the Italian rock noir-band Belladonna on their album The Orchestral Album.
