= Erika Lemay =

Canadian artist, aerial dancer and actress (born 1983)

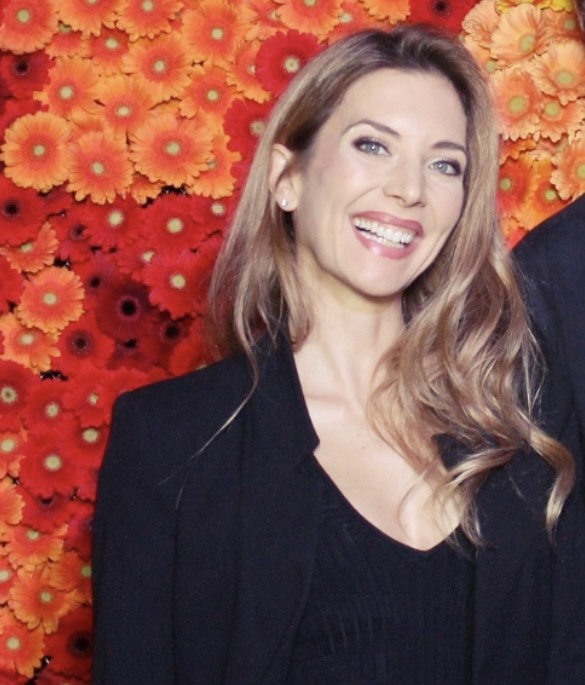
- Lemay in 2021
- Born: 23 March 1983 (age 43); Quebec, Canada
- Known for: theatrical interpretation, dance, aerial acrobatics and contortion
- Website: erikalemay.com

Erika Lemay (born 23 March 1983, Quebec, Canada) is a Canadian artist, aerial dancer, actress, and author. She is a show director specialized in luxury events, and creator of Physical Poetry.

== Biography ==
Lemay began ballet when she was four years old. She was a gymnast until the age of 11, when she became the youngest member of Cirque Eos, a Canadian circus company. At the age of 14, she performed for the first time in Europe in "La Piste aux Espoirs", Belgium's International Circus Festival, winning the gold medal and the Public's Choice Award. This boosted her international career, touring Canada, US, Europe, Middle and South America with international circuses. In 2003, Lemay became a freelance artist, presenting at various international events.

Lemay is also an inspirational speaker and Arts Ambassador for the nonprofit organization "Thinking ahead".

In 2020, Lemay staged Aerial models for Valentino. In 2021, she published a book titled Almost Perfect: The Life Guide to Creating Your Success Story Through Passion and Fearlessness.

In March 2022, Lemay made an appearance in the spin-off America’s Got Talent: Extreme, winning Unanimous Golden Buzzer for her act and becoming a Grand-Finalist.

=== LEMAlab ===
Lemay is the founder of health and wellness company LEMAlab. The company features a supplement line for physical artists and joint health. After having suffered a serious shoulder injury, doctors told Lemay it was the end of her career. She made a full recovery and returned to perform. That inspired her to start the company.

=== Physical Poetry ===
Physical Poetry is an art form created and performed by Lemay in theaters. The art form is a physical language created from the fusion between acrobatics, aerial arts, dance, and theater.

=== Performances ===
Performances by Lemay include:

- Inauguration of new Milano Malpensa Airport – MilanoExpo2015
- Venice Film Festival 66th at Quintessentially VIP Terrace with Douglas Kirkland
- Venice Film Festival 70th at Spazio Cinecittà Luce, Soundtrack Stars Awards opening ceremony
- Royal Albert Hall in London, Varekai Red carpet by Cirque du Soleil
- Marlborough House in London at Ark Fundraising, with Prince.
- Opening ceremony of the International Autodrome Ferrari in Imola, Italy
- FIBA 2010 Basket World Championship Opening by Cirque du Soleil at Arena Istanbul.
- 10th Monte Carlo Film Festival ceremony awards.
- TV movie The Half Brother, NRK

==== On Cirque du Soleil special events ====
Erika Lemay appears as guest star of Cirque du Soleil in different events, including:

- Press launches of Alegria, Varekai and Quidam
- World Premiere of Worlds Away 3D at Tokyo International Film Festival
- Pan American Games Opening Ceremony
- Ritz-Carlton Montreal 100th Anniversary

== Awards and recognitions ==
- Golden Circus in Roma
- Festival Mondial du Cirque de Demain in Paris
- Festival International du Cirque de Massy
- Festival International du Cirque de Monte-Carlo
- 1st Planetary Carnival of Stage Direction in St.Petersburg
- Nominated as the Queen of Circus by Vanity Fair
- Portrayed in video Objet de Desir by Hollywood icon maker Douglas Kirkland.

== Publications ==
- Almost Perfect: The Life Guide to Creating Your Success Story Through Passion and Fearlessness
- Physical Poetry Alphabet: Starring Erika Lemay
