= America's Got Talent: Extreme =

Spinoff of America's Got Talent

- Genre: Reality; Talent contest
- Created by: Simon Cowell
- Showrunner: Jason Raff
- Presented by: Terry Crews
- Judges: Simon Cowell; Nikki Bella; Travis Pastrana
- Country of origin: United States
- Original language: English
- No. of seasons: 1
- No. of episodes: 4

Production
- Executive producers: Simon Cowell; Sam Donnelly; Jason Raff; Richard Wallace
- Production locations: Atlanta Motor Speedway; Irwindale Speedway
- Production companies: Fremantle; Syco Entertainment

Original release
- Network: NBC
- Release: February 21 – March 14, 2022

Related
- America's Got Talent

America's Got Talent: Extreme (also known as AGT: Extreme) is an American reality television and talent competition series created by Simon Cowell that aired on NBC from February 21 to March 14, 2022, following a sneak peek episode that aired on February 20. The series is a spinoff of America's Got Talent that focuses on stunt performers. Terry Crews hosts the series, with Cowell, Nikki Bella, and Travis Pastrana serving as judges.

Judges and Presenter for America's Got Talent: Extreme

Simon Cowell

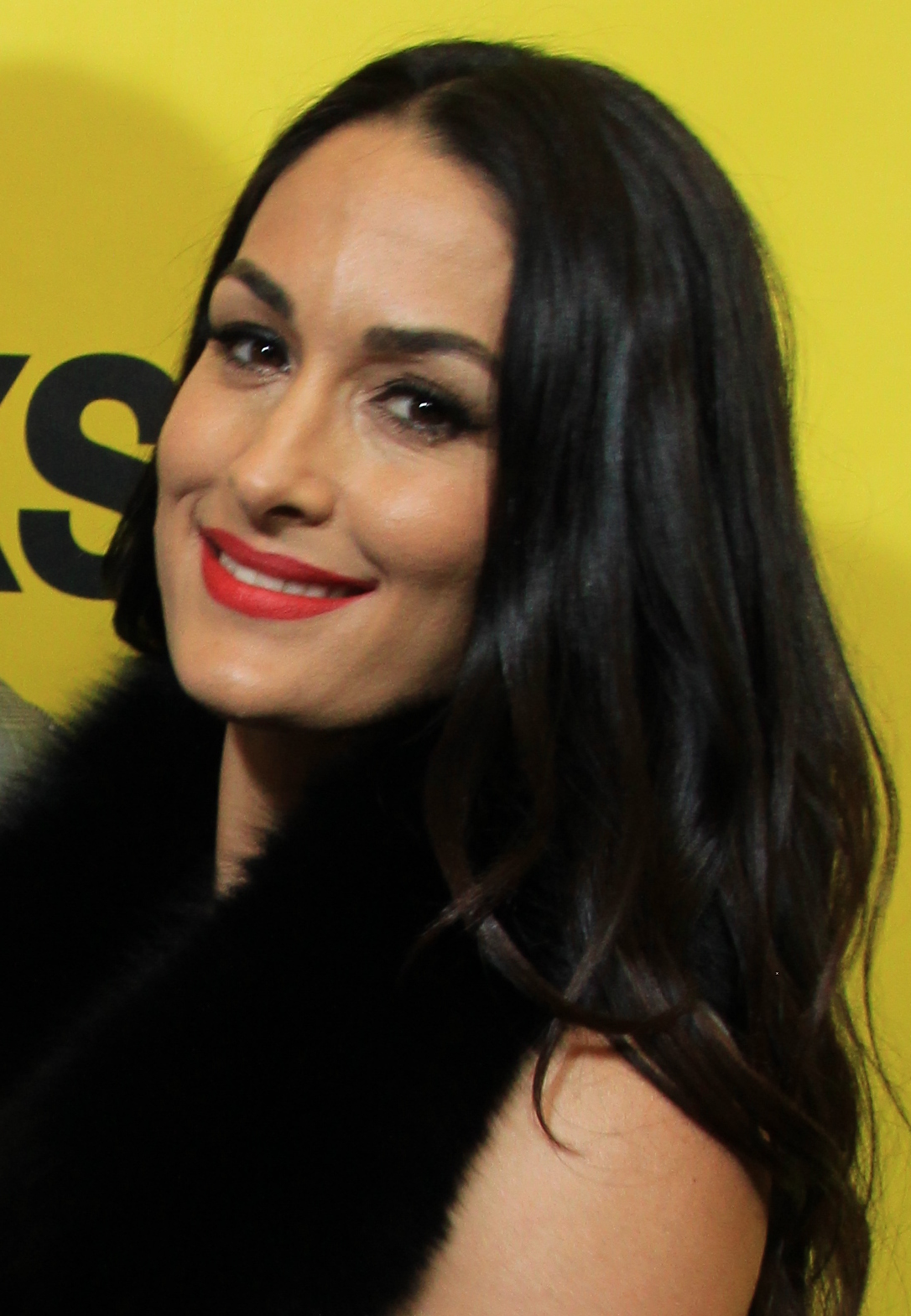
Nikki Bella

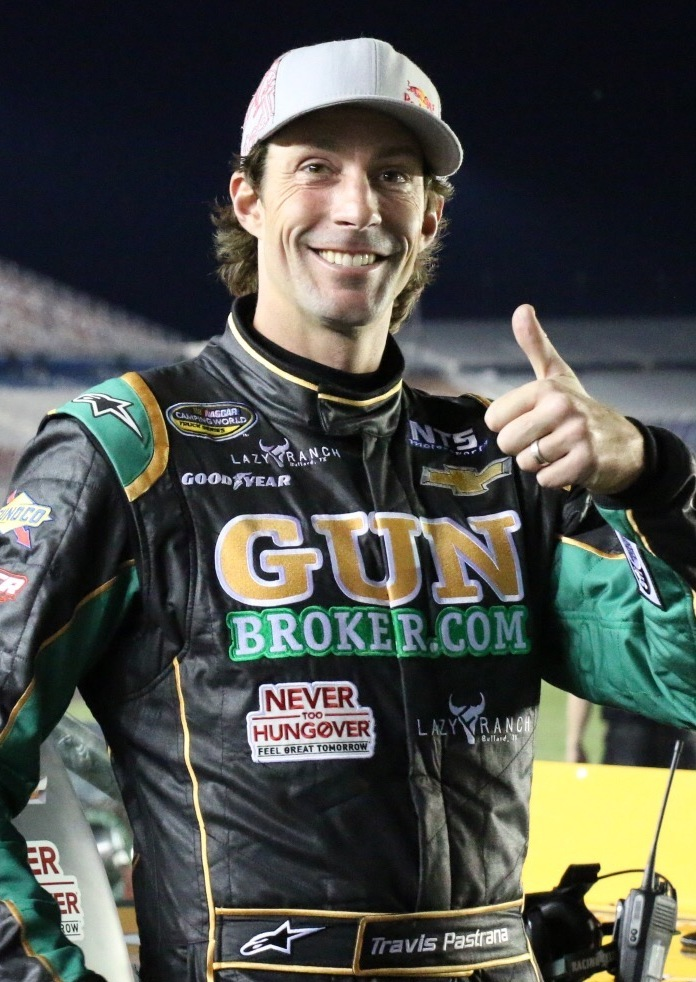
Travis Pastrana

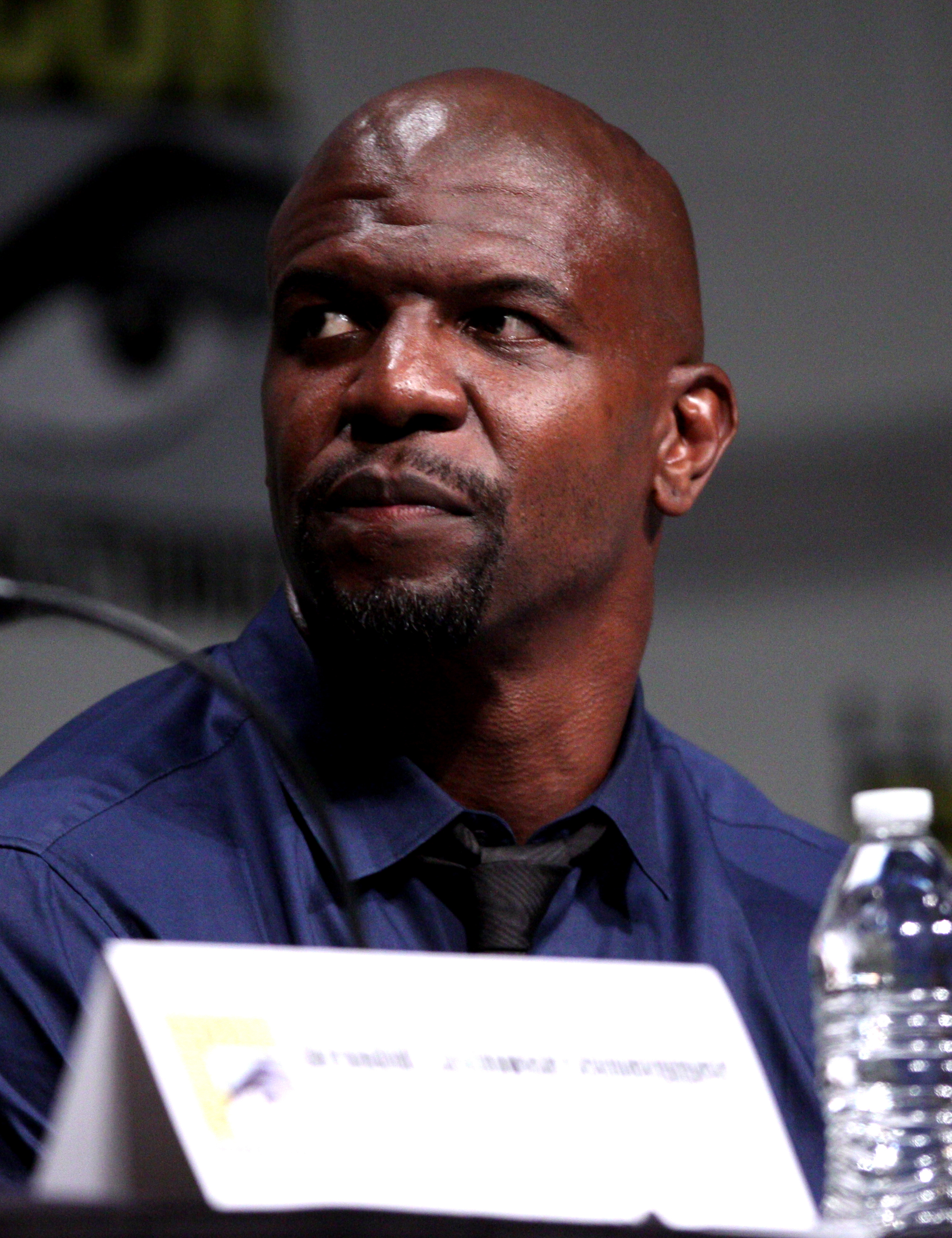
Terry Crews

== Format ==
The series is conducted using a condensed version of the format used in the main America's Got Talent series, and focuses exclusively on larger-scale acts—primarily stunt performers—that are unsuited for a traditional stage setting.

Similarly to the main series, acts that receive a majority vote from the judging panel during their audition performance advance to the finals, the judges may use buzzers to signal their disapproval of an act (with the performance automatically ending if all three judges use their buzzer), while each judge, along with host Terry Crews, can use the "Golden Buzzer" to automatically advance one act of their choice to the finals, regardless of the opinion of the other judges.

In the finale, the acts are further eliminated (with acts now voted on by a panel of "superfans", similarly to America's Got Talent: The Champions), reaching a top four, and then a top two—with the winner receiving $500,000.

== Production ==
On May 14, 2021, NBC announced that it had ordered America's Got Talent: Extreme as the second American spinoff of America's Got Talent, following America's Got Talent: The Champions, with franchise creator Simon Cowell confirmed as an executive producer and judge for the series. On October 1, 2021, it was announced that retired WWE wrestler Nikki Bella and extreme sportsman Travis Pastrana would serve as judges alongside Cowell. Main AGT host Terry Crews also hosts Extreme.

Filming occurred at the Atlanta Motor Speedway in Hampton, Georgia, from September 27 to October 20, 2021. Escape artist Jonathan Goodwin was hospitalized following an accident during a rehearsal, in which he was crushed between two cars in mid-air and fell to the ground whilst trying to escape a straitjacket. A spokesperson confirmed to Variety on October 15 that production had been temporarily suspended. Filming would later resume and wrap in early-January 2022 at the Irwindale Speedway in Irwindale, California.

AGT: Extreme was originally scheduled to premiere in 2022 on NBC's midseason lineup. On January 19, 2022, NBC announced that the premiere had been pushed ahead to February 21, 2022, as American Song Contest had been pushed back to midseason due to COVID-19-related concerns. A half-hour sneak peek aired on February 20, following the primetime broadcast of the 2022 Winter Olympics' closing ceremony.

On May 16, 2022, NBC shelved the series indefinitely.

== Episodes ==
No.	Title	Original release date	Prod. code	U.S. viewers (millions)
0	"AGT: Extreme Sneak Peek"	February 20, 2022	N/A	3.11
1	"Auditions Premiere"	February 21, 2022	101	4.49
2	"Auditions 2"	February 28, 2022	102	3.43
3	"Auditions 3"	March 7, 2022	103	3.26
4	"Auditions End and the $500,000 Finale"	March 14, 2022	104	3.06

== Season overview ==
The following below lists the results of each participant's overall performance in this season:

Winner | Runner-up | Finalist
Eliminated | Golden Buzzer Audition | Wildcard Finalist

Participant	Age(s) ^{1}	Act	From	Preliminary	Result
Aaron Evans	33	Free Runner	Milwaukee, Wisconsin	1	Finalist
Aaron Wheelz	29	Wheelchair Motocross	Las Vegas	1	Runner-up
Alfredo Silva's Cage Riders	24-55	Stunt Performers	Las Vegas	2	Winner
America's Little Sisters	29-45	Wrestling Group	Los Angeles	3	Eliminated
Bruce Cook	34	Motocross Performer	Kelowna, British Columbia, Canada	3	Eliminated
Chloe Chambers	17	Race Car Driver	Monroe, New York	3	Eliminated
Cyndel Flores	23	Aerialist	Sarasota, Florida	3	Finalist
Danny Zzzz	51	Escape Artist	St. Catharines, Ontario, Canada	2	Eliminated
David "The Bullet" Smith	44	Human Cannonball	Salem, Oregon	1	Eliminated
Diako Diaby	27	Professional Skateboarder	Paris, France	2	Eliminated
Dr. Danger & Mary	52, 59	Daredevil Duo	Mendoza, Texas	3	Eliminated
Erika Lemay	38	Aerialist	Lévis, Quebec, Canada	4	Grand-Finalist
Hunter & Lillian	24, 90	Motorcycle Duo	Fairview, Wisconsin	2	Eliminated
Jade Kindar-Martin	47	High Wire Performer	Shelburne, Vermont	2	Grand-Finalist
Jenna Bandy	28	Sports Trick Shooter	Thousand Oaks, California	1	Eliminated
Leeky Da Bikestar	31	Dirt Bike Performer	Queens	1	Eliminated
NomNomSammieBoy	32	Competitive Eater	Brooklyn	3	Eliminated
Shemika Campbell	29	Limbo Dancer	Port of Spain, Trinidad and Tobago	3	Eliminated
The Contraption Kings	27-33	Stunt Performers	United States & Australia	2	Eliminated
The Flying Royals	21-41	Trapeze Artists	Orlando, Florida	2	Eliminated
The JCB Dancing Diggers	22-51	Heavy Machinery Dancers	Savannah, Georgia	4	Eliminated
The Joogsquad	27-35	Stunt Team	Clearwater Beach	1	Eliminated
The Nerveless Nocks	30, 55	Daredevil Duo	Sarasota, Florida	4	Eliminated
Verge Aero	30-56	Drone Precision Group	Philadelphia, Pennsylvania	1	Finalist
William Brandon	32	Fire Dancer	Atlanta, Georgia	4	Eliminated

- ^1 Ages denoted for a participant(s), pertain to their final performance for this season.

=== Preliminaries summary ===
==== Preliminary 1 (February 21) ====
Participant	Order	Buzzes			Result
Participant	Order	Cowell	Bella	Pastrana	Result
Aaron Evans	1				Advanced
The Joogsquad	2				Eliminated
Verge Aero	3				Advanced
David "The Bullet" Smith	4				Eliminated
Jenna Bandy	5				Eliminated
Leeky Da Bikestar	6				Eliminated
Aaron Wheelz	7				Advanced

==== Preliminary 2 (February 28) ====
Participant	Order	Buzzes			Result
Participant	Order	Cowell	Bella	Pastrana	Result
The Contraption Kings	1				Eliminated
Hunter & Lillian	2				Eliminated
Diako Diaby	3				Eliminated
Jade Kindar-Martin	4				Advanced
The Flying Royals	5				Eliminated
Danny Zzzz	6				Eliminated
Alfredo Silva's Cage Riders	7				Advanced

==== Preliminary 3 (March 7) ====
Participant	Order	Buzzes			Result
Participant	Order	Cowell	Bella	Pastrana	Result
Dr. Danger & Mary	1				Eliminated
Chloe Chambers	2				Eliminated
Cyndel Flores	3				Advanced
NomNomSammieBoy	4				Eliminated
Shemika Campbell	5				Eliminated
Bruce Cook	6				Eliminated
America's Little Sisters	7				Eliminated

==== Preliminary 4 (March 14) ====
Participant	Order	Buzzes			Result
Participant	Order	Cowell	Bella	Pastrana	Result
The Nerveless Nocks	1				Eliminated
William Brandon	2				Eliminated
The JCB Dancing Diggers	3				Eliminated
Erika Lemay	4				Advanced

==== Finale (March 14) ====
Guest Performers: Avril Lavigne, Travis Barker & Travis Pastrana

Winner | Runner-up | Top 4

Finalist	sesult
Aaron Evans	Finalist
Aaron Wheelz	Runner-up
Alfredo Silva’s Cage Riders	Winner
Cyndel Flores	Finalist
Erika Lemay	Grand-Finalist
Jade Kindar-Martin	Grand-Finalist
Verge Aero	Finalist

== Ratings ==
Viewership and ratings per episode of America's Got Talent: Extreme
No.	Title	Air date	Rating (18–49)	Viewers (millions)
0	"AGT: Extreme Sneak Peek"	February 20, 2022	0.5	3.11
1	"Auditions Premiere"	February 21, 2022	0.7	4.49
2	"Auditions 2"	February 28, 2022	0.5	3.43
3	"Auditions 3"	March 7, 2022	0.5	3.26
4	"Auditions End and the $500,000 Finale"	March 14, 2022	0.5	3.06
