= Stephen Peer =

American tightrope walker (1840–1887)

Stephen Peer (1840-1887) was a tightrope walker who, though he completed the feat successfully many times, fell to his death while walking a tightrope over Niagara Falls.

== Biography ==
Peer decided to become a tight rope walker when he was 19 years old, inspired by Charles Blondin who had performed the trick over Niagara Falls. Peer had been born and raised in the Stamford Township and wanted to be the first local resident to successfully cross the falls on a tight rope. Peer became an assistant to Henry Bellini in 1873, but that ended when Peer attempted to use Bellini's equipment without his permission. Bellini reportedly tried to cut down a tight rope while Peer was standing on it, but the townsfolk ran Bellini out of town. On June 22, 1887, Peer completed a tight rope walk over the Niagara from the present Whirlpool Bridge and Penn Central Bridge, and back again. Three days later on June 25, 1887, Peer was reportedly with some friends, and had been drinking, and he fell off a tightrope to his death.
