= Didier Pasquette =

French tightrope walker

Didier Pasquette's high wire walk in Glasgow, July 22, 2007. Photographer: Grant Gibson

Didier Pasquette is a noted French tightrope walker.

Pasquette studied with Philippe Petit (famous for his high wire walk between the former Twin Towers of the World Trade Center in New York in 1974) and in 1989 received his diploma from the Centre National des Arts du Cirque in Châlons-en-Champagne. He also studied Chinese acrobatics in Nanchang.

For six years, he performed in partnership with Jade Kindar-Martin in theatrical high wire acts for Camion Funambule. Pasquette and Kindar-Martin also became known for their dramatic skywalks.

== Notable walks ==
- 1997 – Pasquette and Jade Kindar-Martin walked a 430-metre wire 30 metres above the River Thames in London, setting a Guinness World Record.
- 1999 – At midnight on December 31, 1999, Pasquette walked a high wire running along the Greenwich Meridian in Villers sur Mer as part of the Millennium celebrations in France.
- 2001 – Pasquette successfully walked a high wire from the Rosenborg Drill Ground in Copenhagen to the highest tower of Rosenborg Castle. The only previous attempt was in 1827 when Dutch tightrope acrobat Christian Roat was killed after the wire collapsed.
- 2005 – Pasquette walked on a wire stretched high above the Stade de France in Paris.
- 2007 – Pasquette performed a high wire walk at the Red Road flat complex in Glasgow between three tower blocks 53 metres apart and 100 metres above the ground. Film of the attempt was incorporated into High Wire, a multi-screen film and video installation by Catherine Yass for the 2008 Glasgow International Festival of Contemporary Visual Arts.
- 2010 – On September 23, 2010, at 6:30 p.m., Pasquette successfully walked a 150-foot wire tied between two replicas of the Statue of Liberty atop the 23-story Liberty Building in Buffalo, New York. The feat took about three minutes. Pasquette twice stopped during his walk to wave to the crowd. Pasquette lifted his right leg and waved his cap the first time. The second time, he went to a knee and waved his cap again from side to side. The weather was approximately 70 degrees Fahrenheit with a slight breeze.

== Sources ==
- Biography on the High Wire project site.
- Stephen McGinty, Glasgow proves tall order even for daredevil, The Scotsman 23 July 2007
- Taking risks for art with Didier Pasquette, Metro, April 14, 2008
- Nadine Champenois, Tête en l’air et pieds sur terre, Portrait of Didier Pasquette (in French), Petites Affiches Matot Braine, May 28, 2005, N. 7134.
