= Adili Wuxor =

Tightrope walker

Adili Wuxor (Uyghur: ئادىل ھوشۇر, romanized: Adil Hoshur; Chinese: 阿迪力·吾休尔; pinyin: Ādílì·Wúxiū'ěr; born July 1, 1971) is a Chinese tightrope walker who was reported to have set a new world record on July 1, 2010, after he spent 60 days walking on a tightrope in the Bird's Nest Stadium. Wuxor is an ethnic Uighur from Xinjiang Province. He has been dubbed the "Prince of tightrope walking" by national and international media.

== Controversy ==
On July 2, 2010, the Chinese state-run Xinhua news agency reported that Wuxor set a Guinness World Record for tightrope walking. It was later reported by Thomson Reuters, however, that Wuxor's achievement was not recognized by the London-based Guinness World Records. The certificate Wuxor received was from Shanghai Great World, whose Chinese name, "Jinisi", sounds similar to the Mandarin pronunciation of "Guinness". The firm is not connected to Guinness World Records, but is managed by the Shanghai Media Group, run by the Shanghai government. According to Guinness, the world record is held by Jorge Ojeda-Guzman, who spent 205 days on a wire in 1993.
