= Henry Johnson (acrobat) =

British acrobat, equestrian gymnast and tightrope walker

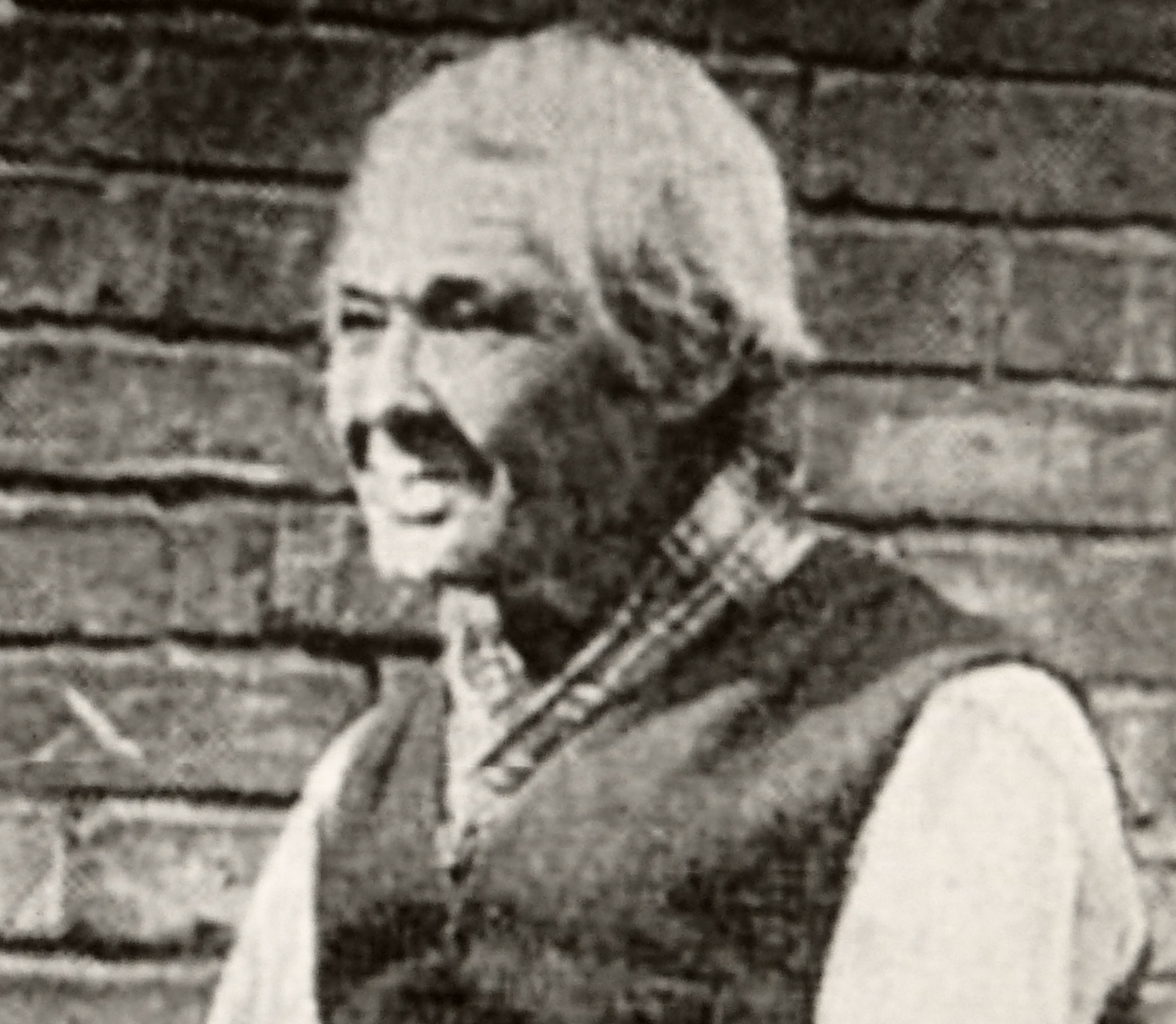
- Henry Johnson, 1905
- Born: 25 December 1806; Norwich, Norfolk, England
- Died: 12 June 1910 (aged 103); Grantham, Lincolnshire, England
- Occupations: In his prime: a circus acrobat, tightrope walker and equestrian gymnast; Later: a street performer
- Years active: 1820–1892
- Known for: Sanger's and Hughes' circuses; Royal performances for the: Daoguang Emperor, William IV, Queen Victoria and Edward VII

Henry Johnson (25 December 1806 – 12 June 1910) was an English acrobat, equestrian gymnast, and tightrope walker for Hughes' and Sanger's circuses in the early 19th century.

He was orphaned at a young age, and started life in poverty, however by his early twenties he had performed before the Emperor of China. After leaving the circuses and teaming up with Mullaba the Chinese Juggler, he performed privately by Royal Command for William IV. As a solo act, he performed for Queen Victoria several times, and again for the Prince of Wales (later Edward VII).

At the beginning of the 20th century he was fêted and interviewed as a centenarian in Grantham, Lincolnshire, where he had settled with his wife and daughter. Those interviews give an insight into the life of a circus and street performer of the early 19th century.

== Background ==
Henry Johnson "had no recollection of his parents who died when he was an infant". He informed interviewers that he was born at St Mary's, Norwich, on 25 December 1806. (Note: "Norfolk, transcripts of Church of England birth, marriage and death. Archdeacon transcripts 1600–1812". ancestry.co.uk. Ancestry. "From register of St Mary's, Diss, Norfolk. Henry Johnson, son of John Pond and Susan his wife, late Susan Johnson spinster, was born July 23, 1806, and privately baptised July 25, 1806" (Possible parentage of Henry Johnson – an orphan who may not have known his true birth date)) When he was two years old, his father died and his family struggled to survive, eating swedes from the fields because they could not afford bread. He had a brother who was an ostler.

Johnson remembered the arrival of news of the Battle of Waterloo in 1815:

First the news was that we had lost and then had won, and then again had lost, and people were almost crazy with excitement, because they said that Bony (Bonaparte) would come and make slaves of us, and mothers used to frighten naughty children by saying, If you don't keep quiet I'll let Bony-part have ye! There was no telegraph in those days, and the news was brought from the coast by couriers, and it used to be said that the false news was made by some people just to make some money before the truth became known.

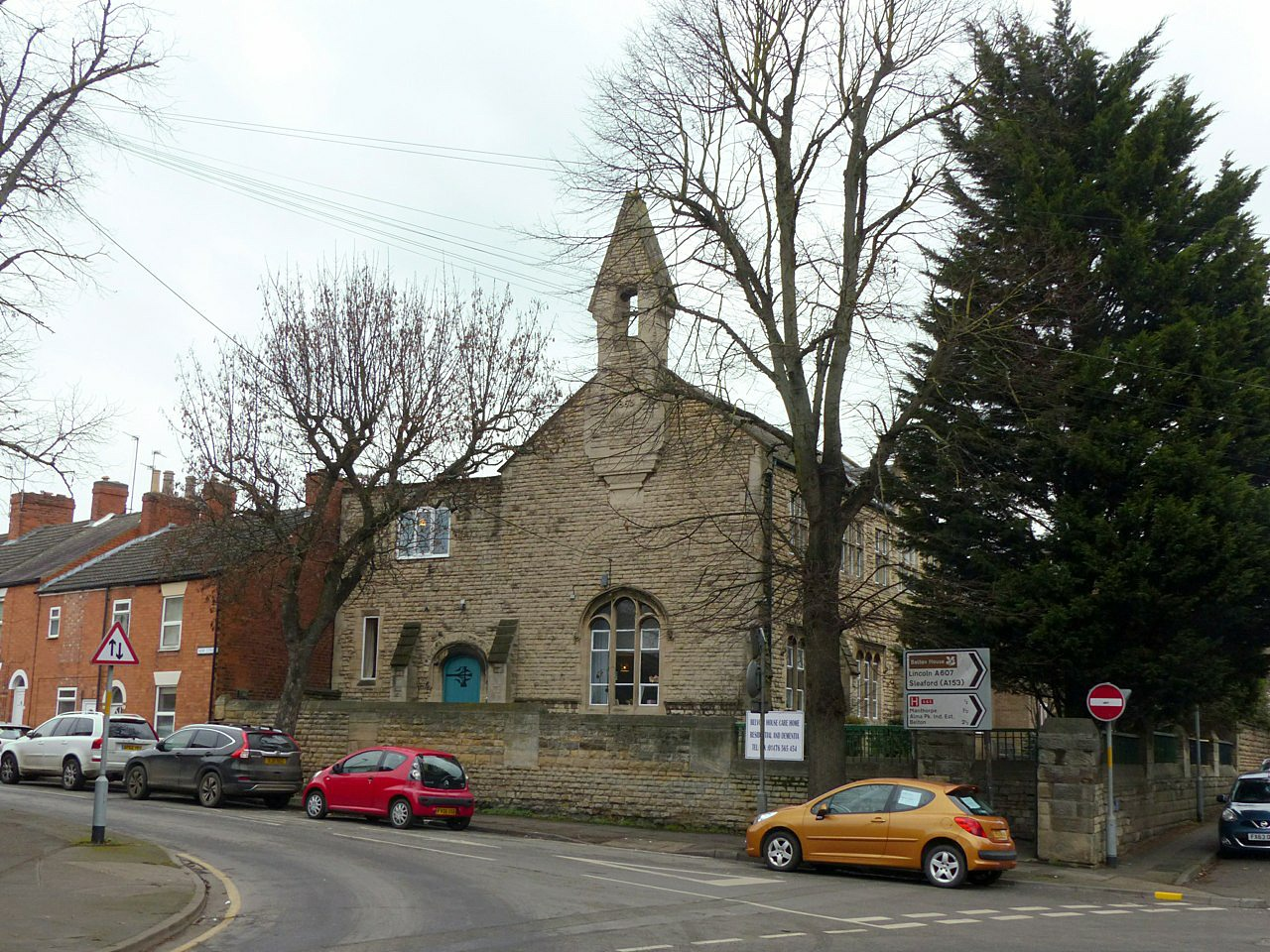
New Street, Grantham, where Johnson lived

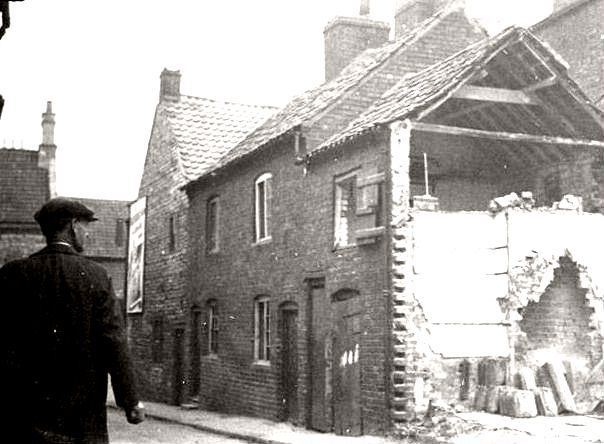
James Street, Grantham, 1937

Johnson married Mary Ann (Brightlingsea 1826 – Grantham 1906), (Note: Deaths Mar 1906 Johnson Mary Ann 83 Grantham 7a 320. This death was confirmed as the wife of acrobat Henry Johnson in the Nottingham Journal 24 December 1908. The following is a possible registration of their marriage: Marriages Dec 1855 Johnson Henry and Beeson Mary Grantham 7a 853.) and they had at least one child, a daughter. Around 1866 Johnson and his wife moved to a "small tenement ... with a combined sitting and bedroom on the ground floor" at 6 New Street, Grantham, but he continued to travel the country until 1885. Until around 1905 he was "a noted pedestrian, occasionally indulging in a 15–20 miles (24–32 km) ramble". At his 100th birthday he received a congratulatory letter from Edward VII via Lord Knollys. Soon after his centenary, Johnson was invited by William Lee, the Mayor of Grantham, to his "dinner to old folks ... [Johnson's] arrival was duly announced, and a cheer was given as the old fellow slowly walked, but without assistance to his seat".

Following Johnson's 101st birthday, the Sporting Times noted with wry humour, "That is the worst of those dangerous professions. The people who practise them so frequently escape accidents". Johnson said that he did not like cigarettes, that he smoked a pipe, and that he "never was a teetotaller". At the age of 102, Johnson was living in James Street, Grantham (James Street was demolished in 1937 and 1960). In his last years, Johnson lived with his daughter Mrs Bullimore who was a lodging-house keeper. By that time, he was in receipt of parish support of six shillings (equivalent to £39.5 in 2023) per week. Johnson remained fit enough to "walk about the streets" until the final two weeks of his life. He died in Grantham on 12 June 1910, aged 103. (Note: Deaths Jun 1910 Johnson Henry 103 Grantham 7a 248)

== Career ==
=== Skill preparation ===
Johnson "took to horses from his infancy". He was encouraged to become a jockey, but he was more interested in imitating the gymnastic street-entertainers in Norwich market place:

In the streets he had seen travelling gymnasts with their carpets, and he believed that he could himself manage such performances. Accordingly he had laid himself out for the business and, as he remarked, came in for a great deal of punishment, cricking his back and so forth, but he triumphed.

In Johnson's youth, circuses were mainly strolling street-players, often treated as vagabonds. Sometimes pedlars would work alongside a very small street circus, so as to attract trade. However, there were some circus troupes which included highly skilled performers. Circus performers of Johnson's travelling generation were no less able than the well-paid late-nineteenth century celebrity circus performers, but the life of the earlier circus generation was hard and they often went hungry.

=== Occupation ===
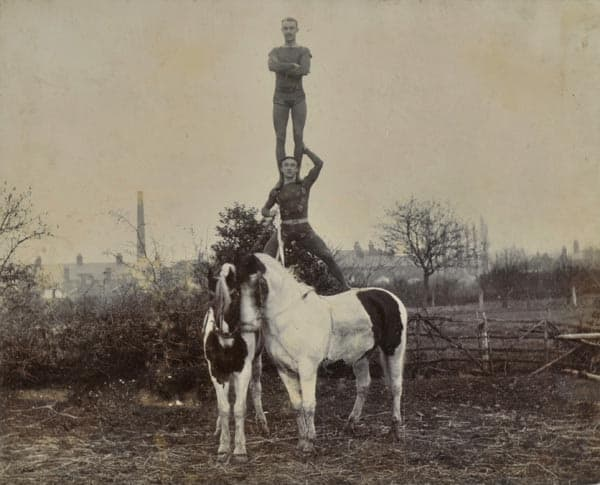
A Sanger's Circus act of the type performed by Henry Johnson

Johnson's rambling responses to interview questions gave rise to the publication of several contradictory versions of his career. Here is one:

Although I always liked horses, I didn't merely want to drive other people. I wanted to drive 'em myself. So I managed to get in with a small travelling circus, and before my bones were set they made an acrobat of me. When I was about 12 or 14 I joined Sanger's Circus, and from them I went to Hughes' Circus. It was with Hughes' Circus that I went out to China. There was a juggler among us, but the Chinese didn't think much of him. There wasn't anything he could teach them, you see. But it was different with me. They couldn't do what I could do ... Well, I was an all round gymnast, I reckon, and I could stand on my head on a pole, do somersaults on a horse, and do somersaults blindfolded, too.

A second version of Johnson's early career is as follows. Having "a desire to travel the country", Johnson joined Hughes' Wild Beast Show and Circus, (Note: This company was started by the equestrian Charles Hughes (1747–1797), and was originally based at a London amphitheatre, the Royal Circus and Equestrian Philharmonic Academy. See Short history of the circus.) and was a "fully-qualified member of the equestrian staff" by the age of fourteen years. By the time the show visited Pekin, China, he was earning £4 per week (equivalent to £403.87 in 2023). When his wage was cut by one quarter, he left Hughes' Wild Beast Show and joined Sanger's Circus.

A third version of the story says that he first joined the original Sanger's Circus at age six (working for the father of Lord George Sanger), and worked for Sanger for eight years, then at the age of fourteen joined Hughes' Circus at Durham, and that it was with Hughes' Circus that he performed in Pekin. Johnson said, "I was an all-round gymnast, as I reckoned, a rope walker, and an equestrian. Barebacked I could do pretty well anything".

After leaving the circus in 1828, and returning from Pekin to Durham, Johnson formed an independent partnership in 1830 with Pat Feeney who was known as Mullaba the Chinese Juggler or Old Malabar, and that association lasted until 1862. It ended, as Johnson said, "because we couldn't agree". After that, he worked solo. Johnson followed his acrobatic career for over seventy years in total, working ultimately as a street performer, and retiring in 1892.

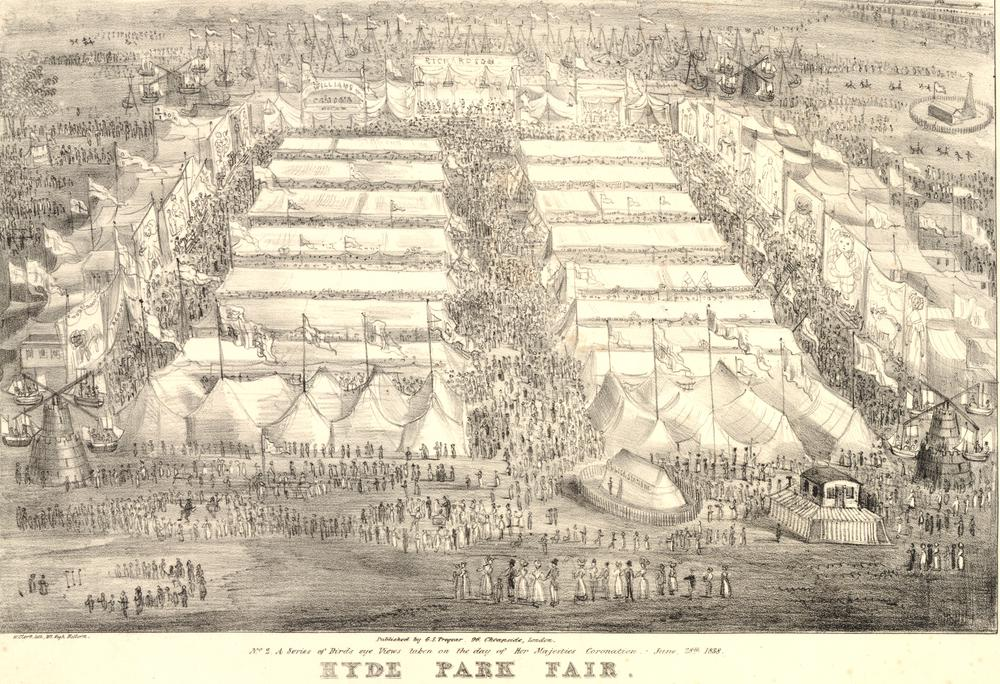
Hyde Park Fair, 1838

Johnson assisted at the "huge" 1838 Coronation Fair at Hyde Park, London, in celebration of Queen Victoria's accession: "All showdom was there":

As the boom of distant guns announced the departure of the young Queen for Westminster Abbey the showmen struck their gongs and unfurled their cloths, while the keepers of the booths and stalls rolled up their canvas fronts and commenced operations. The theatre in the park played Benjamin Bowbell or the Illustrious Stranger many hundreds of times ... The fair [was] open for several consecutive weeks ... A pot of beer rose to a shilling and a penny loaf to sixpence ... Those were the days of the fat giantesses, the fair Circassians, the Hottentot Venus, the dwarfs, the living skeletons, the two-headed boys, the performing pig, the fortune-telling horse. People had never dreamed of a variety programme in a veritable palace, and even the gentry patronised the booth.

Johnson saw gratuitous cruelty to animals by certain circus performers. In the performance of the challenging Tuppence More and Up Goes the Donkey, a skilled performer would tie a donkey to the top of a ladder, offer to balance it on high, and refuse to perform the feat until the audience had given him "tuppence more", i.e. more money. However, in the 1830s Queen Victoria's mother the Duchess of Kent ordered the performance of this feat to "cease immediately".

The most that an acrobat could earn [in the 1830s] was a few shillings a week, or if he was particularly brilliant, a few pounds. [By 1900] a smart acrobat or juggler [was] capable of commanding as much money a week as his predecessors did in half a year or more.

=== Performing for royalty ===
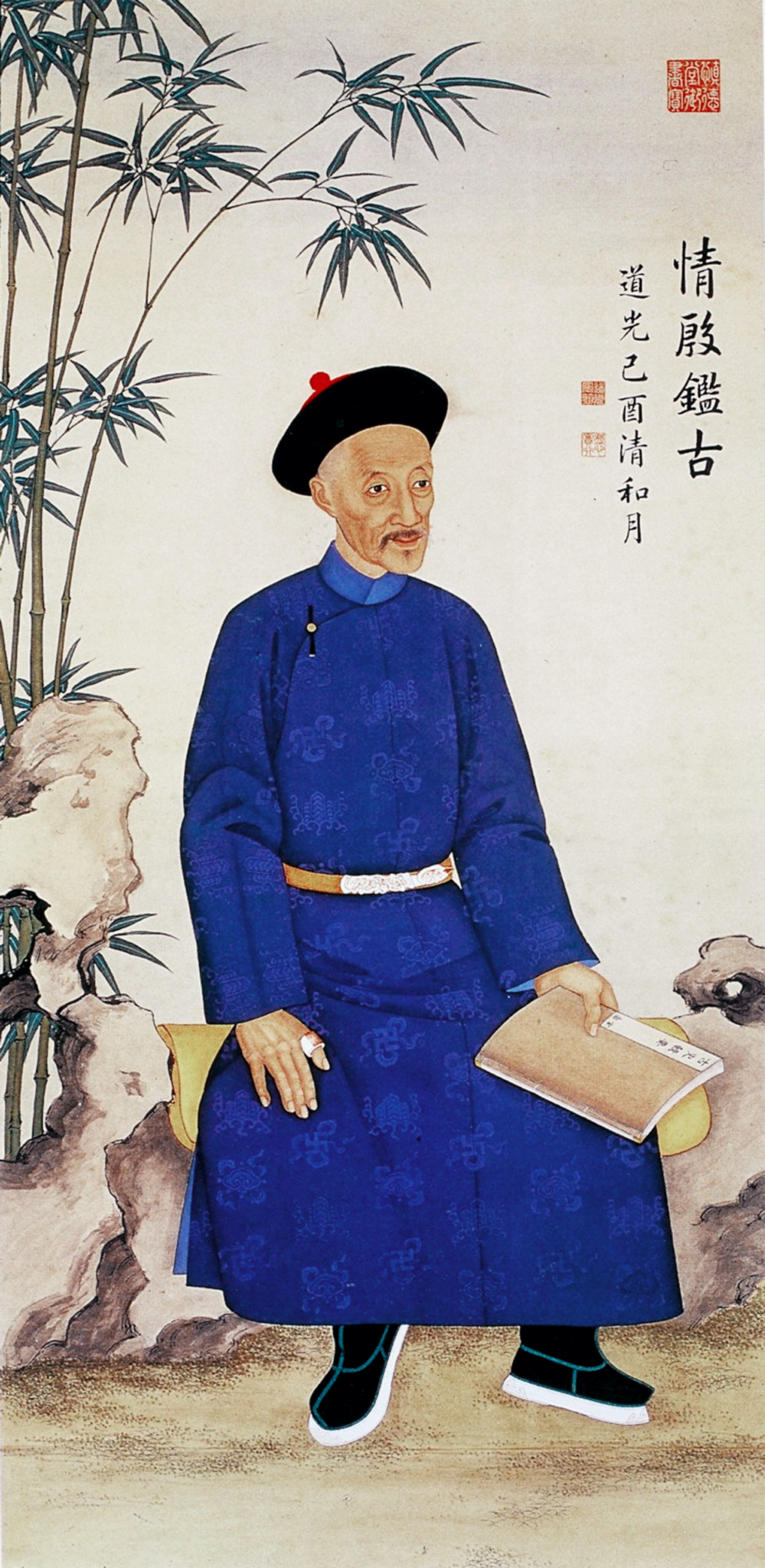
Johnson performed before the Daoguang Emperor

In Pekin, around 1828, Johnson performed with Hughes' Circus for the Daoguang Emperor, Emperor of China.

Johnson was "famous" as a young man. In 1830, he performed in Aylesbury with Pat Feeney (Mullaba) for Baron Rothschild and William IV. The day after that, the pair performed by Royal Command for William IV, on a temporary stage on the lawn of Buckingham Palace. Johnson said:

His Majesty was so delighted with my partner and myself, what with Mullaba's juggling and my gymnastics, that he ordered the pair of us to go to Buckingham Palace. There was no railway then. We had to go by coach – that is, the king and ourselves, His Majesty, of course, riding inside. There were plenty of highwaymen in those days, but we hadn't even an outrider, though perhaps there was an escort behind. However we had no trouble. At Buckingham Palace there was a large stage erected for Mullaba and myself, and two bands were present. There would be about a hundred great people in the audience. Mullaba and I did well, though I say it, and His Majesty gave us fifty guineas each (equivalent to £5,937 in 2023), and a licence to perform anywhere we wanted in England, Scotland, Ireland and Wales, at any market town or fair. My licence got burned in a fire at Colchester.

The fire was possibly the extensive Colchester High Street fire of 24 December 1834. Johnson performed as a solo act for Queen Victoria before and after her coronation. He said:

I had my carpet outside the Royal Hotel at Tunbridge Wells when the Duchess of Kent came down to me with the Princess Victoria and gave me £10 (equivalent to £1,214 in 2023). Of course I never could juggle. I never went in for it. My business was always gymnastics. To call public attention I had a small drum and pipes, which were my orchestra. But the Duchess of Kent and her late Majesty were delighted with my performances, and that was enough for me ... I have seen the late Queen many times since, and performed before her at Epsom and elsewhere. On one occasion she sent me a couple of sovereigns.

Johnson performed for Edward VII (when Prince of Wales) at Sandringham House in the 1860s, or according to another version, around 1875. "It was at a dinner to the Royal tenantry when Johnson [claimed] to have danced a hornpipe on his head upon glasses supported by barrels".

== Mullaba the Chinese Juggler ==
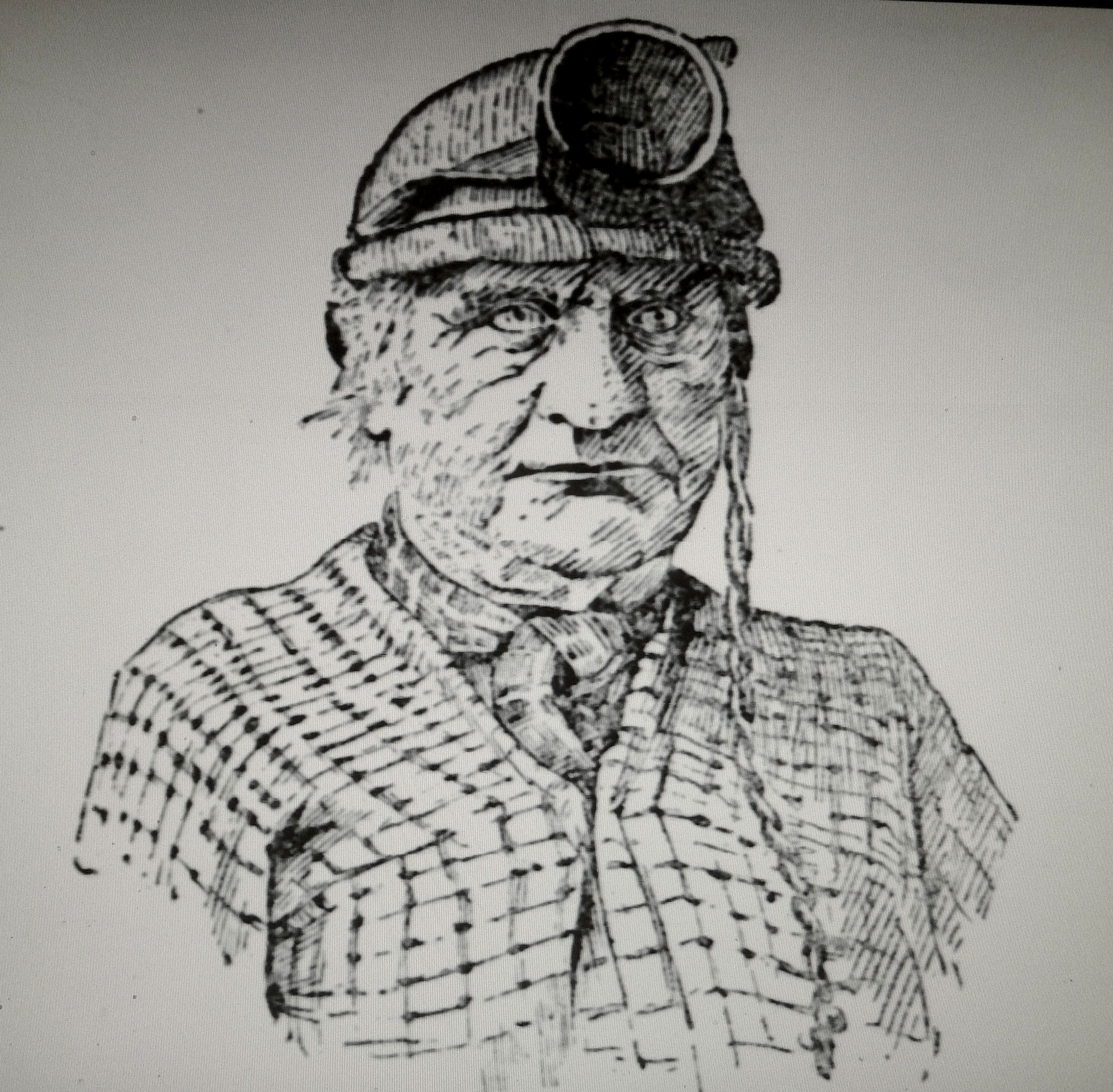
Patrick Feeney (Old Malabar), wearing the cup in which he would catch a ball during his act

Patrick Feeney, known as Mullaba, Malabar or Old Malabar, was the son of "decent, working people". He was born in Sligo, Ireland, on 16 March 1800, and was trained by the Chinese-Tartar juggler Chu Chan. Lord George Sanger recalled seeing "American Malabar" doing the Tuppence More trick with a donkey at the Hyde Park Fair of 1838. In 1910 the circus performer Edward Pablo recalled seeing Malabar in 1880, "walking about the streets [of Glasgow] rigged up in his old Chinese dress", although he did not remember Henry Johnson. Another report says that Malabar first performed in his own booth at the Border Fairs in Scotland around 1848, and continued at the fairs there, including at Selkirk and Edinburgh, until around 1878. Malabar was a "big, strong man, with a huge voice ... He was a wyse-like man, with strong features". He had once hired Lord George Sanger as a young man to patter (or attract trade) and to take part in the performance. Malabar was 6 feet 1 inch (1.85 m) tall; he was a "tall, commanding figure, in gaudy robes". His tricks included catching a ball in a cup attached to his forehead, and swallowing an 18-inch (46 cm) sword. However, Malabar did have issues with alcohol, according to Lord George Sanger, who was dropped on top of the crowd by a drunken Malabar on one occasion. In old age he was mocked for boasting that he had performed before kings, but Johnson's interviews confirm that he performed before William IV. His wife assisted him at his sideshows, and died around 1872. "The last appearance of Malabar in public was on the occasion of the great procession at the laying of the foundation of the New Municipal Buildings in George's Square", Glasgow, on 6 October 1883. Feeney died in Glasgow, on 13 November 1883.
