= Jade Kindar-Martin =

American circus performer (born 1974)

- Born: February 16, 1974 (age 52); Vermont, U.S.
- Occupations: Tightrope walker; circus performer
- Spouse: Karine Mauffrey (m. 2004)
- Children: 3
- Website: funambule.com

Jade Kindar-Martin (born February 16, 1974) is an American highwire walker and circus performer.

== Career ==
Kindar-Martin started performing on the wire at the age of 14 with Circus Smirkus, a youth circus based in Vermont. Following his graduation from Champlain Valley Union High School in 1992, he went on to further his studies in the circus arts in Montreal, Quebec, Canada at the Ecole Nationale de Cirque and then at the Centre National des Arts du Cirque in Châlons-en-Champagne, France. Kindar-Martin there came under the tutelage and mentorship of highwire artist Rudy Omankowski Jr. and began his partnership with Didier Pasquette.

Together, Kindar-Martin and Pasquette soon began touring worldwide, as well as performing their own brand of highwire theatre as part of the Camion Funambule. In the six years they performed together, the two became known equally for their highly technical bicycle acrobatics and dramatic skywalks, including their Guinness World Record-setting double skywalk across the River Thames in London in 1997.

In 1999, Kindar-Martin was recruited by Cirque du Soleil for a new show, La Nouba, in Orlando, Florida, where he performed until January 2004.

In the summer of 2004, Jade married fellow Cirque du Soleil performer and stunt woman Karine Mauffrey, high up in the air on a wire stretched over the grounds of the Château de Chantilly in Chantilly, France. Kindar-Martin and his wife now split their time between Los Angeles, California, and their home in the south of France.

In the summer of 2005, Jade joined The Flying Wallendas, the world-famous highwire family, and performs regularly with them in the "Seven-Man Pyramid".

In May 2007 in Seoul, South Korea, Kindar-Martin competed in the First World Highwire Championships. Kindar-Martin, along with 18 other highwire walkers from around the world, competed for the fastest crossing of the kilometer-long wire over the Han River. With a time of 0:11:35.54, Kindar-Martin won the bronze medal, 13 seconds behind first place. In completing the walk, all who made it across now also share a new Guinness World Record for longest highwire walk. A longer skywalk may have been accomplished by Rudy Omankowski Jr., Kindar-Martin's mentor.

In 2022, Kindar-Martin took place on AGT: Extreme where he finished as a Grand Finalist.

In 2023, Kindar-Martin was a suit performer for the indigo rabbit animatronic Bonnie in the Five Nights at Freddy's film.

== Personal life ==
Kindar-Martin married his wife Karine Mauffrey in 2004. Together they have three children, two of whom are actors Raphael Luce who is best known for his role of Young Henry Creel in the fourth season of Netflix series Stranger Things., and his youngest daughter, Jophielle Love, known for her roles as Violet Barnes on the soap opera General Hospital and as Cooper Ormewood on the ABC series Will Trent.

== Filmography ==
Film
Year	Title	Role	Notes	Ref.
2003	Cirque du Soleil: Solstrom	Romeo - High Wire		
2003	NCIS	Stunts		
2015	K.C. Undercover	Stunt Double	Stunt: High-Wire Performer	
2015	The Walk	Circus High Wire Performer and Stunt Double	Stunt: Joseph Gordon Levitt	
2017	Mystère au Louvre	High-Wire Performer and Stunt Double	Stunt: Cyril Descours	
2018	The Purge	Stunts		
2018	ELI	Utility Stunts		
2019	Eli	Stunts		
2019	Looking for Alaska	Lead Stunt Double		
2019	Troop Zero	Stunt Performer		
2019	Queen & Slim	Stunts	As Jade Kinder Martin	
2020	The Secrets We Keep	Utility Stunts		
2020	Filthy Rich	Stunt Rigger		
2020	Unhinged	Stunt Double	Stunt: Austin P. McKenzie	
2020	Bill & Ted Face the Music	Stunt Rigger	Uncredited	
2020	Your Honor	Stunt Rigging and Stunt Double	Stunt: Hunter Dooh	
2021	Leverage: Redemption	Bodyguard		
2022	America's Got Talent: Extreme	Himself	FireWire Walker	
2022	Interview with the Vampire	Stunt Double	Stunt: Lestat	
2022	Causeway	Stunt Driver	Uncredited	
2023	Mayfair Witches	Stunt Rigger and Stunt Coordinator		
2023	Crater	Utility Stunts		
2023	The Killer	Stunt Rigger		
2023	Five Nights at Freddy's	Bonnie the Rabbit	Suit performer	
2023	Fast Charlie	Stunt Rigger		
