= Tightrope walking =

Skill of walking along a taut wire or rope

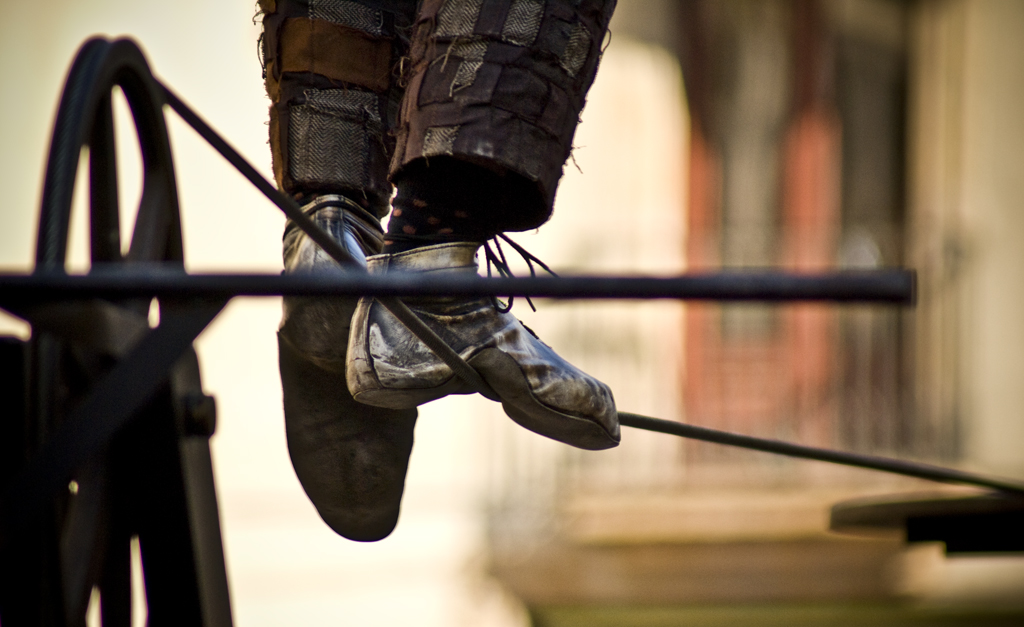
The feet of a tightrope walker

Tightrope walking, also called funambulism, is the skill of walking along a thin wire or rope. It has a long tradition in various countries and is commonly associated with the circus. Other skills similar to tightrope walking include slack rope walking and slacklining.

== Types ==
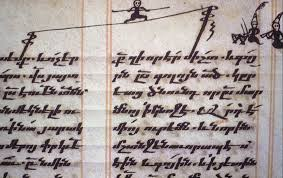
Tightrope walking, Armenian manuscript, 1688

Tightwire is the skill of maintaining balance while walking along a tensioned wire between two points. It can be done either using a balancing tool (umbrella, fan, balance pole, etc.) or "freehand", using only one's body to maintain balance. Typically, tightwire performances either include dance or object manipulation. Object manipulation acts include a variety of props in their acts, such as clubs, rings, hats, or canes. Tightwire performers have even used wheelbarrows with passengers, ladders, and animals in their act. The technique to maintain balance is to keep the performer's centre of mass above their support point—usually their feet.

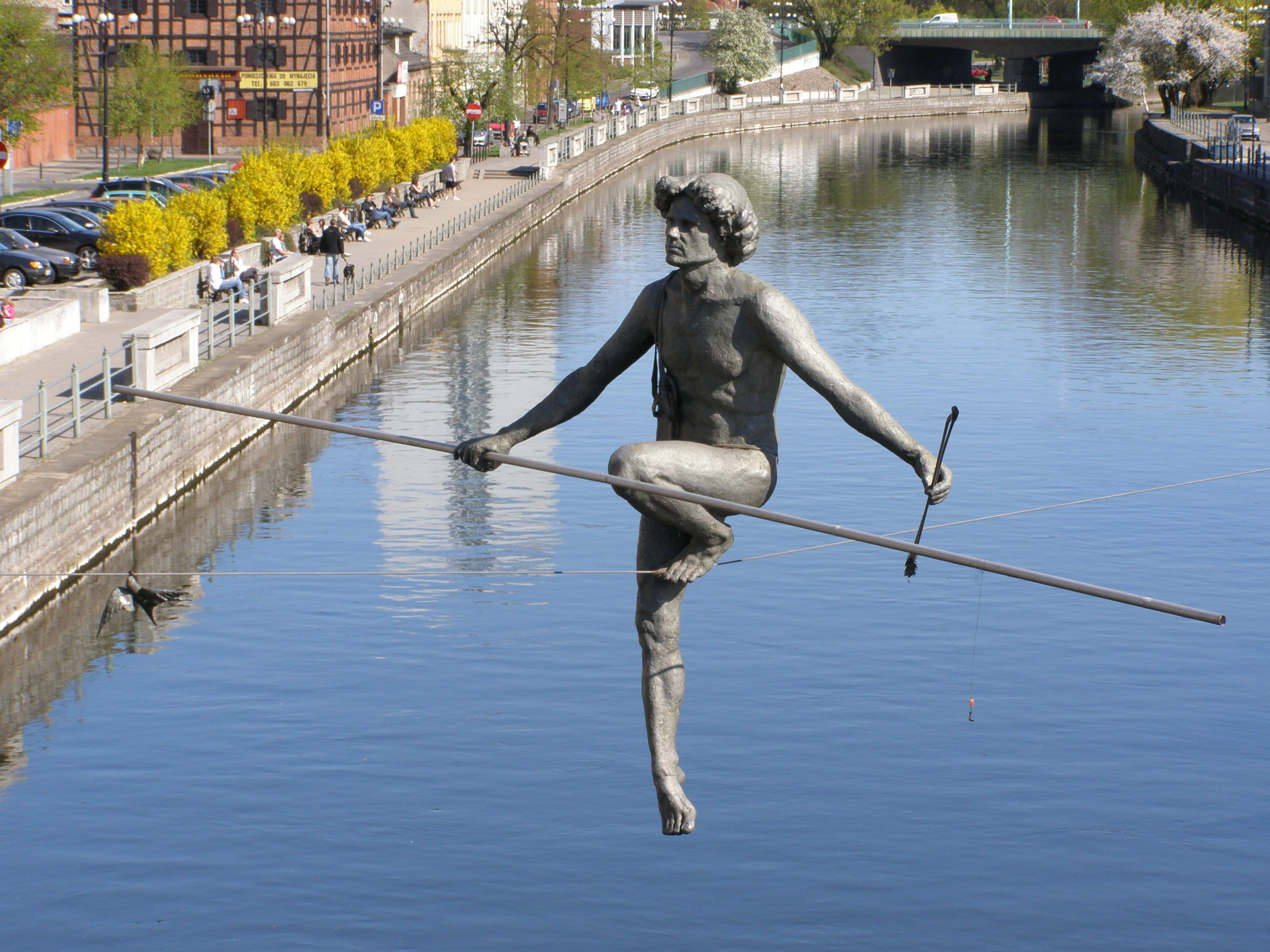
Man Crossing the River balancing sculpture across the Brda River in Bydgoszcz, Poland

Highwire is a form of tightwire walking but performed at much greater height. Although there is no official height when tightwire becomes highwire, generally a wire over 20 feet (6 m) high are regarded as a highwire act.

Skywalk is a form of highwire which is performed at great heights and length. A skywalk is performed outdoors between tall buildings, gorges, across waterfalls or other natural and man-made structures.

== Ropes ==
If the "lay" of the rope (the orientation of the constituent strands, the "twist" of a rope) is in one direction, the rope can twist on itself as it stretches and relaxes. Underfoot, this could be hazardous to disastrous in a tightrope. One solution is for the rope core to be made of steel cable, laid in the opposite direction to the outer layers, so that twisting forces balance each other out.

== Biomechanics ==
Acrobats maintain their balance by positioning their centre of mass directly over their base of support, i.e. shifting most of their weight over their legs, arms, or whatever part of their body they are using to hold them up. When they are on the ground with their feet side by side, the base of support is wide in the lateral direction but narrow in the sagittal (back-to-front) direction. In the case of highwire-walkers, their feet are parallel with each other, one foot positioned in front of the other while on the wire. Therefore, a tightwire walker's sway is side to side, their lateral support having been drastically reduced. In both cases, whether side by side or parallel, the ankle is the pivot point.

A wire-walker may use a pole for balance or may stretch out their arms perpendicular to their trunk in the manner of a pole. This technique provides several advantages. It distributes mass away from the pivot point, thereby increasing the moment of inertia. This reduces angular acceleration, so a greater torque is required to rotate the performer over the wire. The result is less tipping. In addition, the performer can also correct sway by rotating the pole. This will create an equal and opposite torque on the body.

Tightwire-walkers typically perform in very thin and flexible, leather-soled slippers with a full-length suede or leather sole to protect the feet from abrasions and bruises, while still allowing the foot to curve around the wire. Though very infrequent in performance, amateur, hobbyist, or inexperienced funambulists will often walk barefoot so that the wire can be grasped between the big and second toe. This is more often done when using a rope, as the softer and silkier fibres are less taxing on the bare foot than the harder and more abrasive braided wire.

== Famous tightrope artists ==
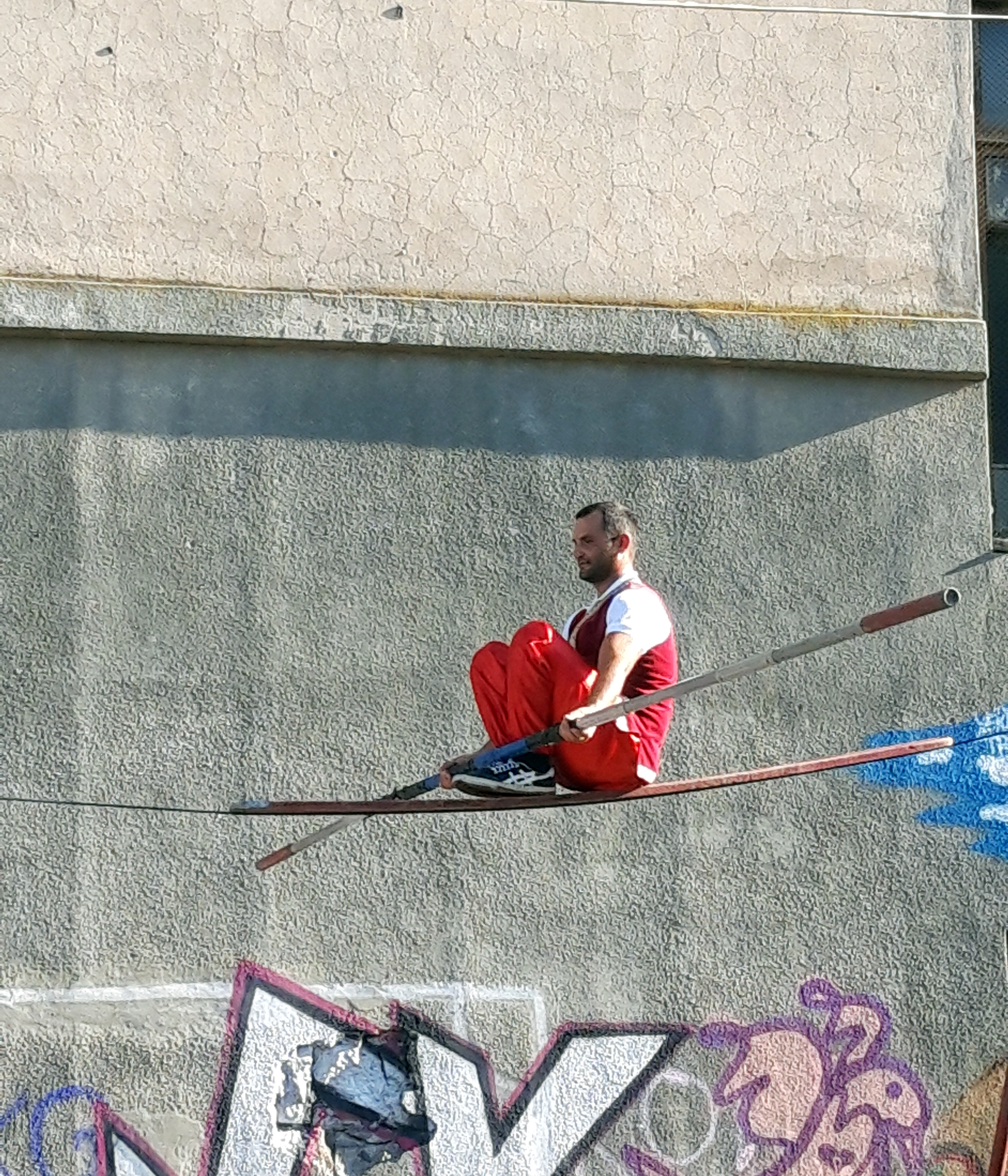
Pahlavan games, is a type of dance and performance that has come down to our days from the pagan period. It holds a unique place in the theatrical and dance heritage of the Armenian people.

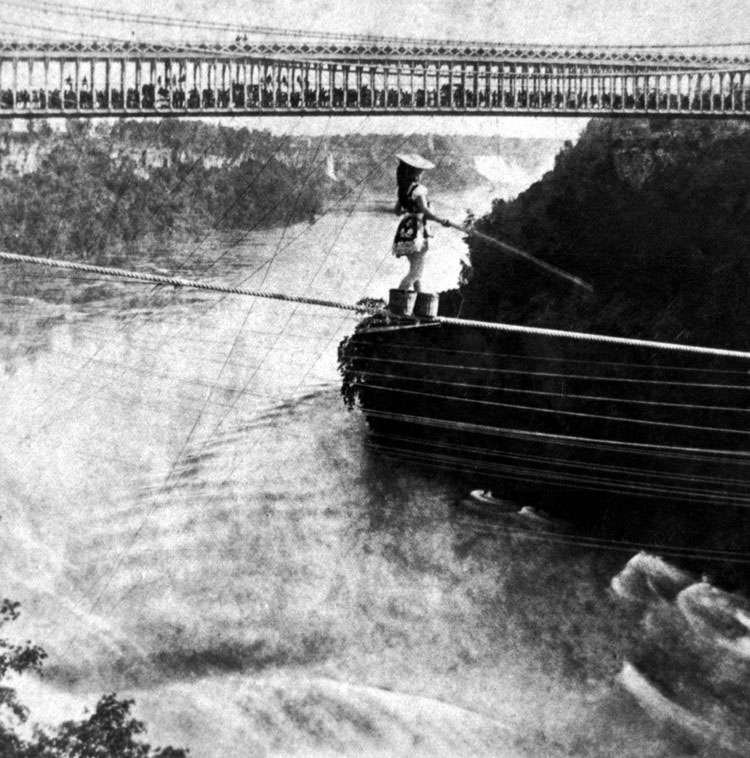
Maria Spelterini crossing Niagara Falls on July 4, 1876

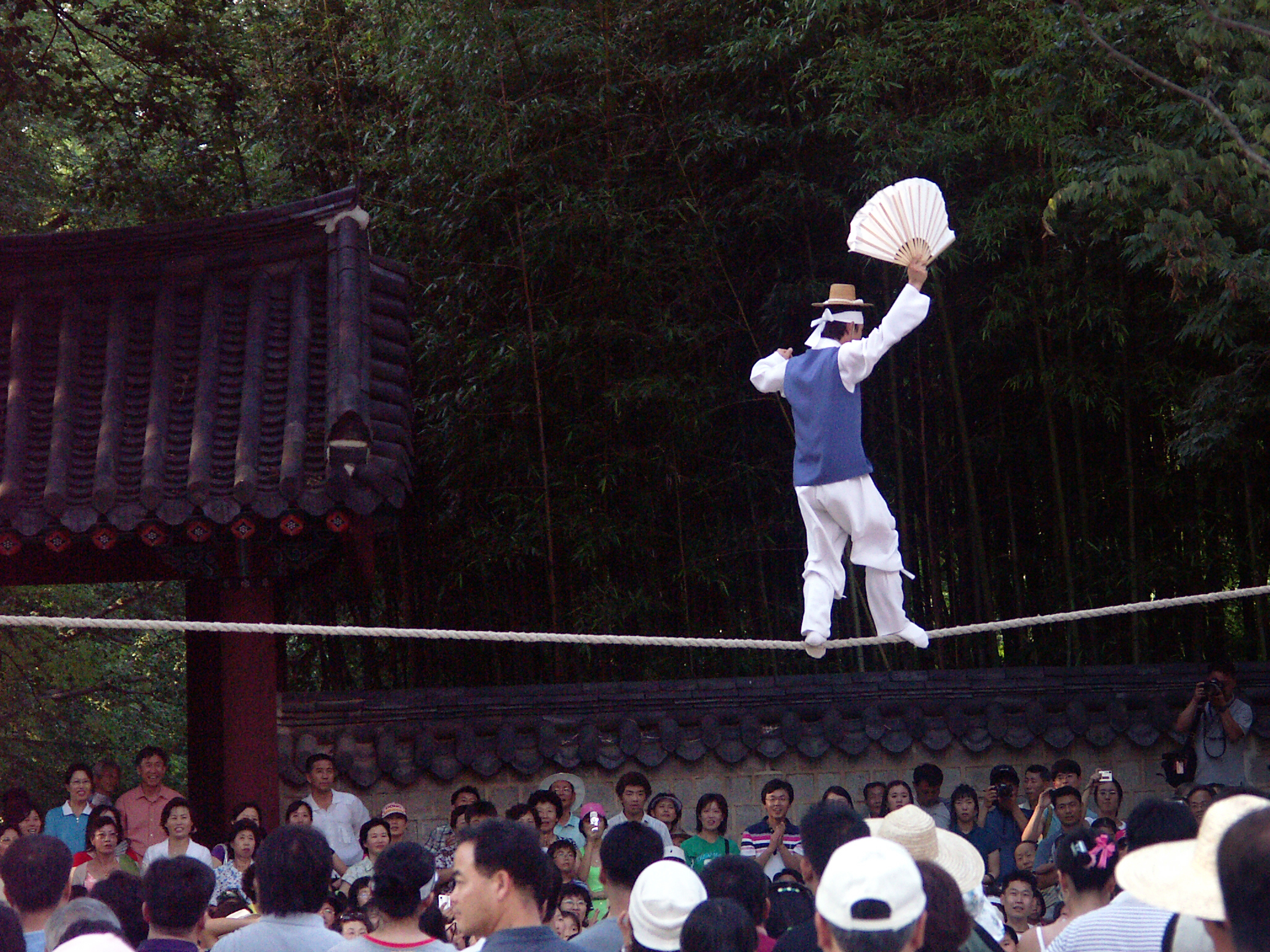
Jultagi, the Korean tradition of tightrope walking

- Charles Blondin, a.k.a. Jean-François Gravelet, crossed the Niagara Falls many times
- Robert Cadman, early 18th-century British highwire walker and ropeslider
- Jay Cochrane, Canadian, set multiple records for skywalking, including The Great China Skywalk in Qutang Gorge, China, 639-metre-long (2,098 ft), 410-metre-high (1,340 ft) from one cliff wall to the opposite side above the Yangtze River; the longest blindfolded skywalk, 800-foot-long (240 m), 300-foot-high (91 m) in 1998, between the towers of the Flamingo Hilton in Las Vegas, Nevada, and broadcast on FOX Network's Guinness World Records Primetime on Tuesday, February 23, 1999; In 2001, he became the first person to perform a skywalk in Niagara Falls, Canada, in more than a hundred years. His final performances took place during Skywalk 2012 with a world record submission of 11.81 miles (19.01 km) in cumulative distance skywalking from the Skylon Tower at a height of 520 feet (160 m) traversing the 1,300 feet (400 m) highwire to the pinnacle of the Hilton Fallsview Hotel at 581 feet (177 m).
- Con Colleano, Australian, "the Wizard of the Wire"
- David Dimitri, Swiss highwire walker
- Pablo Fanque, 19th-century British tightrope walker and "rope dancer", among other talents, although best known as the first black circus owner in Britain, and for his mention in the Beatles song, "Being for the Benefit of Mr. Kite!"
- The Great Farini, a.k.a. Willie Hunt, crossed the Niagara Falls many times
- Farrell Hettig, American highwire walker, started as a Wallenda team member, once held record for steepest incline for a wire walk he completed in 1981
- Henry Johnson (1806–1910), British tightrope walker with Sanger's and Hughes' circuses (also equestrian gymnast and acrobat)
- Denis Josselin, a French tightrope walker, completed on 6 April 2014 a walk over the river Seine in Paris. It took him 30 minutes to walk over 150 m (490 feet) of rope, 25 m (82 feet) meters above the river. He covered his eyes halfway through without harness or safety net but police boats were on hand in case he fell.
- Jade Kindar-Martin and Didier Pasquette, an American-French highwire duo, most notable for their world-record setting skywalk over the River Thames in London
- Henri L'Estrange, 19th-century Australian; first person to tightrope walk across Sydney harbour and early balloonist
- Elvira Madigan, Danish 19th-century tightwire walker
- Bird Millman, American star of Ringling Brothers & Barnum and Bailey Circus
- Fyodor Molodtsov (1855–1919), a Russian rope walker. Was known to perform numerous tricks such as rope walking while shooting, carrying another person, wearing stilts, dancing, and even being unbalanced by pyrotechnical explosions. Known to have defeated Blondin during a tightrope crossing of the Neva river, by braving it at a wider place.
- Jorge Ojeda-Guzman, Ecuadorian highwire walker, set The Guinness Book of World Records, Tightrope Endurance Record, for living 205 days on the wire, from January 1 to July 25, 1993 in Orlando, Florida.
- Rudy Omankowski Jr., French-Czech highwire walker, holds record for skywalk distance
- Stephen Peer, after several previous successful crossings, fell to his death at the Niagara Falls in 1887
- Susanna Bokoyni, Hungarian centenarian and circus performer who was listed in Guinness World Records as the longest-lived dwarf on record.
- Philippe Petit, French highwire-walker, famous for his walk between the towers of the World Trade Center in New York City in 1974
- Eskil Rønningsbakken, Norwegian balancing artist whose feats include tightrope walking between hot air balloons in flight
- Maria Spelterini, Italian highwire walker, first woman to cross the Niagara Falls
- Falko Traber, German tightwire walker, walked to the Sugarloaf Mountain in Rio de Janeiro
- Vertelli, British-Australian tightrope walker, nicknamed "the Australian Blondin"
- The Flying Wallendas, famous for their seven- and eight-person pyramid wire-walks
- Karl Wallenda, founder of the Flying Wallendas, died after falling from a wire on March 22, 1978, at age 73, while attempting to cross between the two towers of the Condado Plaza Hotel in San Juan, Puerto Rico.
- Nik Wallenda, great-grandson of Karl, second person to walk from the United States to Canada over the Horseshoe Falls at the Niagara Falls on June 15, 2012; with his mother Delilah (Karl's granddaughter), completed his great-grandfather's final attempt between the two towers of the Condado Plaza Hotelon June 4, 2011. On June 23, 2013, he successfully walked over a gorge in the area of the Grand Canyon. On November 2, 2014, he crossed over the Chicago River from the west tower of Marina City to the Leo Burnett building, following it with a blindfolded trip from the west tower to the east tower of Marina City. performed a record-breaking skywalk of 2,000 feet (610 m) at Kings Island on July 4, 2008, breaking Karl Wallenda's record walk
- Adili Wuxor, Chinese (Uyghur), from Xinjiang, performer of the Uyghur tradition of highwire-walking called dawaz; record-holder for highest wire-walk, in 2010 he lived on wire for 60 days, at Beijing's Bird Nest Stadium.
- Maurizio Zavatta, Holder of highest tightrope walk while blindfolded. Set on 16 November 2016 in Wulong, Chongqing (China).

== Metaphorical use ==
The word funambulism, the phrase walking a tightrope, and associated variants also occur in metaphorical contexts not referring to any actual acrobatic acts. For instance, politicians are said to "walk a tightrope" when trying to balance two opposing views with little room for compromise. The idea can also appear in satirical or acidic contexts. Nicholas Taleb uses the concept in his book The Black Swan: "You get respect for doing funambulism or spectator sports [...]." Taleb is criticising scientists who prefer popularism to vigorous research and those who walk a fixed and narrow path rather than explore a large field of empirical study.

== See also ==
- Man Crossing the River, balancing sculpture of tightrope over Brda River in Bydgoszcz, Poland
- Rope-dancing
