= Jardin Pré-Catelan =

Botanic park in the Bois de Boulogne, Paris

Coordinates: 48°51′54″N 2°15′9″E

The Jardin du Pré-Catelan is a botanical garden within the Bois de Boulogne, located in the "Pré Catelan" area.

The garden owes its name to Théophile Catelan, the captain of Louis XVI's hunts. However, legend attributes it to a troubadour named Arnault Catelan, who reportedly lost his life while carrying gifts to Margaret of Provence—who had left Provence to marry Louis IX.

Once a simple meadow that served as a source of stone for paving the avenues of the Bois de Boulogne, it was transformed into a leisure park after the quarries closed.

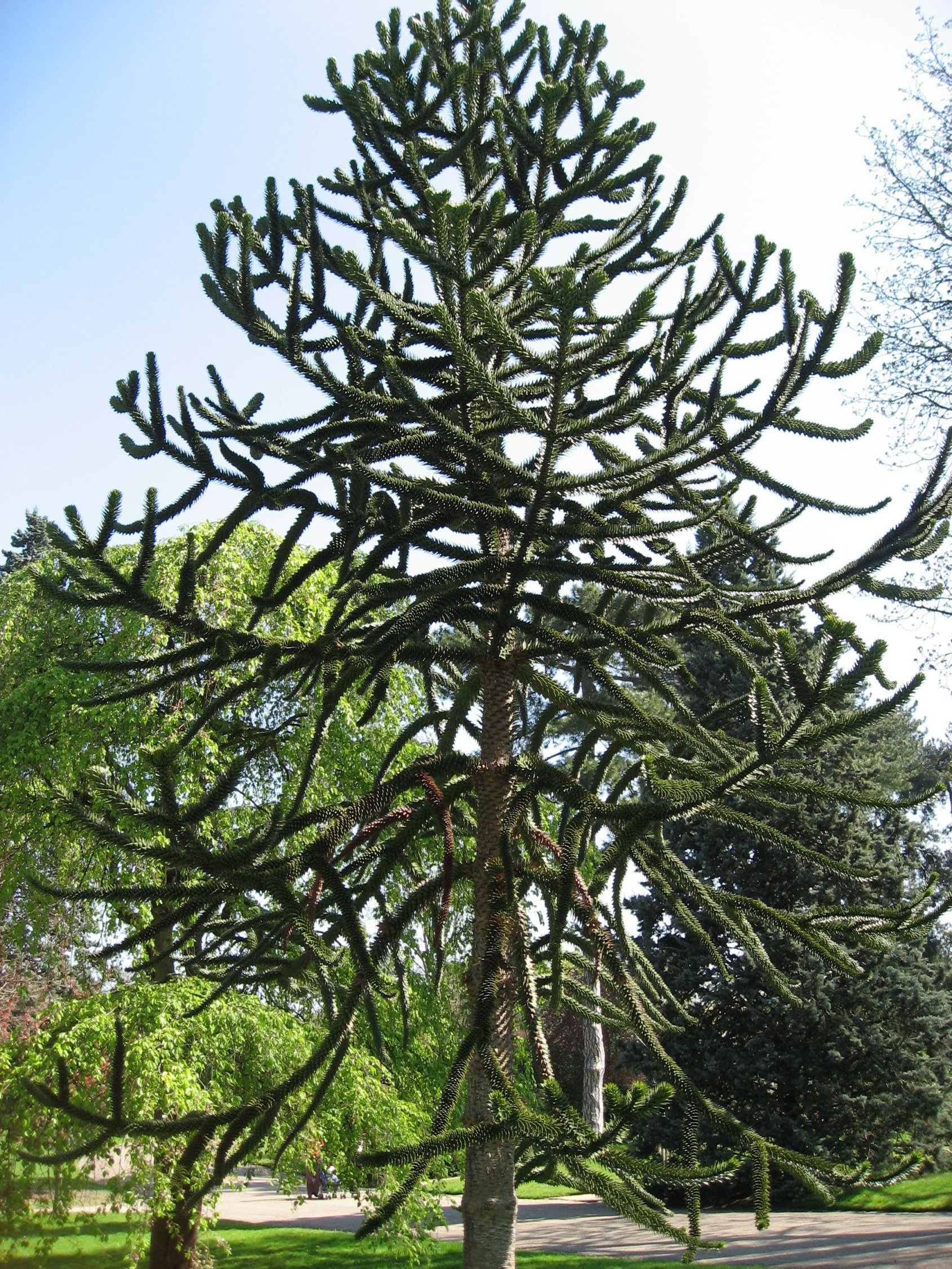
Araucaria de Chile or Desperación de los monos (Araucaria araucana)

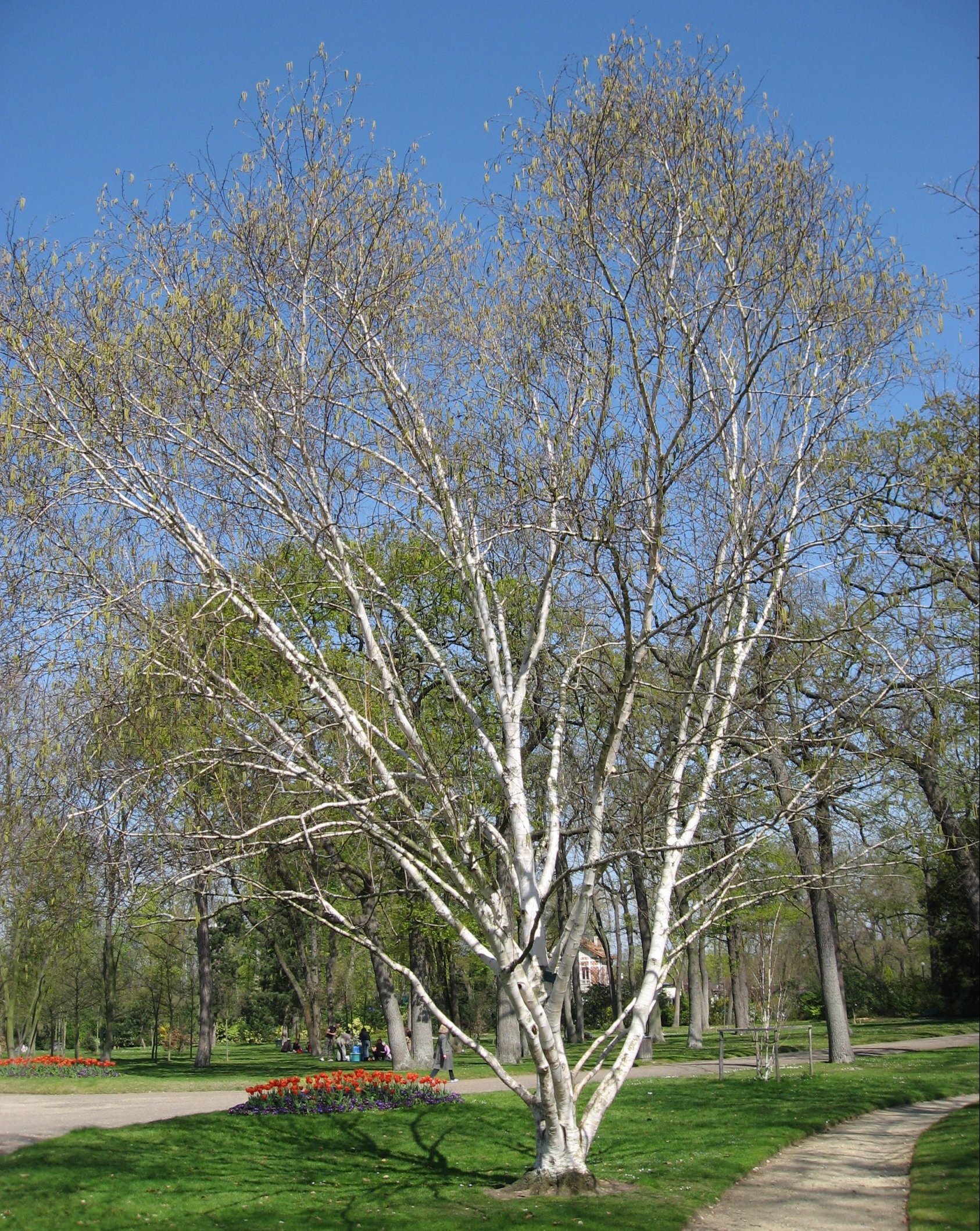
Birch of the Himalayas (Betula utilis)
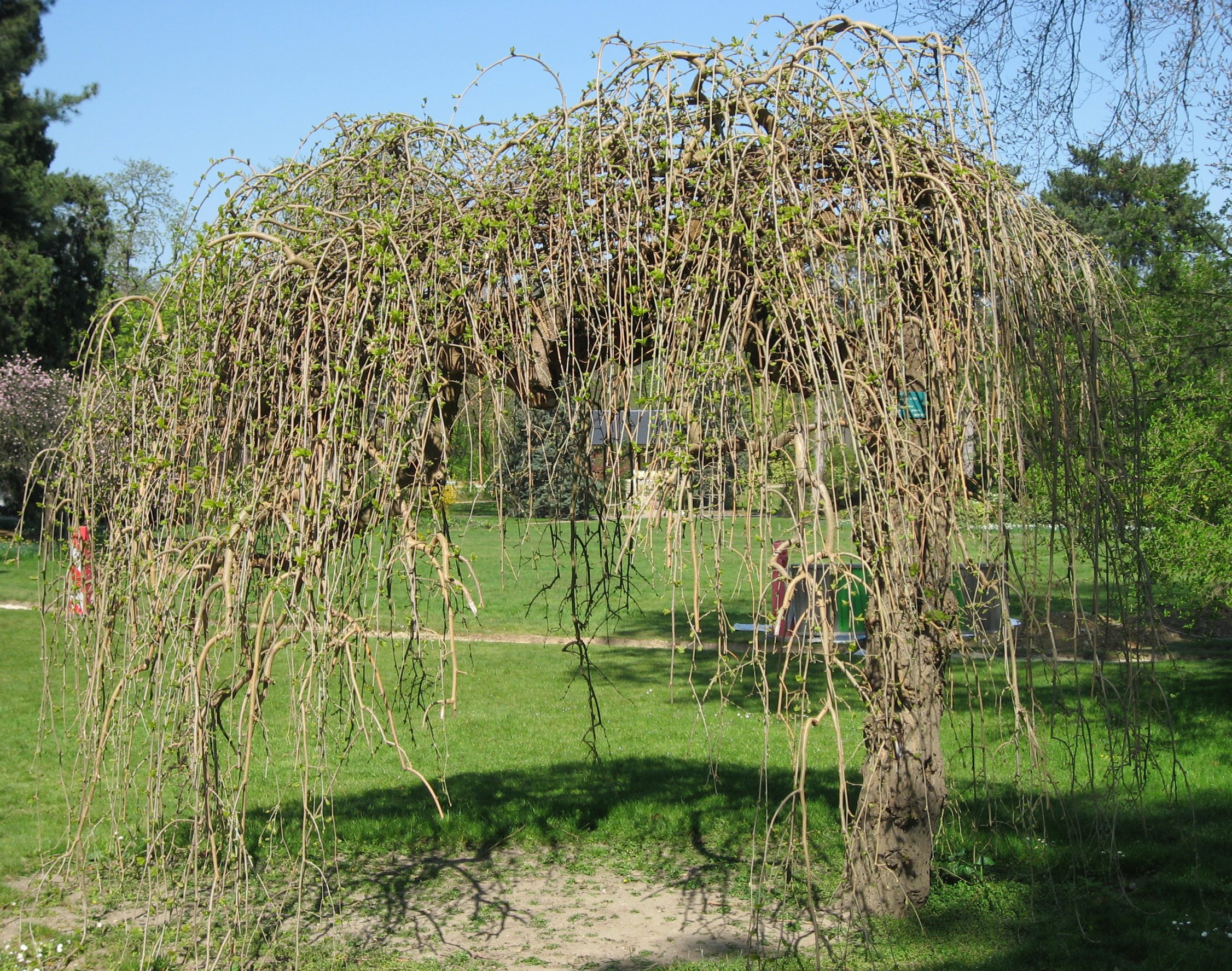
White mulberry (Morus alba)

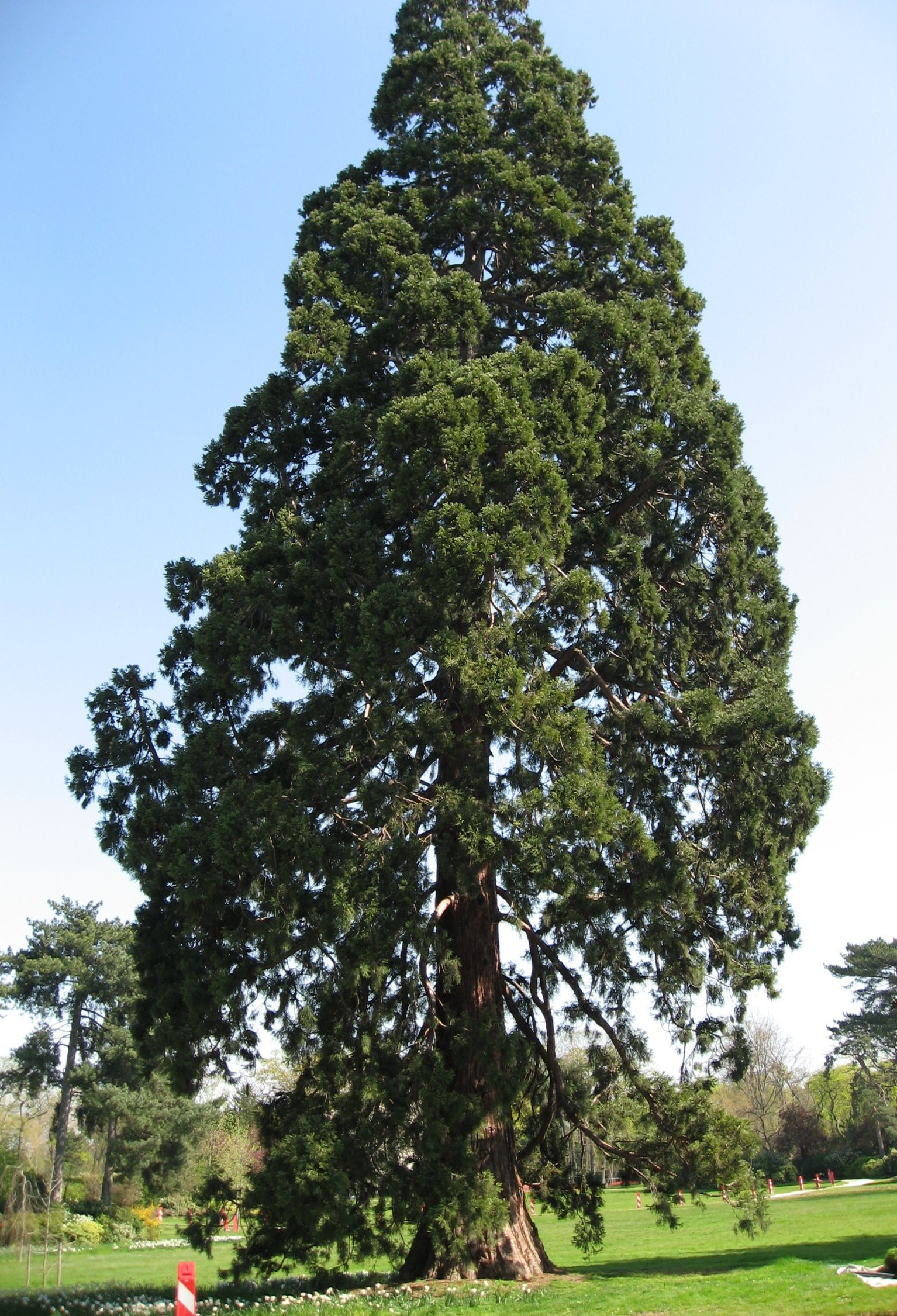
Giant redwood (Sequoiadendron giganteum)

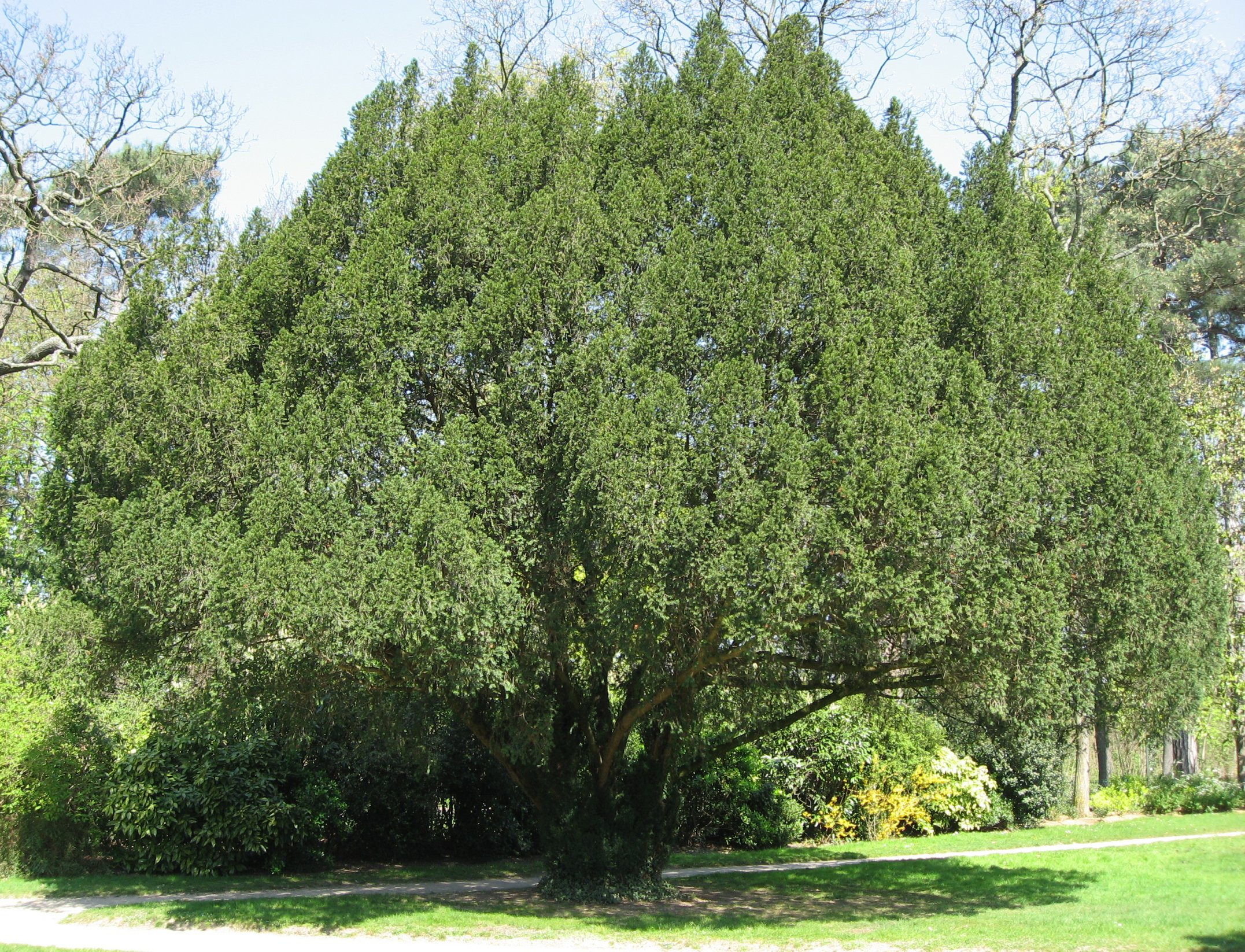
English yew (Taxus baccata)
