= Falko Traber =

French high wire artist

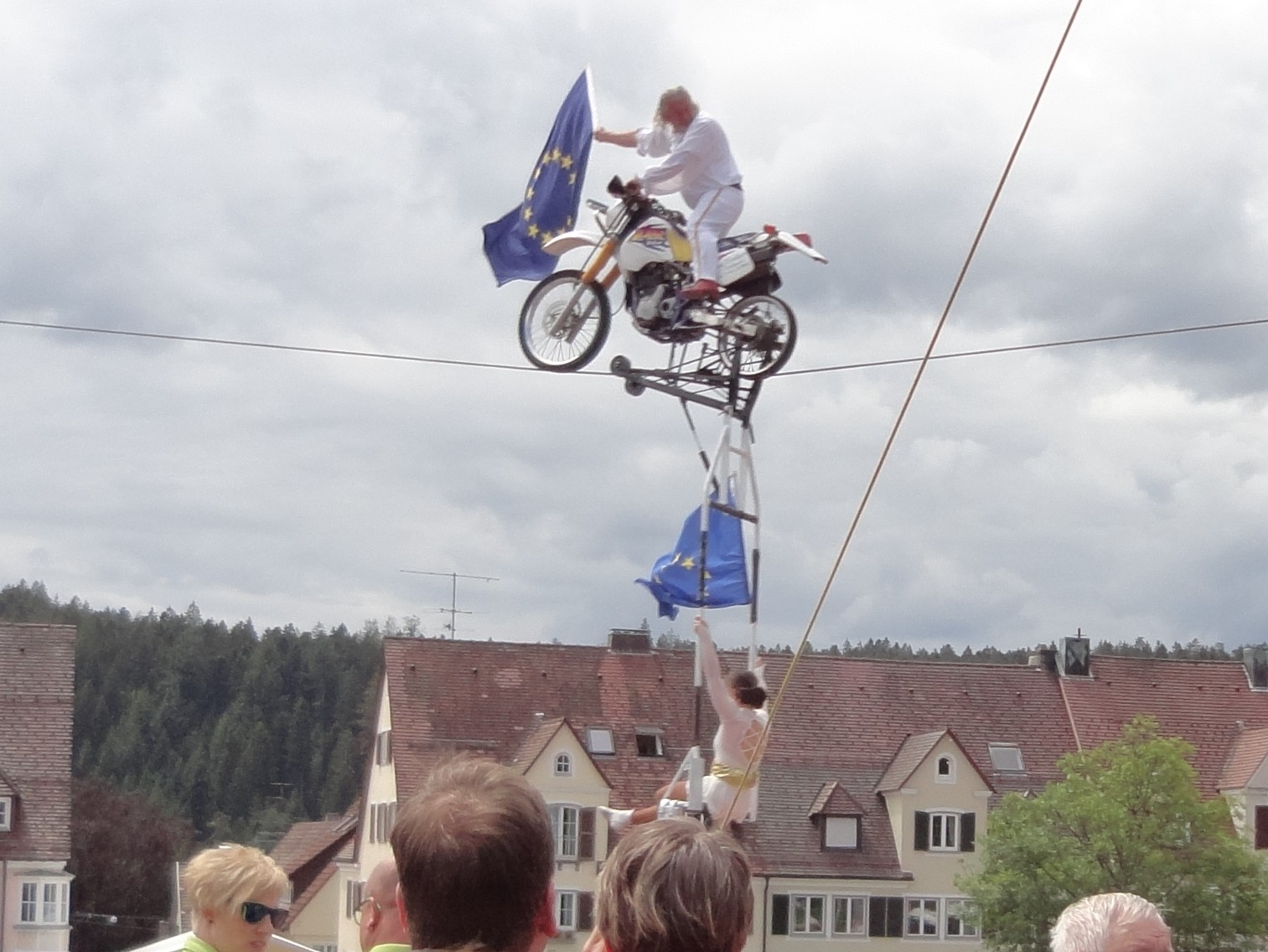
- Born: October 3, 1959 (age 66); Besançon, France
- Occupation: Tightrope walker

Falko Traber (born in Besançon, France, October 13, 1959) is a German high wire artist.

He is a direct descendant of one of the oldest artistic families in Germany, the legendary Zugspitze tightrope artists. The name was given to the Traber family show after their spectacular performance in 1952, after their 2964-meter-high performance on the Zugspitze, the highest mountain in Germany. Born during a tour in France, Falko Traber traveled with his family to more than forty countries. Falko Traber is the last of his brothers to still perform the high wire; his brother Charlie died in 2007 at the age of fifty-four.

Traber made the profession of high-wire artist his calling, and set a large number of world records. An exhibit devoted to Traber and his career has been on display in the National Museum in Karlsruhe for several years.

== World records ==
- 1978: Spent ten days and ten nights (264 hours) continuously on a high wire in Düsseldorf
- 1982: Spent eleven days and nights in Alstertal Shopping Center
- 1996: Crossed the town of Baden-Baden on a 640-meter-long and up to 60-meter-high wire rope
- 1997: Set another length world record in Weil am Rhein, crossing 700 meters of rope on the rear wheel of his specially made Suzuki motorcycle at an altitude of 80 meters
- 1999: Re-enacted the feat of his ancestors as a culmination of his previous work, crossing the Zugspitze with a bicycle on a 12 mm wire rope 600 meters high. He also stood on his head on the bicycle's steering fork.
- 2002: Spent thirteen days and nights (312 hours) without interruption on a high wire, at an altitude of about ten meters, under the open sky in a wildlife enclosure in which there were several fully-grown, hungry white tigers
- 2006: Walked on the longest freely hanging ropeway in the world – the 3S-Umlaufbahn in Kitzbuehel at a height of 412 meters

== News ==
On July 16, 2007, Traber appeared in the "Globo", the largest Brazilian daily newspaper, which featured his run on the cable car to Sugarloaf Mountain in Rio de Janeiro.

== TV ==
- Kabel1, life adventure, July 2007 report
- Aeschbacher Swiss television SF, January 2007, Falko Traber had a guest appearance in an Aeschbacher talk show broadcast
- ORF Vienna by Prima Vera, December 2006
- Pro7 SAM, December 2006, report of the Christmas man on the high wire
- stern TV, October 2006, "walk on the wire rope of the Kitzbüheler 3S-Bahn"
- RTL-Explosiv, 02.11.06 "Falko Traber in 412m height on the rope"
- SAT1-Nachrichten, 02.11.06, "Falko Traber on the ropeway in 412 m in Kitzbühl"
- SWR Night Cafe, 15/09/06, fate parents house
- Discovery Channel Worldwide, 2003, "The best artists of the World"
