= Chad Brook =

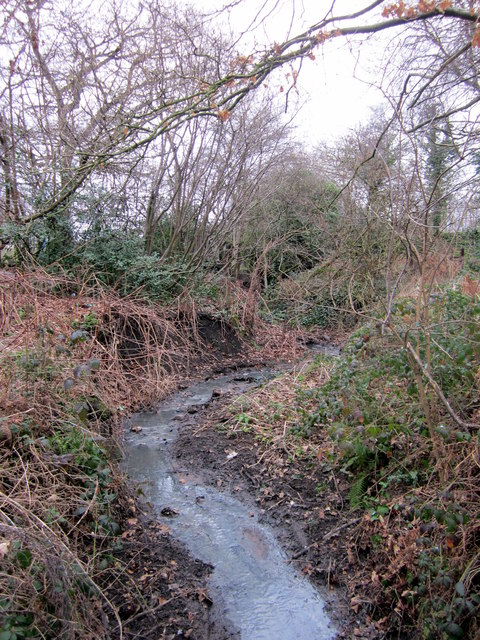
- The Chad in the grounds of Lordswood Boys' School, near its source

Location
- Country: England

Physical characteristics
- Source
  - location: Harborne
- Mouth
  - location: Confluence with Bourne Brook
  - coordinates: 52.4491565°N 1.9157668°W
- Length: 5.3 km (3.3 mi)

Basin features
- Progression: Bourne—Rea—Tame—Trent—Humber—North Sea

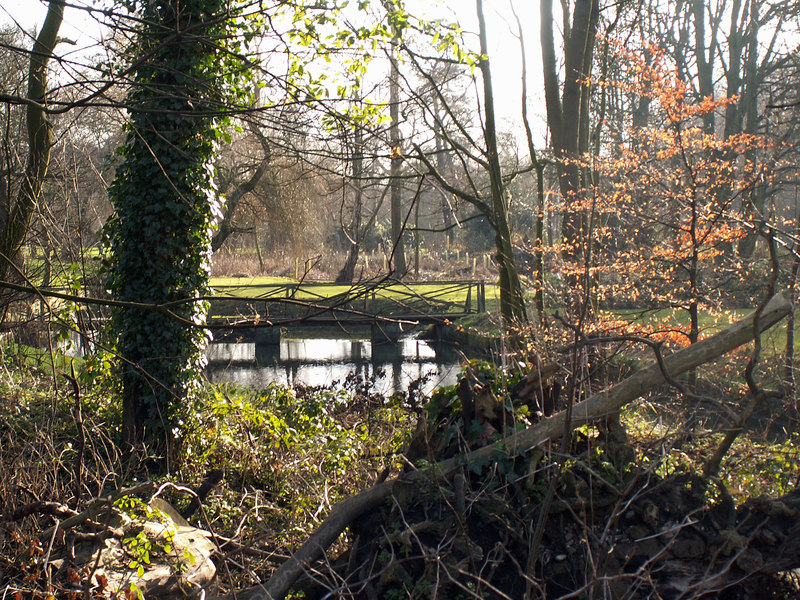
Chad Brook, in the grounds of Edgbaston Hall

The Chad Brook is a stream, or brook, wholly within Birmingham, England. It rises in the district of Harborne (formerly in Worcestershire), giving its name to the area known as Chad Valley (and thus indirectly to Chad Valley toys), and runs through the suburb of Edgbaston.

Its course follows a roughly south-easterly direction, passing through the grounds of Lordswood Boys' School and then Harborne Nature Reserve and the Grade II listed Westbourne Road Town Gardens, underneath the former Harborne Railway (now a walkway), crosses the campus of the University of Birmingham and the grounds of Edgbaston Hall where it feeds Edgbaston Pool, then leading to its confluence with the Bourn Brook. From there, water flows into the Rivers Rea, Tame and Trent, then the Humber, and eventually the North Sea.

At one time, The Chad formed the boundary between the counties of Worcestershire and Staffordshire.

A water mill, called 'Over Mill' operated on the brook from the 16th to 19th centuries. The remains of some of its buildings are extant.

== Etymology ==
The origins of the name are not recorded. It may refer to Chad of Mercia, or be derived from the medieval term shadwell, a 'shallow boundary brook'.
