= Harborne (disambiguation) =

Harborne is an area southwest from Birmingham city centre, England.

Harborne or Harbourne may also refer to:

== Places near Harborne ==
- Harborne (ward)
- Harborne Railway
  - Harborne railway station
- Harborne Reserve

== Surname ==
- Christopher Harborne (born 1962), British-Thai billionaire businessman and technology investor
- Jeffrey Harborne (1928–2002), British botany professor
- John H. Harbourne (1840-1928), English-born American soldier
- William Harborne (c. 1542–1617), English businessman and ambassador to the Ottoman Empire

== Other uses ==
- Harbourne Blue, a goat's cheese produced in Devon
- Harbourne River, a river in Devon, England
- Harbourne Stephen (1916–2001), British flying ace
