= Parks and open spaces in Birmingham =

Green spaces in Birmingham, England

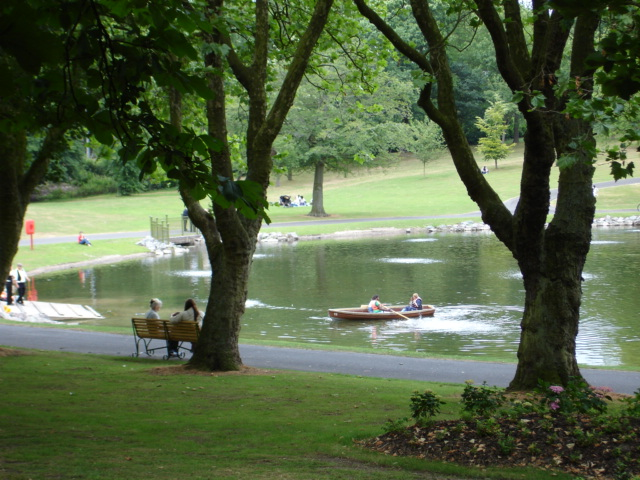
Boats on Handsworth Park pond

Birmingham has 591 parks and open spaces, totalling over 3,500 hectares (14 sq mi), more than any other equivalent sized European city. The centrepieces of Birmingham's park system are the five Premier Parks. Fifteen parks have received the prestigious Green Flag Award. The city also has five local nature reserves, one national nature reserve and a number of Wildlife Trust nature reserves.

One of Birmingham's most popular parks is Cannon Hill Park which covers 250 acres (101 ha) consisting of formal, conservation, woodland and sports areas. Recreational activities at the park include boating, fishing, bowls, tennis, putting and picnic areas. The largest of the parks is Sutton Park covering 2,400 acres (971 ha) making it the largest urban nature reserve in Europe. Birmingham Botanical Gardens are a Victorian creation, with a conservatory and bandstand, close to the city centre. The Winterbourne Botanic Garden, maintained by the University of Birmingham, is also located close to the city centre.

== History of public parks ==
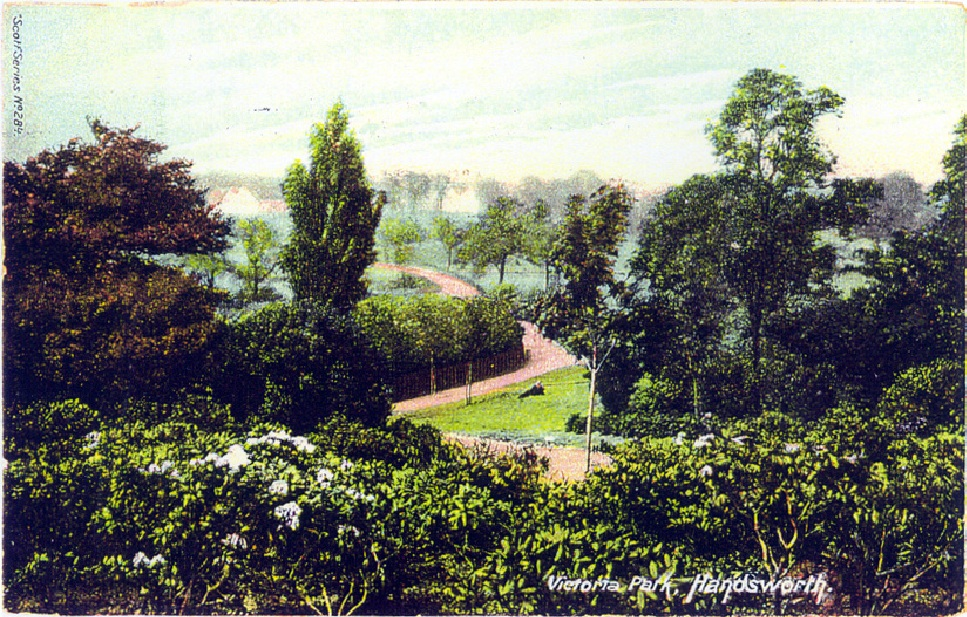
Early postcard of Victoria Park now Handsworth Park

Public parks emerged in the 1830s to improve the health of the working classes living in the over-crowded conditions of the rapidly growing industrial town. It was hoped that parks would reduce disease, crime, and social unrest, as well as providing “green lungs” for the city and areas for recreation.

Most of the land for public parks were either purchased by town councils or donated as gifts. A number of parks were created to commemorate a special occasion, such as the Queen’s Jubilees such as Victoria Park and Queens Park. Even the area around the NEC has free public park areas where wildlife and Lilly ponds thrive

== Destination parks ==
- Cannon Hill Park
- Handsworth Park
- Kings Heath Park
- Lickey Hills
- Sutton Park
- Sheldon Country Park
- Woodgate Valley Country Park

The City's horticultural training facility at King's Heath Park is paired up with Pershore College.

== Nature reserves ==
- Birmingham EcoPark
- Bromwich Wood Local Nature Reserve
- Harborne Nature Reserve
- Hill Hook Local Nature Reserve
- Kings Norton Local Nature Reserve
- Moseley Bog Local Nature Reserve
- Park Hall Nature Reserve
- Plants Brook Local Nature Reserve
- Queslett Local Nature Reserve
- Rubery Cutting Local Nature Reserve
- Sutton Park National Nature Reserve

== Public squares ==
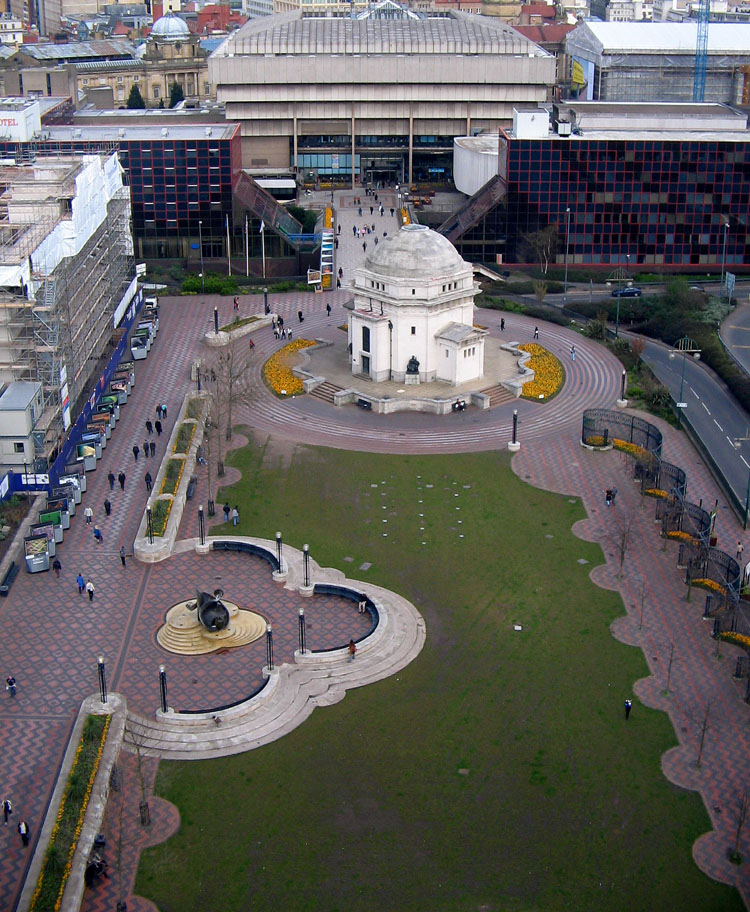
Aerial View of Centenary Square prior to redevelopment

The city centre includes numerous public squares. Among them are Centenary Square, Chamberlain Square and Victoria Square. The historic Old Square is located on Corporation Street. Rotunda Square and St Martin's Square are two of the newest squares in Birmingham, being located within the Bullring Shopping Centre. Brindleyplace also consists of three squares and the National Sea Life Centre.

== Birmingham Parks Strategy ==
On November 27, 2006, Birmingham City Council Cabinet received a comprehensive set of documents describing a Parks Strategy for the city, ambitious in its intention to meet Government priorities, formally marking the end of a long period of neglect of urban parks. At the beginning of a list of objectives the document says the strategy will ensure that "a network of high quality parks and other green spaces are provided for Birmingham's citizens and visitors".
