= Chad Valley =

Chad Valley may refer to:

- Chad Valley (toy brand), a brand of toys in the United Kingdom
- Chad Valley, Birmingham, an area of Birmingham, UK
- Chad Valley (musician), a recording artist from the UK
