= Focus Birmingham =

- Formation: April 2009
- Location: Harborne, Birmingham
- Website: www.focusbirmingham.org.uk

Focus Birmingham is a registered, specialist charity providing support, advice and information to anyone in the Birmingham area affected by sight loss or other disabilities.

== History ==
Focus Birmingham emerged in April 2009, following changes in structure at Birmingham Focus on Blindness. Originally established over 150 years ago as Birmingham Royal Institute for the Blind (BRIB), Birmingham Focus on Blindness became a separate organisation in 1998, providing services to visual impaired people in Birmingham.
