= George Edward Hunt =

George Edward Hunt may refer to:

- George E. Hunt (1896–1959), English cricketer
- George Edward Hunt (jeweller) (1892–1960), Birmingham Arts and Crafts jeweller
