= Anne Chamberlain =

Wife of Neville Chamberlain (1883–1967)

- Chamberlain in 1939
- Born: Anne de Vere Cole; 1 June 1882; Edinburgh, City of Edinburgh, Scotland
- Died: 12 February 1967 (aged 84); Belgravia, Royal Borough of Kensington and Chelsea, Greater London, England
- Resting place: St Peter's Church, Harborne
- Known for: Spouse of the prime minister of the United Kingdom (1937–1940)
- Spouse: Neville Chamberlain (m. 1911; died 1940)
- Children: 2

Anne de Vere Chamberlain (née Cole; 1 June 1882 – 12 February 1967) was the wife of British prime minister Neville Chamberlain. A successful businessman when they married, he credited her with encouraging him into political life, and rising to the premiership.

== Biography ==
Anne de Vere Cole was born on 1 June 1882 to Major William Utting Cole, of West Woodhay House, Berkshire. Her mother, Mary de Vere, was Irish, and traced her descent to the 15th Earl of Oxford; she inherited Issercleran, Craughwell, County Galway, in 1888. Her brother was the noted prankster Horace de Vere Cole (1881–1936), who inherited the family seat some time after 1889; it was later owned by John Huston and then Merv Griffin and is now known as St. Cleran's House. From childhood Anne loved to travel, going abroad each year, later going to Canada and East Africa as a married woman. She married Neville Chamberlain in 1911, and remained his wife until his death in November 1940. They had two children, Dorothy and Frank.

At the time of her marriage her husband, a successful businessman, was already 41 years old and had expected to remain a bachelor. She encouraged and supported his entry into local politics and he was elected to the Birmingham City Council in November 1911. In 1914, just before the outbreak of the Great War, he was made an alderman and the following year was elected Lord Mayor of Birmingham. This marked the beginning of a public career in which Anne Chamberlain was to be Neville's constant companion, helper and trusted colleague, and to share in full his interests in housing and other political and social activities after his election as MP for the Birmingham constituencies of first Ladywood and then Edgbaston.

The couple had many tastes in common: a love of music and art, of books and flowers (while at 10 Downing Street, she created a bright border where previously there had been some sad London shrubs), and especially of the countryside and wildlife. She would accompany him on his outdoor excursions (though not always the whole way, for he was a prodigious walker), and learned much from his collections and studies of Lepidoptera (butterflies), plants and birds.

In literature she preferred Charles Dickens and William Makepeace Thackeray, and especially liked works on history, biography and ancient religious rites. Archaeology was also an enduring interest; one of the attractions of Chequers (the prime minister's country retreat) for her was that it lay on the Icknield Way.

In his biography, Keith Feiling wrote:

Of what he felt of his debt to his wife, he often spoke in public and, as it had been at Ladywood, so he repeats in a letter of 1937 on becoming Prime Minister: "I should never have become P.M. if I hadn't had Annie to help me."

While living in Edgbaston, the Chamberlains had two children: Dorothy Ethel (1911–1994) and Francis Neville (1914–1965), predeceasing his mother by two years. She was a widow for more than 26 years. Anne Chamberlain is interred in St Peter's Church, Harborne.

== In popular culture ==
Anne is referenced in the popular television series Downton Abbey. In the last season, Violet, Dowager Countess of Grantham, informs her son Robert that Anne's godfather was her husband and she hopes that connection will help convince Chamberlain, as Minister of Health, to visit the estate and take her side in a dispute over a local hospital.
