= John Senhouse Goldie-Taubman =

Manx politician (1838–1898)

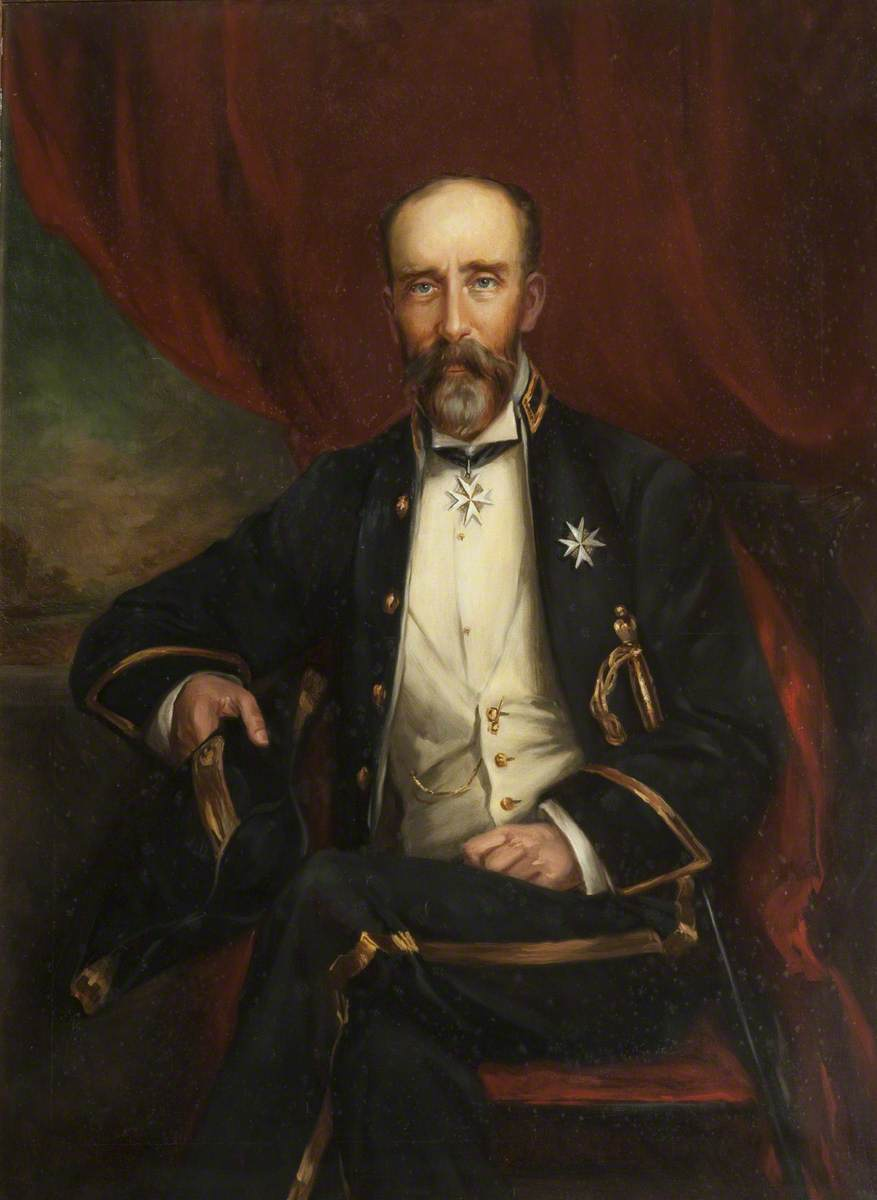
Goldie-Taubman by Alfred Priest

Sir John Senhouse Goldie-Taubman JP (28 January 1838 – 9 November 1898) was a Manx politician.

He was born in London into a prominent family. He followed his father, John Taubman Goldie-Taubman, both into the House of Keys and also as Speaker. He was first elected as a Member by the Keys in 1859 and then elected by the voters of Douglas in 1867, when he was chosen as the new Speaker. He oversaw first the new elected Keys and then its move to the new House of Keys in Douglas in 1874. He became the first Provincial Grand Master of the Isle of Man Freemasons from 1886 to 1898.

He was a half-brother of Sir George Taubman Goldie, who founded the Royal Niger Company.

In 1860, he married Amelia Donald Ankerville Grove-Ross and they had seven children. One of their children, Lady Ellen Margaret Fry OBE, married General Sir William Fry, Governor of the Isle of Man in 1886.

He was knighted on 17 January 1896 by Queen Victoria.

Goldie-Taubman died at Douglas residence, The Nunnery, from pleurisy on 9 November 1898, having been ill for over three weeks.
