= Thomas Baker (artist) =

English painter (1809–1864)

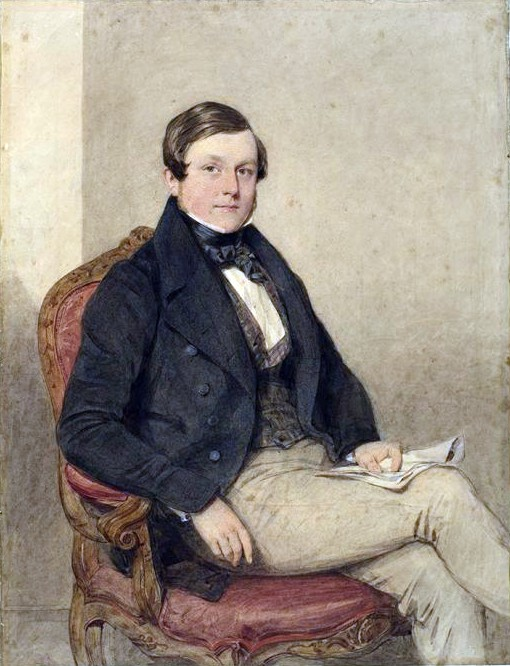
- Thomas Baker (1841) by Octavius Oakley
- Born: 9 October 1809; Harborne, Birmingham, England
- Died: 10 August 1864 (aged 54); Leamington Spa, Warwickshire, England
- Resting place: St. Peter's Church, Harborne, Birmingham
- Known for: Landscape watercolour painter
- Website: www.thomasbakerofleamington.com/

Thomas Baker (9 October 1809 – 10 August 1864) was a Midlands landscape painter and watercolourist often known as "Baker of Leamington" or "Landscape Baker".

== Biography ==
Born in Harborne, Birmingham, Baker was a student of Vincent Barber (1788–1838) at the Barber family's Charles Street Academy in Birmingham. Exhibiting publicly with the Birmingham Society of Artists from 1827 onwards, he painted landscapes throughout Warwickshire, the Midlands and the Welsh border regions and occasionally producing depictions of the Lake District, Scotland and Ireland. More often than not Baker's landscapes include cattle, although sheep and human figures are also fairly common in his works.

Baker kept comprehensive records of his work and usually signed each major picture "T Baker", dated it to the year and numbered it on the back. Smaller pieces, studies and pencil sketches tend to be signed "T.B." (sometimes to be found playfully hidden around gravestones, fenceposts, tree roots etc.) and dated more precisely. His diaries and notes – which contain an 800-strong list of his major works - are held in the Birmingham Museum and Art Gallery while the art gallery at the Royal Pump Rooms in Leamington Spa has a collection of over sixty Baker landscapes, a couple of which are nearly always on display in the Art Gallery. The art historian Alison Plumridge and local historian Charles Lines have both highlighted how Baker provided artistic tutoring to the local middle classes in order to supplement his earnings from major local patrons such as Lord Leigh. In terms of wider success, Baker exhibited four oil paintings at the Royal Academy between 1831 and 1858 with his work appearing more frequently at the British Institution (where he exhibited 19 paintings) and the Royal Birmingham Society of Artists.

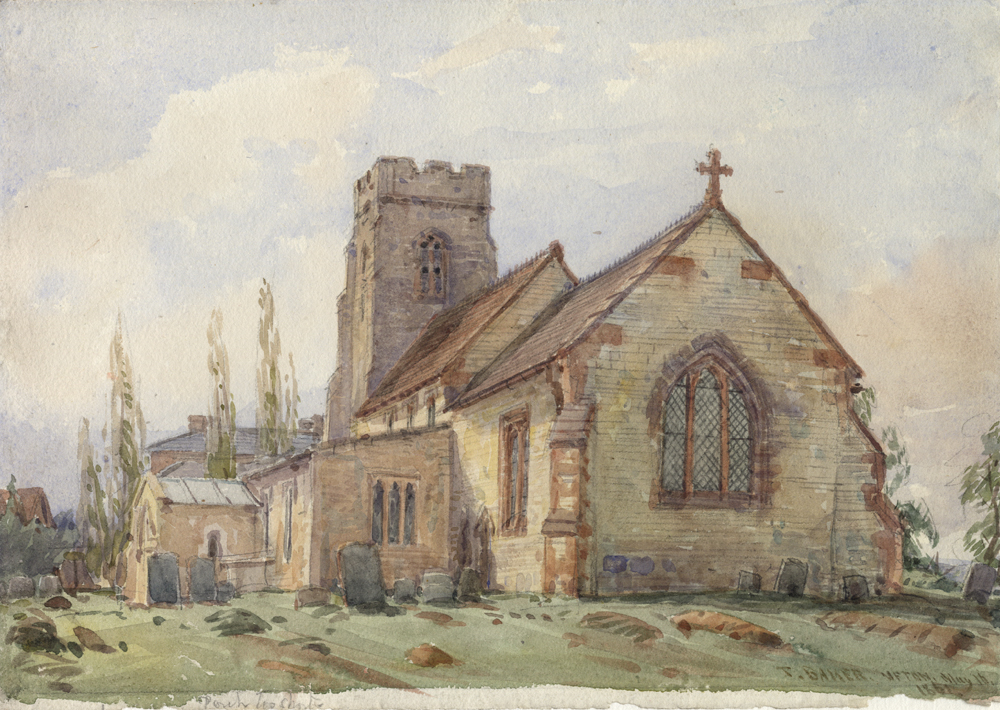
Ufton church by Baker

After his premature death in Leamington Spa, Warwickshire, at the age of 55 (amid suggestions of murder that led to the suicide of his housekeeper, Hannah Hewitt), Baker's body was returned to his birthplace and buried in close proximity to the famous Midlands landscape artist David Cox at St. Peter's Church in Harborne, Birmingham.

The Birmingham-based photographer and landscape painter Edmund Smith-Baker (usually given as E. S. Baker) was the eldest of Baker's five illegitimate children by Elizabeth Alice Smith, a lodging housekeeper from Cubbington. Edmund Smith-Baker ran a studio on Bristol Street in Birmingham together with his younger brother Thomas William, where – alongside the production of carte de visite photographs – he is believed to have completed new and previously unfinished Baker landscapes. Some of these works are signed "E.S. Baker" while others display a rather more decorative signature of "E.S.B" in which the "S" is combined with an enlarged "B".

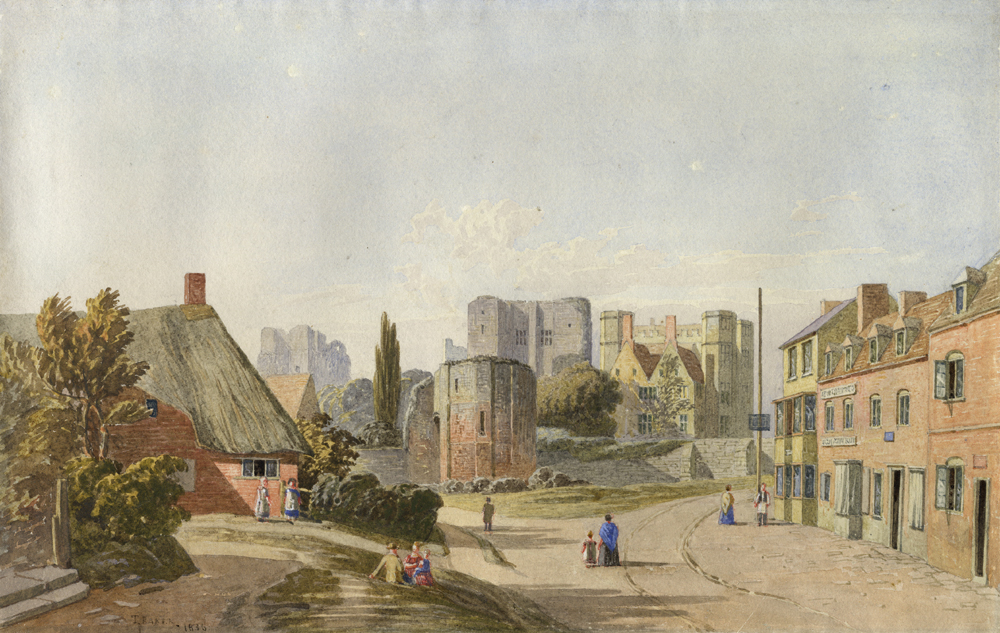
Kenilworth Village and Castle by Baker in 1836

As a last point of interest with regard to Thomas Baker 'of Leamington', Charles Lines has suggested that, prior to his relationship with Elizabeth Alice Smith, the artist had previously been married at either Leamington All-Saints or Lillington Church and produced two legitimate sons. However, there is no evidence to support this. This assumption is likely based on the two Smith-Baker sons going by the last name of Baker such as E.S. Baker by Edmund Smith-Baker.

== Sources ==
- Wood, Christopher, Victorian Painters: Vol. 1. The Text, p. 34.
- Census records RG9/2220 of 1861 - Elizabeth Smith 68 Springfield St. Warwick Warwickshire
- The Book of Warwick by Charles Lines Published by Barracuda Books Ltd, Buckingham (1985) ISBN 9780860231042
