= Roger Tonge =

British actor

- Born: Anthony Roger Tonge; 30 January 1946; Birmingham, England
- Died: 26 February 1981 (aged 35); London, England
- Resting place: Lodge Hill Cemetery and Crematorium Birmingham, Metropolitan Borough of Birmingham
- Occupation: Television actor
- Years active: 1964–81

Roger Tonge (30 January 1946 – 26 February 1981) was a British actor.

== Biography ==
Tonge was born Anthony Roger Tonge in Birmingham where he attended Lordswood Technical Grammar School. He was working as an £8-a-week post office clerk and performing in amateur dramatics in the evenings when he landed the role of Sandy Richardson, the son of motel owner Meg (Noele Gordon) in the ATV soap opera Crossroads, which he would portray for 17 years. Tonge won the role by accident. Having dropped in at ATV during his lunch break to enquire about acting parts, a cleaner directed him to a meeting where production manager Margaret French handed him a script and invited him to return for an audition. Reg Watson, the producer, had already interviewed several actors for the part but was unsatisfied; after Tonge's audition, the producer offered him the role.

Crossroads was routinely assailed by TV critics for what they saw as its low quality, and Tonge was one of the members of the cast who was regularly criticised. He was reported as having laughed off the jibes of journalists, by saying: "I'm allergic to criticism".

Tonge's struggle with Hodgkin's Disease impacted his role in the programme. During his tenure in the series, his ill health left him increasingly immobile. To accommodate his disability and not lose an original character, a story was developed in which Sandy became paralysed and a wheelchair user through an accident. Prior to the 'accident' storyline, Tonge had for many months only been seen in seated scenes, standing rigid or lying in bed. Following the accident, the character of Sandy was predominantly a wheelchair user, though he was able to stand and move upright with the aid of crutches. Tonge thus became the first disabled actor in a soap; however, it was something he always played down and his illness was never talked about. In a 1981 interview with Angela Rippon, Tonge claimed that viewers were often astonished to encounter him off-screen and discover he did not use a wheelchair or crutches, despite him having been a wheelchair user for many years. The claim was not challenged on air.

Although he was a regular in the soap opera, Tonge found time to appear on other television programmes, including Z-Cars, Nearest and Dearest and Detective. He was also in the film Catch Me Going Back.

== Death ==
In 1981, after a long fight with Hodgkin lymphoma, Tonge died aged 35. He had caught chicken pox and died of heart failure, his system unable to cope with the infection.

His absence and death were mentioned in an episode of Crossroads between his character's mother Meg and sister Jill and again in the episode featuring Meg leaving for a new life on the QE2.
