= Edgbaston Pool =

Lake in Birmingham, England

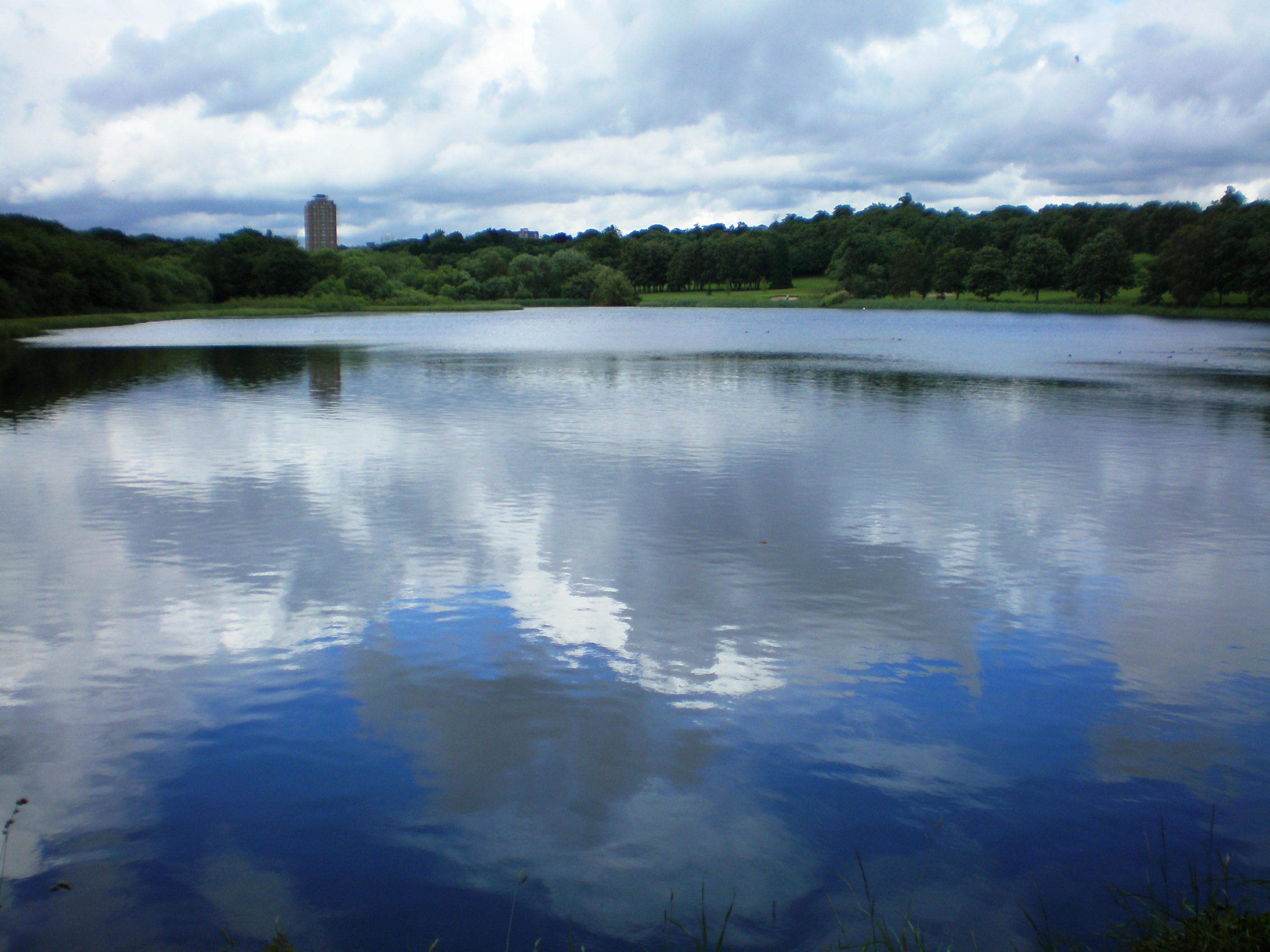

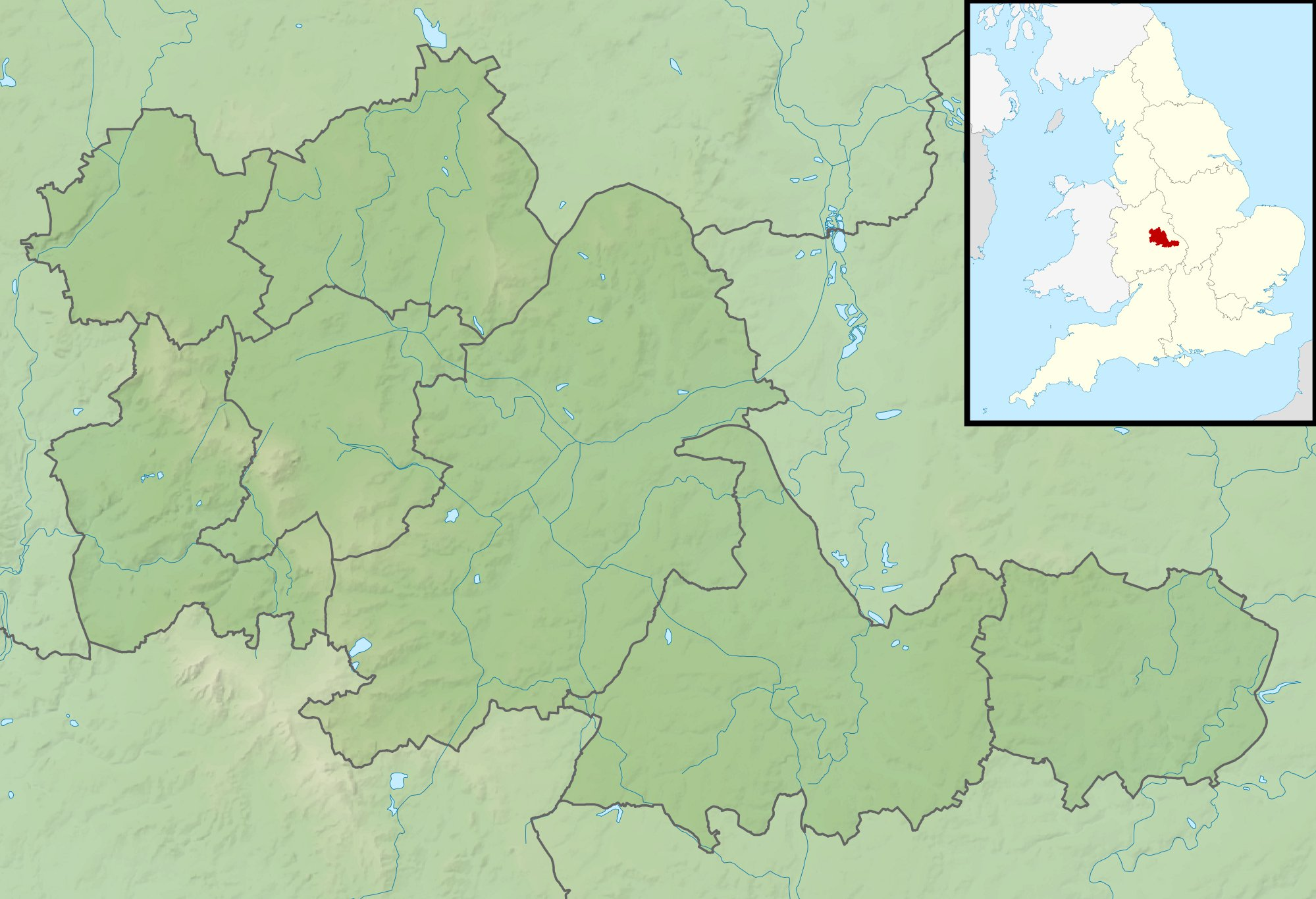
- Location within West Midlands county
- Location: Birmingham, England
- Coordinates: 52.4548°N 1.9211°W
- Surface area: 7 hectares (0.070 km^{2}; 0.027 sq mi)

Edgbaston Pool is a Site of Special Scientific Interest located in Edgbaston, Birmingham, England. It is one of 23 SSSI's in the West Midlands. The site has two distinct units (areas) within it. The first is water-related and contains the 7 hectares (0.070 km^{2}; 0.027 sq mi) lake and the input channel of the Chad Brook as well as some land that is either marsh or lake depending on the season. The second, the smaller section is woodland. In total the site measures 15.93 hectares (0.1593 km^{2}; 0.0615 sq mi).

Also known as Edgbaston Park, the site is based on glacial sands and gravels overlying sandstone from the Late Triassic period. Maps from the 18th century show there used to be two ponds on the site but one has now been naturally filled in and overgrown. On the south side of the main pool, completed in 1790 and whose capacity is 59,100 m^{3} (77,300 cu yd), is an earthfill dam holding the water in and a small weir. The site is adjacent to Winterbourne Botanic Garden and Edgbaston Golf Course and close to the University of Birmingham. Access can be gained when visiting Winterbourne Botanic Garden - admission charges apply.

The pool's bird life has been recorded since at least the 1860s and has included hooded crow, nightingale, nightjar and hawfinch.

The site, in the grounds of Edgbaston Hall, is part of the Calthorpe Estate, and is included in the leasehold of the Edgbaston Golf Club. The site was managed by a joint committee with members from the Birmingham Natural History Society and the Golf Club, in line with a management plan agreed with Natural England (formerly English Nature). However, in January 2012, the Birmingham Natural History Society announced that, after many years, it was withdrawing from its formal role in the management of the SSSI (whose designation it was instrumental in securing), due to a decline in the number of volunteers able to carry out that role. The site will now be managed by the golf club, under a new 99-year lease, in association with Natural England.

== See also ==
- List of Sites of Special Scientific Interest in the West Midlands
