= Alfred Priest (portraitist) =

British painter (1874–1929)

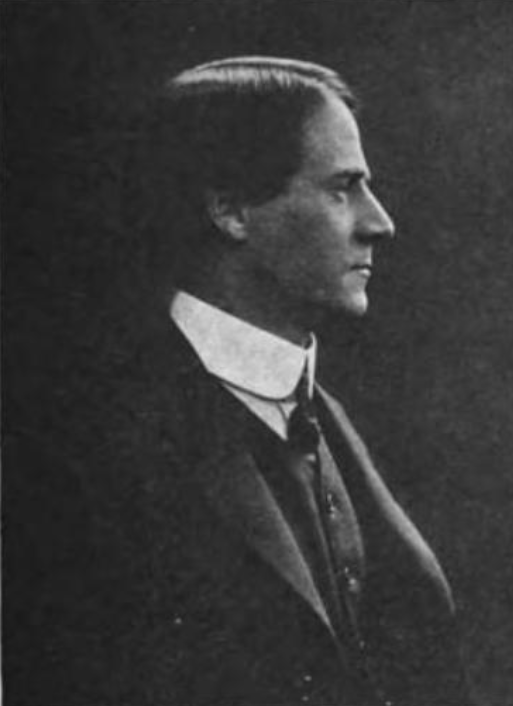
- Born: 5 August 1874; Harborne
- Died: 25 November 1929 (aged 55); 15 Trafalgar Studios, Manresa Road, Chelsea, London
- Known for: Painting (portrait)

Alfred Priest RP (5 August 1874 – 25 November 1929) was a British portrait painter.

== Biography ==
Priest was born in Harborne in the West Midlands. After graduating from public school at King Edward's in nearby Birmingham, he attended Cope and Nicol's art school in Kensington. In 1897, while a student at the Royal Academy Schools, Priest was awarded the Turner Fund gold medal and scholarship. His primary instructors were John S. Sargent, W. Q. Orchardson, Solomon J. Solomon, John William Waterhouse, and George Clausen. He also studied sketching under Sir Frank Short. Later, Priest took up residence in Paris, occasionally studying in the ateliers at the Académie Julian.

In 1904, Priest was employed by the Daily Chronicle as a celebrity sketch artist. In subsequent years, he visited cities in Spain, Holland, Switzerland, and Italy, where he gained inspiration for his landscape paintings. He also visited Australia and India, where his brother was stationed as a major in the Indian Army.

Priest died nine days after suffering a stroke.

== Works ==
Portrait subjects include Max Pemberton, Nawab of Chhatari, Benjamin Stone, Mabel Askew (sister of Claude Askew), Ann Radcliffe, Henry Mitchell of Mitchell's Brewery, and Arthur Henderson, winner of the 1934 Nobel Peace Prize.

Priest also painted landscapes. Two of his paintings, Mother! Mother! and Got 'im., depict soldiers in action during World War I.

His works have been exhibited at the Salon, Sunderland Art Gallery, Royal Academy, and Grafton Galleries, among others.

== Gallery ==
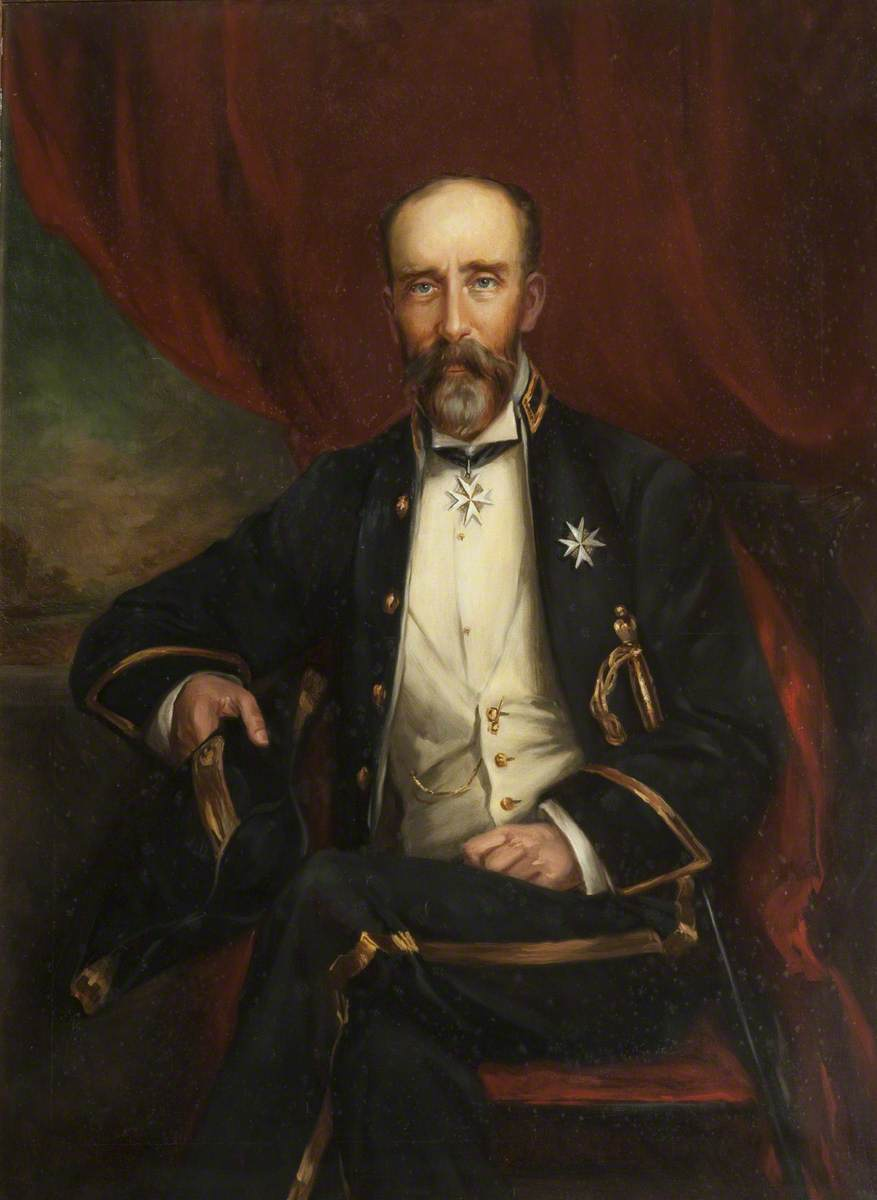
John Senhouse Goldie-Taubman

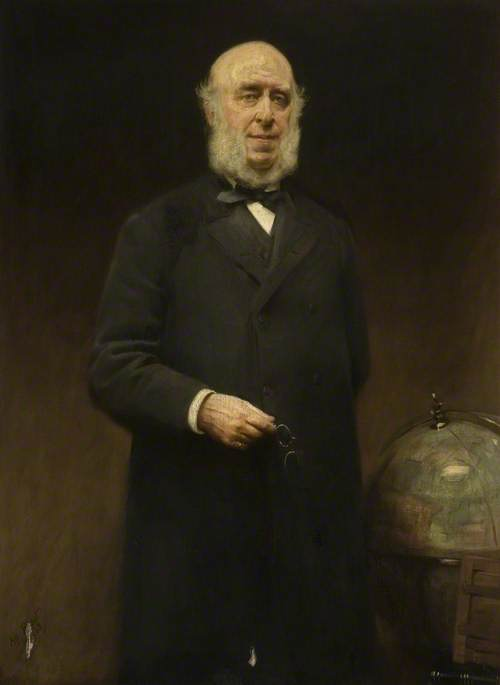
Sir Benjamin Stone (1903)

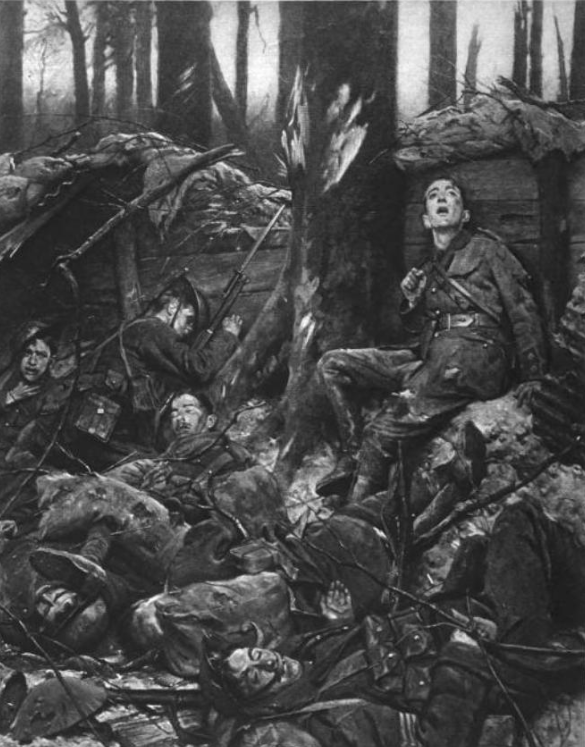
Mother! Mother! (1917)

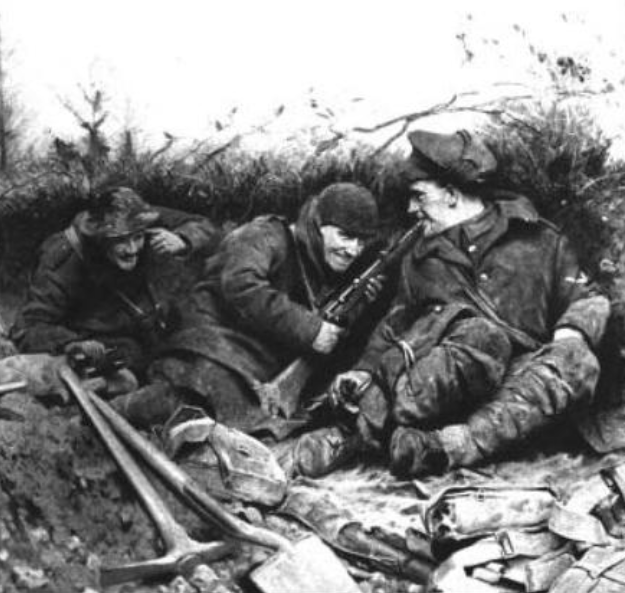
Got 'im. (1918)

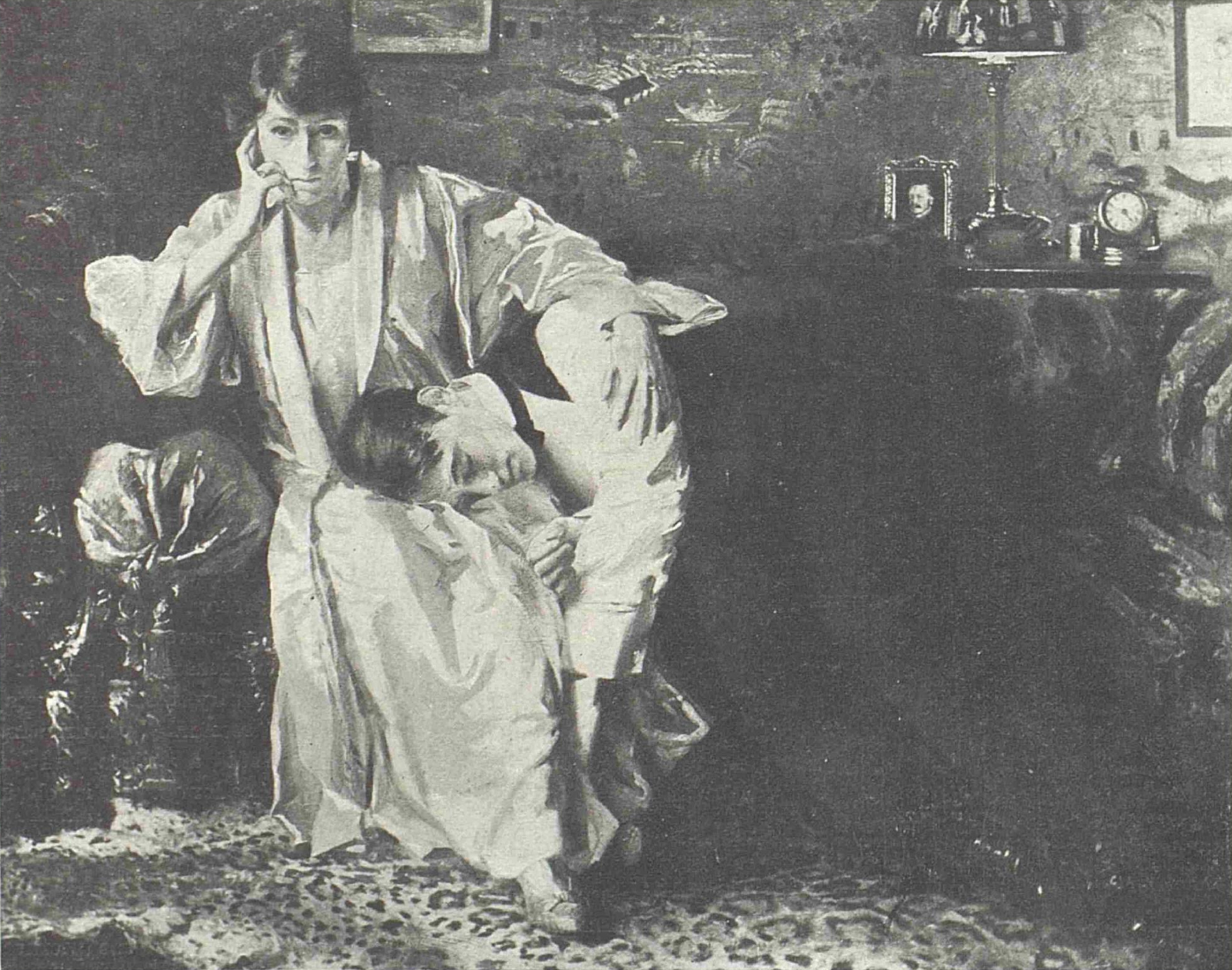
Cocaine (1919)

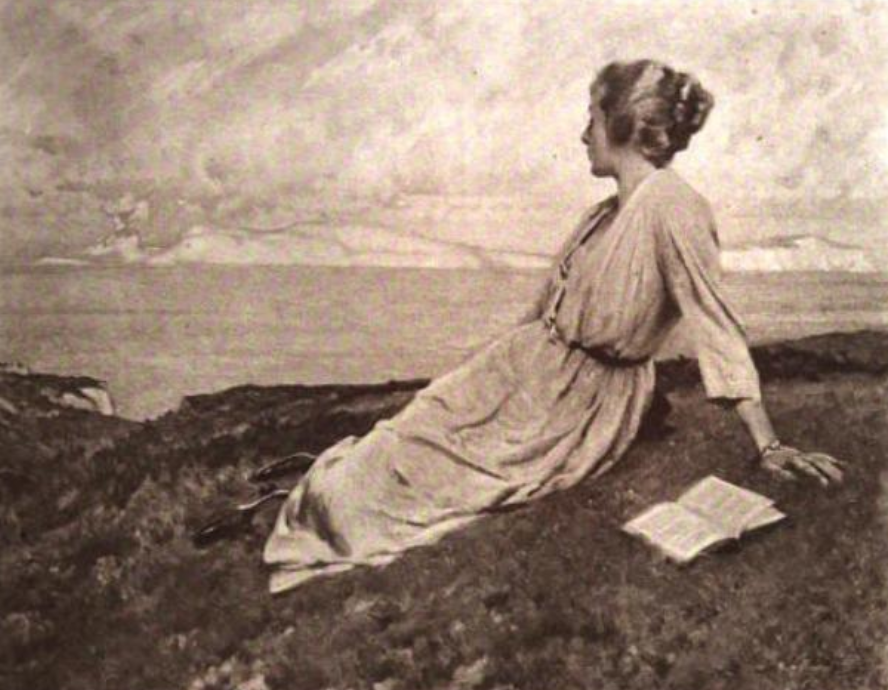
The Old Maid (1921)

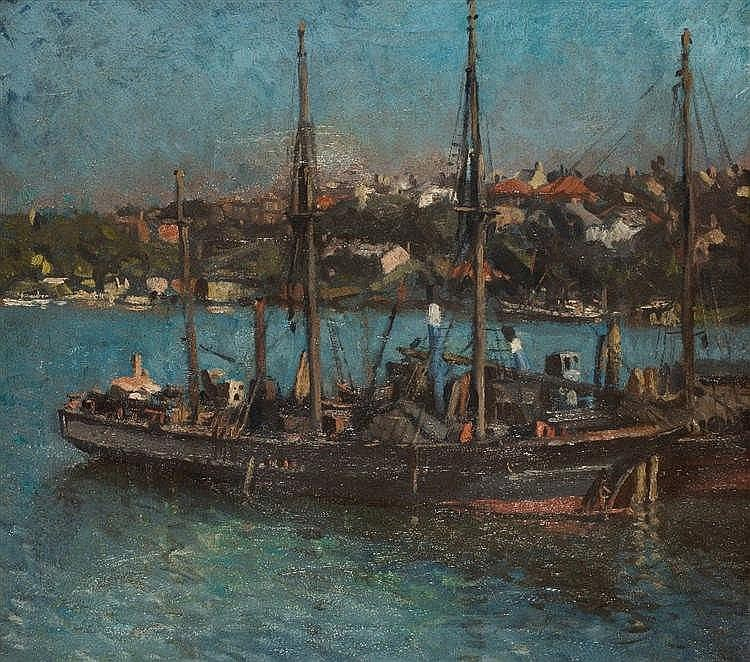
Boats moored in a continental harbour (c. 1923)
