= Chad Valley (toy brand) =

Games and toy manufacturer

- Product type: Toys
- Current owner: Argos (Sainsbury's)
- Website: https://www.argos.co.uk/brands/chad-valley

Chad Valley is a brand of toys in the United Kingdom owned by Sainsbury's via its subsidiary Argos.

== History ==
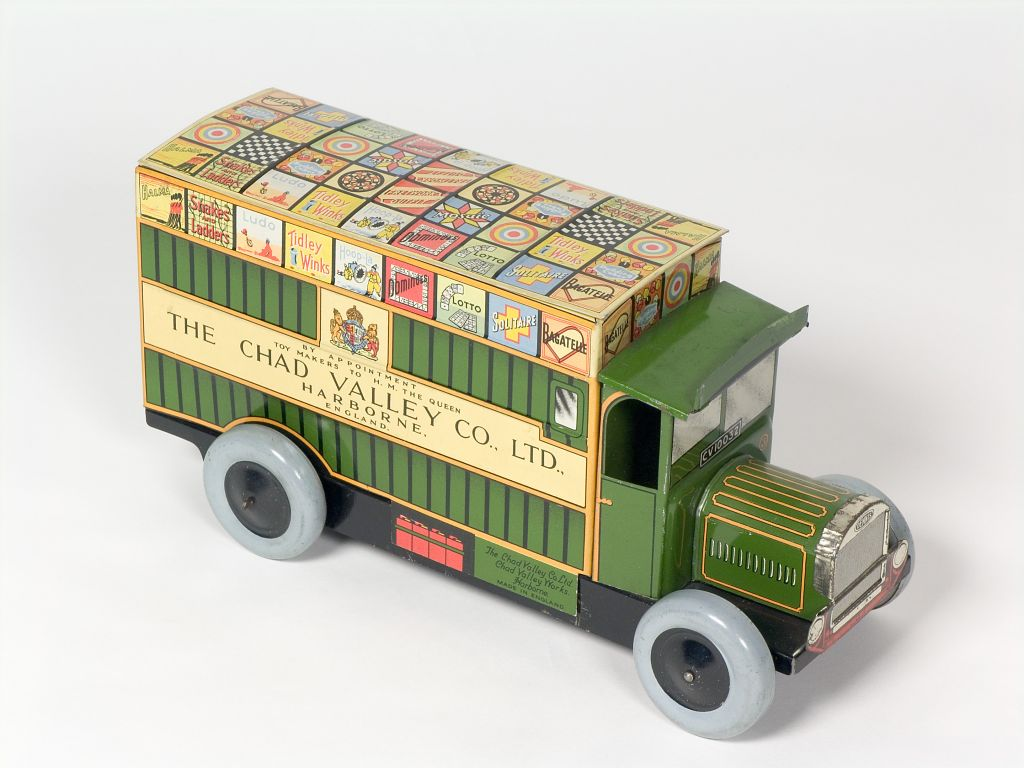
A tin-plate Chad Valley toy truck, displaying their royal warrant.

The company has its roots in a printing business established by Anthony Bunn Johnson in Birmingham in the early 19th century. Under the management of his son Joseph and grandson Alfred, the company moved to the suburb of Harborne, in the valley of a stream called the Chad Brook, giving its name to the Chad Valley district, from which the company name is derived.

Chad Valley made a decision to expand their range to soft toys before World War I. They mass-produced their new Teddy bears in Harborne

In 1938, the company received a royal warrant as 'Toymakers to H.M. The Queen'. When Princess Elizabeth acceded to the throne in 1952 the warrant was changed to read 'Toymakers to H.M. Queen Elizabeth the Queen Mother'.

The company moved away from manufacturing toys in the Second World War. Instead, they produced goods to help the war effort such as wooden instrument cases, cases for the barrels of anti-aircraft guns, hospital beds, and electrical coils and starters.

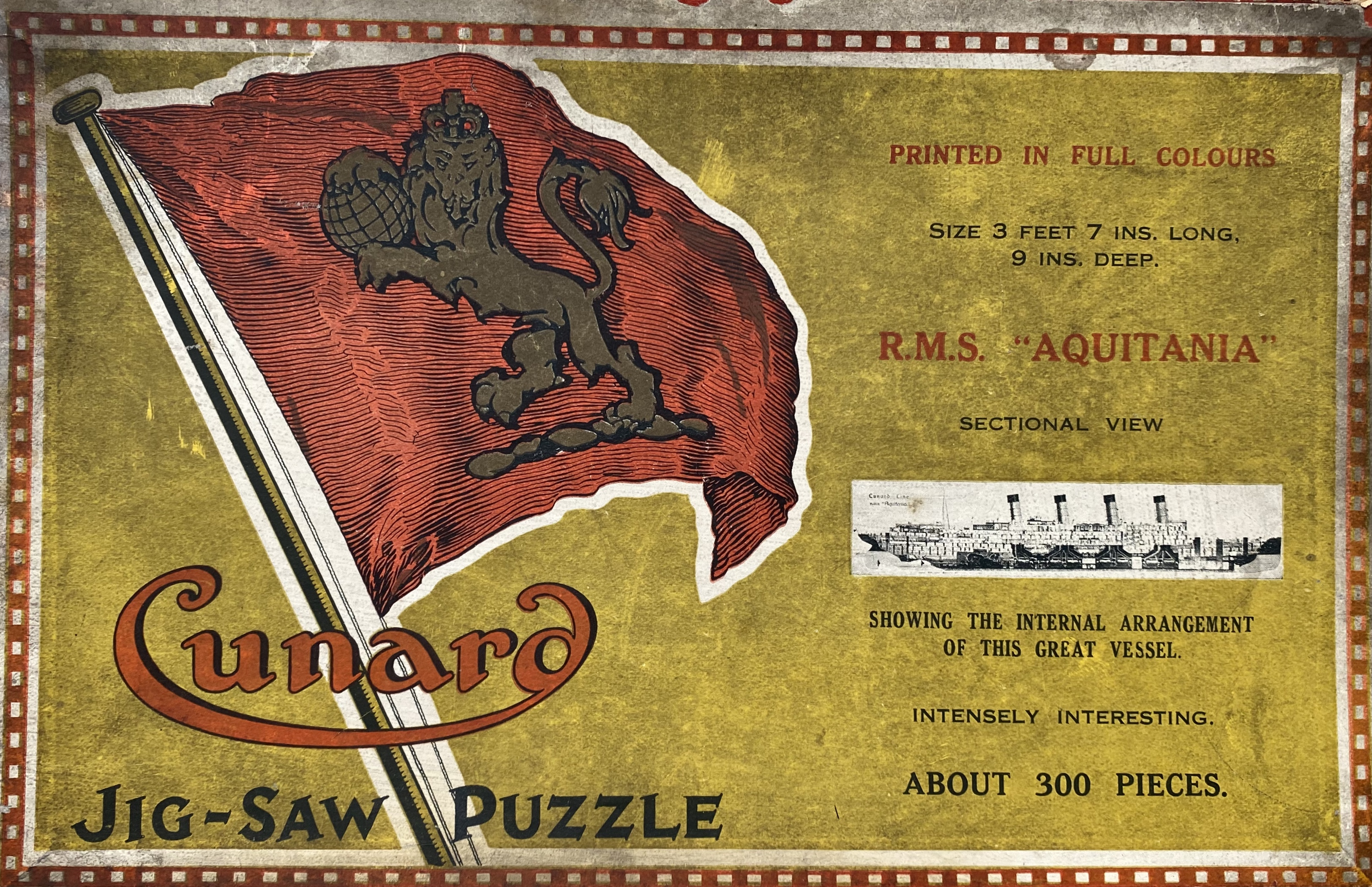
The box cover of a 1930 Jigsaw of Cunard's RMS Aquitania made by the Chad Valley company

In 1945, the company resumed toy production. Tin plate toys were produced for the first time although manufacture was outsourced to Metal Box, a company with the skills and machinery needed to produce printed toys. This new tin plate range was such a success that in 1946, the company moved production in-house. They purchased the Birmingham metalworking company AS Cartwright to cut and fold metal, Winfield to produce clockwork mechanisms, and Barronia Metals and True to Type Products to produce precision engineering equipment.

The radio broadcaster Kenneth Horne was Chairman and Managing Director of the company from 1956 to 1958.

The company was one of the UK's leading toymakers for most of the 20th century; by 1960, it was operating seven factories and employing over 1,000 people. In the 1970s, however, it closed several factories and cuts were made in staffing and production, and 1975 saw only two factories remaining. The company was taken over by Palitoy in 1978.

The brand name was bought by Woolworths in 1988 and remained in use until that company's insolvency in 2009. Home Retail Group, the parent company of retailers Homebase and Argos, purchased the brand for £5 million in January 2009. The Chad Valley brand is now available exclusively at Argos. In March 2016, Sainsbury's bought Home Retail Group for approximately £1.4 billion and Chad Valley became a brand of Sainsbury's.
