= Queens Park, Birmingham =

Park in Harborne, Birmingham, England

Queens Park
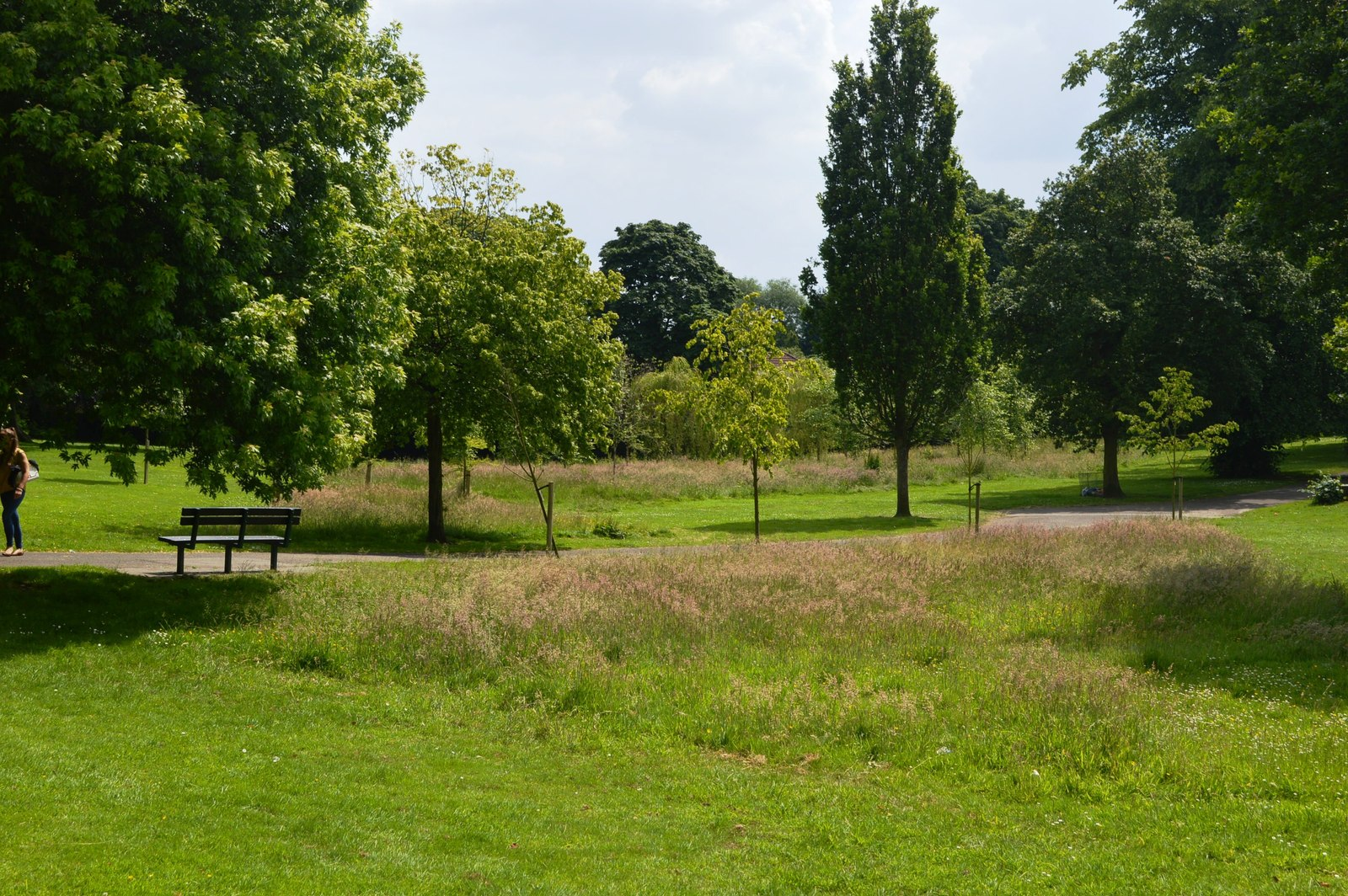
- Interactive map of Queens Park
- Location: Harborne, Birmingham, England
- Coordinates: 52.459°N 1.971°W
- Created: 1898
- Operator: Birmingham City Council

Queens Park was laid out in 1898, after which Turks Lane was renamed Queens Park Road. The 10-acre plot was bought by the Harborne Charity Fete Committee and presented to the city council.

== History ==
In 1898, the park was created in celebration of Queen Victoria's Diamond Jubilee. The Coronation of Queen Elizabeth II in 1953 was marked by the opening of a garden for blind people. This park was chosen because of its proximity to the Birmingham Royal Institution for the Blind college for blind and visually impaired children and adults on Court Oak Road; the college was renamed the Queen Alexandra Technical College for the Blind in 1958. The site of the garden was the grass terrace of Court Oak House adjacent to the park and owned by Birmingham City Council. The garden had raised banks so that people could enjoy the scents of flowers, plants and aromatic shrubs without stooping; a raised pool with a fountain so that people could hear the splashing water; nesting boxes to encourage birds; paths with different textures to give guidance to users; plant labels in braille, and a metal embossed plan showing the layout of the garden. In 1977 to mark the Silver Jubilee of Queen Elizabeth II the garden was restored.

Court Oak House was the residence of Tividale ironmaster Benjamin Round from before 1880. Shortly after his death, the house and its grounds were bought by the city and added to the park in 1906. During World War II, Court Oak House served as the local air raid warden's headquarters. By the 1970s the house was falling into dereliction, but was restored and converted into flats, now owned by a Christian trust for people in need.
