= Queen Alexandra College =

Specialist college in Birmingham, England

Coordinates: 52.4599°N 1.9658°W

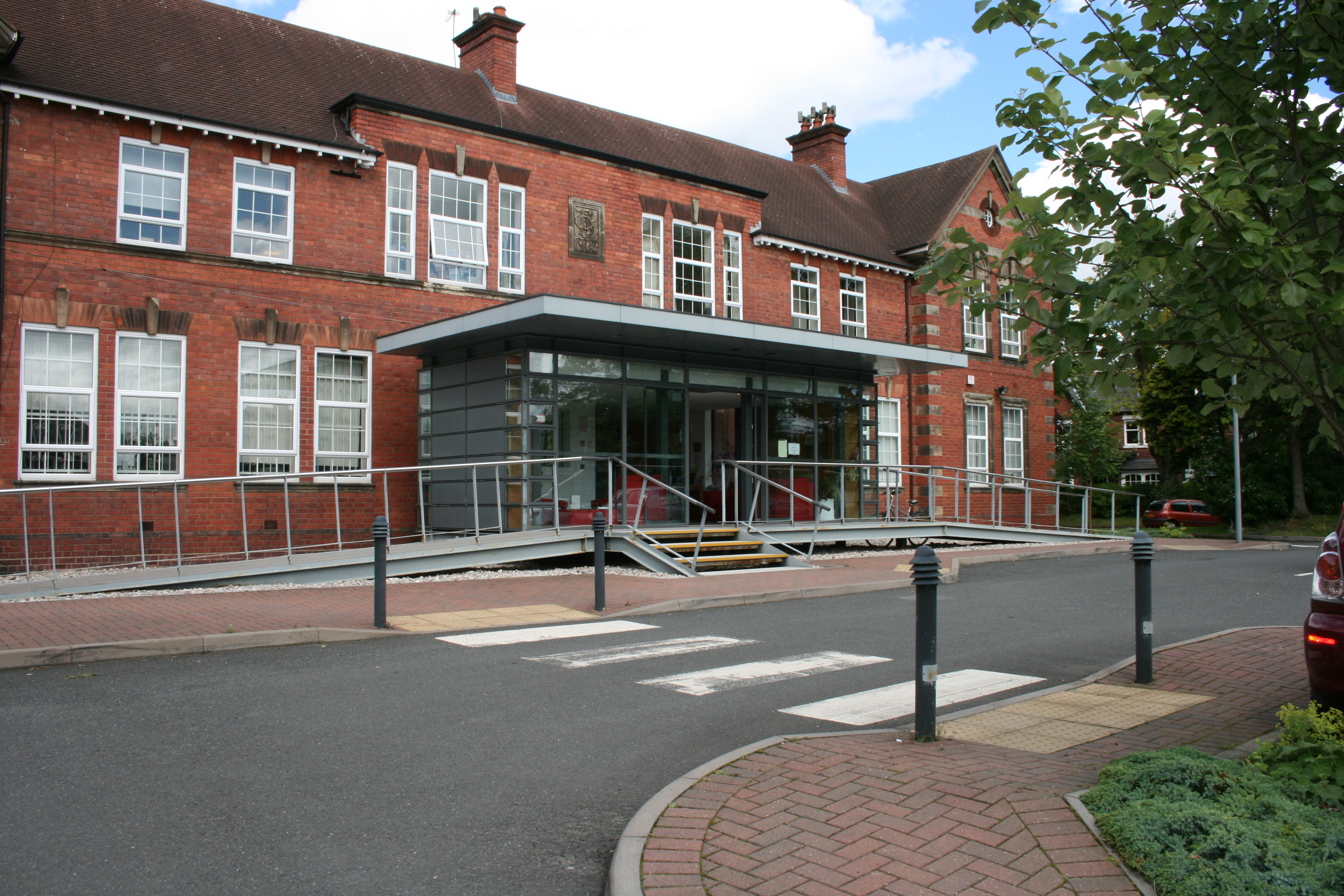

Location
- Court Oak Road; Birmingham, West Midlands, B17 9TG; England

Information
- Type: Further education college
- Established: 1904
- Department for Education URN: 131963 Tables
- Ofsted: Reports
- Principal & CEO: Bev Jessop
- Age: 16 to 25
- Enrolment: 270
- Website: http://www.qac.ac.uk/

Queen Alexandra College (QAC) is an independent specialist college of further education based in Harborne, Birmingham for students above the age of sixteen with visual impairment, autism and other disabilities. Students can develop their academic, social, employment and independent skills through individualised programmes. QAC also offers many leisure activities. Its registered charity number 1065794.

The Bradbury Centre, opened in September 2006, houses a sensory My-Space area, a well equipped Art and Design studio, The Job Shop, Learning Resource Centre, Creative and Media studio and various preparation for life base rooms.

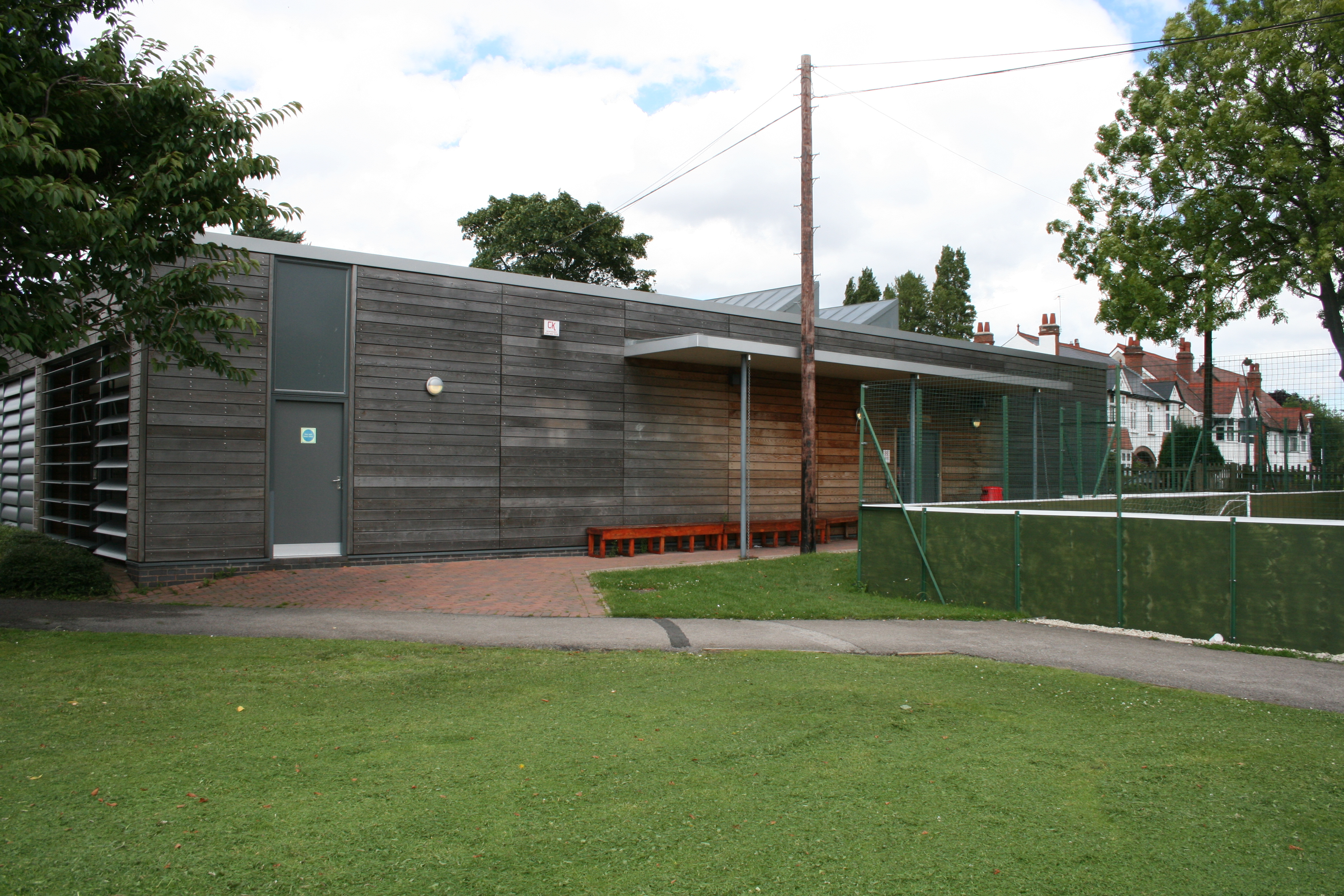
The 'Karten CTEC Centre' of QAC, opened in 2004 where IT training takes place.

The Bradbury Sports Hall, completed in 2014, is a sports facility providing all students access to a broad range of disabled and non-disabled sports. The facility is used at evening and at weekends by the local community for various activities.

== Programmes ==
QAC offers numerous learning programmes.

Programme	Qualifications
Pre-Entry and Entry Level Programmes	Accredited and non-accredited (RARPA) learning programmes in Preparation for Life and Work programmes. Holistic study programmes which may also include a range of therapies to support learning and achievement.
Arts	Qualifications in Art and Design, Performing arts and Creative and Media
Trades and Motor Vehicles	Accredited and non-accredited (RARPA) learning programmes in valeting, car maintenance, woodwork, tiling, basic manufacturing skills, plastering and painting.
Health, Public Services and Care	Qualifications in Health and Social Care
Information and Communication Technologies	Qualifications in IT
Hospitality and Sports	Qualifications in Hospitality and Sport and Active Leisure,
QAC has also offers Supported Internships as a progression route for young people into work - this takes the form of a study programme. QAC was the only specialist college in England to be part of the initial DfE Supported Internship development programme 3 years ago and has continued to offer this programme ever since.

== Activities ==
QAC organises leisure activities outside college time including exercising in the Feelgood Fitness Centre, five-a-side football, soccer training, athletics training and competitions, 'fitsu' (portmanteau of fitness and jujutsu), goalball, swimming club and other related activities, such as ten-pin bowling at Tenpin, Star City, ice skating, pool tournaments and climbing. Other activities it organises include cinema (especially at Cineworld), premiership football matches, concerts (especially at the NIA and the NEC), karaoke, residential visits, outward bound expeditions and music club.

== History ==
Queen Alexandra College grew out of the Birmingham Royal Institution for the Blind. In 1958, the BRIB opened a facility named the Queen Alexandra Technical College for the Blind; this facility eventually became QAC's current campus. In 1997, operation of QAC was transferred from BRIB to an independent charitable company.

== See also ==
- RNIB College, Loughborough
- Royal National College for the Blind
