= Harborne carnival =

Coordinates: 52°27′35″N 1°56′47″W

Harborne Carnival is a street party, held in the suburb Harborne of Birmingham, within England, UK.

Tens of thousands of people attend Harborne carnival on an Annual Basis. Harborne Carnival has been reported as being "the biggest celebration of its type outside London", and as being "one of Britain’s biggest street carnivals – second only to London’s Notting Hill".
