= St Peter's Church, Harborne =

Church in Harborne, England

St. Peter's Church, Harborne
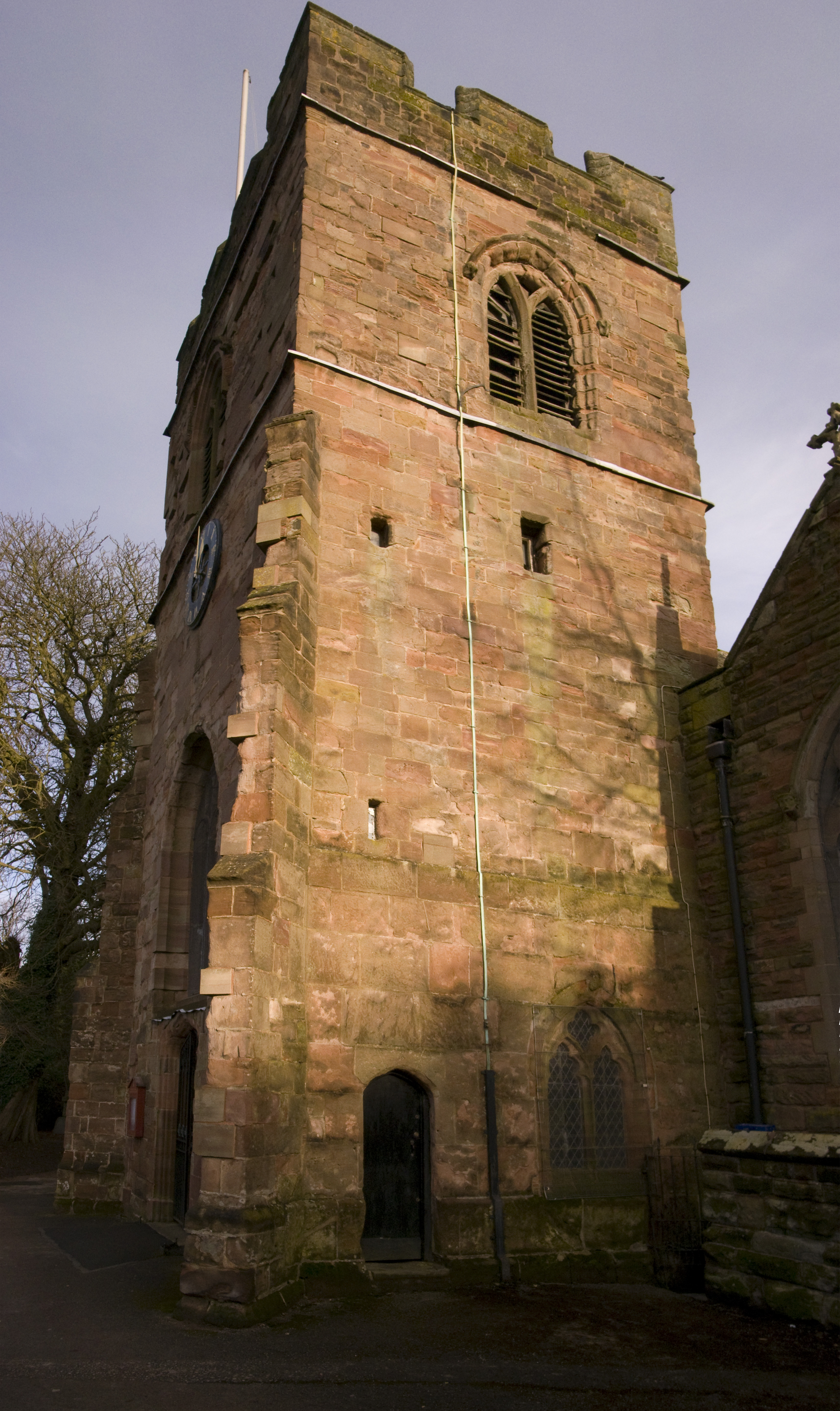
- St. Peter's Church, Harborne
- 52.454326°N 1.958538°W
- Denomination: Church of England
- Churchmanship: Broad Church
- Website: stpeterharborne.org.uk

History
- Dedication: St. Peter

Administration
- Province: Canterbury
- Diocese: Birmingham
- Archdeaconry: Birmingham
- Deanery: Warley and Edgbaston
- Parish: Harborne

Clergy
- Vicar: Rev Can Kate Stowe

Saint Peter's is the ancient parish church of Harborne, Birmingham, England.

== Background ==
There has been a church on the site since Saxon times and St Chad is even thought to have preached there. The base of an early preaching cross was found in the mid-1980s during work at the back of the church. The parish formerly covered what is now Smethwick (North Harborne), all of current Harborne and even parts of Quinton (Ridgeacre).

The present building is Victorian, dating from the 1860s by architect Yeoville Thomason. Elihu Burritt, who was living in Harborne at the time was on the committee that oversaw the restoration. The tower is far older and is all that remains of the medieval church. It is believed to date from the 14th century. The sanctuary was rebuilt during 1974/5 after a fire. It is a Grade II listed building.

== Burials ==
- Bob Brettle, boxer
- David Cox, watercolourist - there is also a sanctuary memorial window to him.
- Thomas Baker, watercolourist. He is buried next to David Cox.
- Anne Chamberlain, wife of Neville Chamberlain, Prime Minister.
- Sir Charles Haughton Rafter KBE KPM , Chief Constable of Birmingham City Police between 1899 and 1935.
- George Edward Hunt, jeweller

There are also 40 war graves of Commonwealth service personnel, 22 from World War I and 18 from World War II.

== List of Vicars ==
Curate - W. Harding (November 1826 – March 1827)

- Rev Thomas Smith 1858-?
- The Ven. Ralph Creed Meredith 1919–1920
- Canon Richardson
- Ven. Sidney Harvie-Clarke, Archdeacon of Birmingham
- Angus Greer McIntyre 1971
- Michael Counsell 1976–1989
- C.J. Evans (Fr.Jo) 1992–2008
- C.S. Ralph 2010–2013
- Graeme Richardson 2014 – September 2019
- Rev Can Kate Stowe 2020 - Present

== Clock ==
A new clock was installed in 1877 which struck the hour and chimed Westminster quarters. It was constructed by Leeson and Sons of Coleshill.

In 1899 the clock was brought to a halt by an infestation of bees. A deposit of honey was attached to the works connected with the south dial. Mr Leeson procured some gunpowder which was fired to silence the bees and then he removed a ½cwt of honey.

== Bells ==
The bells were purchased from the church of Bishop Ryder in Deritend and installed by John Taylor & Co. The ring of eight was dedicated on 2 March 1963. The tenor bell weighs nearly 13 cwt and the ring is in F#.

== Organ ==
The organ dates from 1975, replacing a previous instrument destroyed in a fire. The organ specification was designed by George Miles, the church organist, and can be found on the National Pipe Organ Register.

=== List of organists ===
- Charles P. Heritage 1865 - 1874
- Roland Mellor Winn 1874 - 1904
- Franklyn Mountford 1904 - 1927 (formerly organist at St James’ Church, Handsworth and St. John's Church, Truro)
- W.E. Robinson
- George Miles 1946 - 1988
- Ian Ledsham 1993 - 2000
- Victoria Gravenor 2001 - 2004
- David Friel 2005 – 2023
- Simon Palmer 2024 -
