= Chad Valley, Birmingham =

Area of Birmingham, England

Coordinates: 52.46668°N 1.93789°W

Chad Valley
- Location within the West Midlands
- OS grid reference: SP 043 854
- Metropolitan borough: Birmingham
- Metropolitan county: West Midlands
- Region: West Midlands
- Country: England
- Sovereign state: United Kingdom
- Post town: BIRMINGHAM
- Postcode district: B15
- Dialling code: 0121
- Police: West Midlands
- Fire: West Midlands
- Ambulance: West Midlands
- UK Parliament: Birmingham Edgbaston

Chad Valley is a small area of Birmingham, England, located between Harborne and Edgbaston. It contains a fish pond and the Chad Vale Primary School.

It takes its name from the Chad Brook, a tributary of the River Rea and in turn gave it to the Chad Valley toy company.
