= Lordswood Boys' School =

Coordinates: 52.4720°N 1.9651°W

Location
- Hagley Road; Harborne; Birmingham, West Midlands, B17 8BJ; England

Information
- Type: Academy
- Motto: learn, believe, succeed
- Local authority: Birmingham City Council
- Trust: Central Academies Trust
- Department for Education URN: 145120 Tables
- Ofsted: Reports
- Headteacher: Rajdip Kaur Kang
- Gender: Boys
- Age: 11 to 16
- Enrolment: 368 as of May 2021
- Colours: Yellow and Blue
- Website: http://www.lordswoodboys.co.uk/

Lordswood Boys' School (formerly Lordswood Technical School) is a secondary school for boys located in the Harborne area of Birmingham, in the West Midlands of England.

Opened in September 1957, ten years later it had changed to a grammar school and subsequent years later to a comprehensive school. Every ten years the school has an anniversary party from the year it was built.

Previously a community school administered by Birmingham City Council, Lordswood Boys' School converted to academy status in January 2013 and joined Lordswood Girls' School as part of Lordswood Academies Trust. In July 2017 Lordswood Boys' School left Lordswood Academies Trust after an extended period in Special Measures entered into after being rated Inadequate in multiple Ofsted inspections. and undergoing a severe drop in the number of students enrolled. Of a school capacity of 733, only 356 were enrolled as of 2 December 2016.

Central Academies Trust took on running of the school as of 1 September 2017. With the building outdated, the school was then rebuilt and the original building was demolished.

== Notable former pupils ==
=== Lordswood Technical Grammar School ===
- Roger Tonge, actor

=== Lordswood Boys' School ===
- Mike Gayle, author
- Rico Henry, footballer
