= Birmingham Royal Institution for the Blind =

The Birmingham Royal Institution for the Blind (BRIB) is a registered charity in the United Kingdom which has provided education, technology, guidance and support for Birmingham's visually impaired community for over 150 years.

== History ==
In 1846, founders Elizabeth Bache Harrold and Mary Badger rented a small home in Carpenter Road, Edgbaston which they subsequently opened as a school for the blind, initially with six students. Over the years, the organization grew in size, placing graduates in various roles and positions previously not accessible to the blind. In 1848, the little school was officially named the "Birmingham Institution for the Blind". In 1909, King Edward VII and Queen Alexandra visited the institution, and conferred their royal patronage. At this time, the institution became formally known as "The Birmingham Royal Institution for the Blind".

In 1953, pupils were moved to Lickey Grange. The BRIB kept the house at Lickey Grange much the same, but developed the grounds to accommodate the needs of a residential school. Individual houses were built for teachers, and hostel blocks were built for the pupils. In addition, an assembly hall, indoor swimming pool and classrooms were built.

The school catered for a mixture of residential and day pupils. Until the 1980s, there were more residential pupils than day pupils; however changes in the methods of education, particularly integration, led to a large decline in the numbers of children attending the school. The Lickey Grange school eventually closed in 1990.

Meanwhile, in 1985, the Birmingham Royal Institution for the Blind was incorporated under the laws of Great Britain and assumed all financial and operational activities of the previously unincorporated charity. In 1997, BRIB became ‘parent’ to three independent charities:

- Focus Birmingham provides day-to-day services to the visually impaired and their care givers, including telephone help lines, rehabilitation services, and social services.
- Queen Alexandra College is a specialist, independent residential college for young people with disabilities; specialists in visual impairment and autism.
- New Outlook Housing provides accommodation to the blind and visually impaired.

All three charitable companies continue to receive support from BRIB.
