= George Edward Hunt (jeweller) =

- Born: 2 September 1892; Dudley, England
- Died: 4 December 1960 (aged 68); 10 Bull Street, Harborne
- Resting place: St Peter's Church, Harborne
- Known for: Jewellery design

George Edward Hunt (2 September 1892 – 1960) was a notable British Birmingham-based Arts and Crafts jeweller.

He was born on 2 September 1892 in Dudley, near Birmingham. At the age of five he contracted diphtheria and became deaf. The family left the Black Country and moved to Harborne, a suburb of Birmingham, where Hunt remained until his death in 1960.

In 1908, at the age of sixteen, Hunt won free admission to the Margaret Street Art School in Birmingham, where he was taught by Bernard Cuzner. He was awarded several prizes for both design and metalwork in national competitions.

Hunt opened a shop at Five Ways, near Birmingham city centre. By the 1920s his clientele included aristocracy such as Eileen Sutherland-Leveson-Gower, Duchess of Sutherland, for whom he made a series of enamelled miniatures of her ancestors.

He is buried at St Peter's Church, Harborne, alongside his parents.

An exhibition of his work, The Silent World of an Arts and Crafts Jeweller was held by Bonhams in 2006, at their premises in London, Bath and Knowle, near Birmingham.
