= John H. Harbourne =

American Civil War Medal of Honor recipient

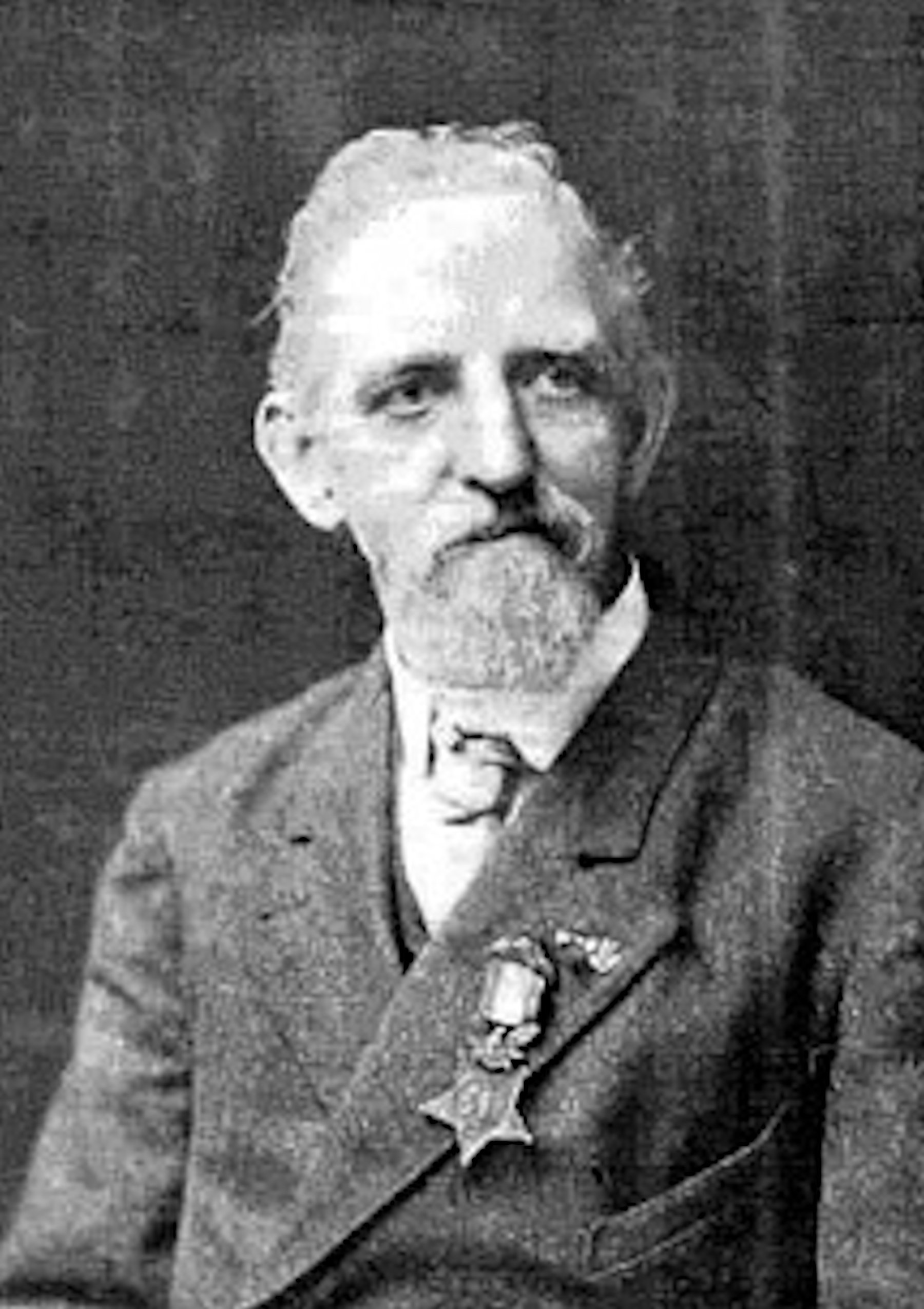
- Harbourne in c. 1913
- Born: September 9, 1840; England
- Died: November 29, 1928 (aged 88)
- Military career
- Allegiance: United States
- Branch: US Army
- Service years: 1864
- Rank: Private
- Unit: 29th Massachusetts Infantry
- Conflicts: Second Battle of Petersburg; American Civil War
- Awards: Medal of Honor

John H. Harbourne (September 9, 1840 - November 29, 1928) was an English born American soldier who fought in the American Civil War. Harbourne received his country's highest award for bravery during combat, the Medal of Honor. Harbourne's medal was won for his actions during the Second Battle of Petersburg on June 17, 1864. He was honored with the award on February 24, 1897.

Harbourne was born in England, and immigrated with his family to the US in 1850. He joined the Army from Readville, Massachusetts in May 1864, and was discharged due to disability only four months later.

== Medal of Honor citation ==
The President of the United States of America, in the name of Congress, takes pleasure in presenting the Medal of Honor to Private John H. Harbourne, United States Army, for extraordinary heroism on 17 June 1864, while serving with Company K, 29th Massachusetts Infantry, in action at Petersburg, Virginia, for capture of flag along with three enemy men.

== See also ==
- List of American Civil War Medal of Honor recipients: G–L
- Second Battle of Petersburg
- Overland Campaign
- 29th Massachusetts Infantry
