= Edgbaston Hall =

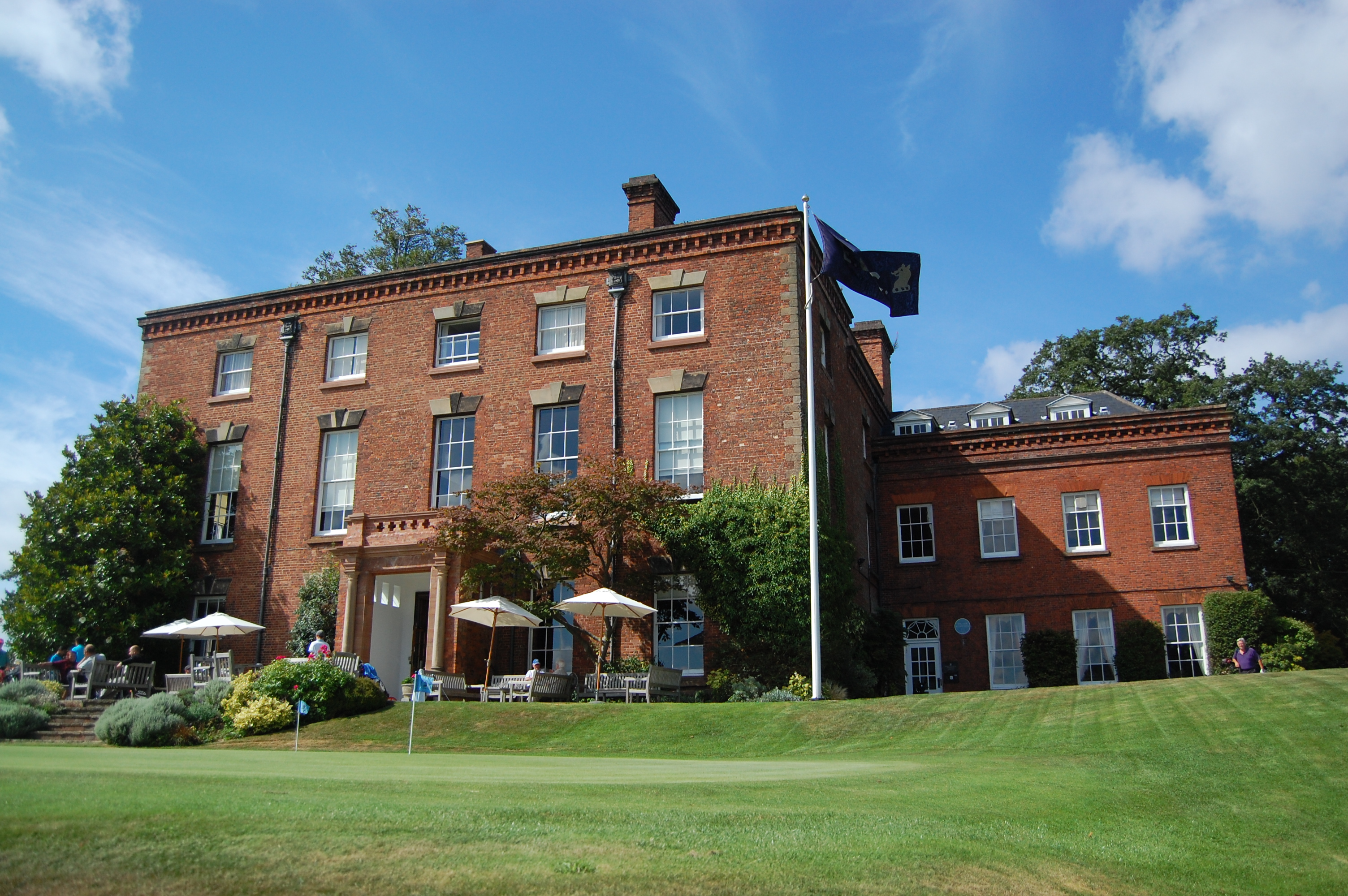
- The hall in August 2013
- Interactive map of the Edgbaston Hall area

General information
- Type: Mansion
- Architectural style: Georgian
- Location: Edgbaston, Birmingham, England
- Coordinates: 52.46022°N 1.91754°W
- Completed: 1717
- Owner: Calthorpe Estates

Technical details
- Floor count: 3

Design and construction
- Awards and prizes: Grade II listed

Edgbaston Hall (grid reference SP057847) is a country house (albeit now in the middle of the city) in the Edgbaston area of Birmingham, England.

== Description and current usage ==
Since 1936, through negotiations initiated by The Birmingham Civic Society with the owner, Calthorpe Estates, it has been the clubhouse for Edgbaston Golf Club. Edgbaston Hall, and its lodge house, are Grade II listed buildings. The grounds, which includes Edgbaston Pool, are now divided into an 18-hole golf course and a nature reserve.

== History ==
Early in the Civil War, Edgbaston Hall, along with Hawkesley House, now the site of a council housing estate in Longbridge, was a stronghold of Colonel John Fox, the so-called "Jovial Tinker". The Edgbaston Garrison musters from August 19, 1645 to April 30, 1646, can be found among the accounts of the Warwickshire County Committee, which was the Parliamentary Committee of accounts for the County, along with musters, warrants, levy assessments and other documents submitted by field officers and garrison commanders to be examined by the Committee. The garrison muster from 1645 lists about 40 soldiers and officers, including Thomas Rawlins, "a prisoner". The Edgbaston garrison troops had a fearsome reputation, making forays into the sounding villages for provisions and plunder and raiding rival royalist strongholds. They were highly mobile and so could be shifted around to augment the parliamentary garrisons at Tamworth, Coventry and Warwick.

In 1717, Sir Richard Gough purchased the hall from Thomas Belasyse, 3rd Viscount Fauconberg and began to have it rebuilt. In 1776, Sir Henry Gough commissioned Capability Brown to lay out the park. It was later home to William Withering.
