= Harborne Reserve =

Nature reserve in England

- Interactive map of Harborne Reserve
- Location: Harborne, Birmingham, England
- Coordinates: 52.466°N 1.951°W
- Operator: West Midland Bird Club
- Website: westmidlandbirdclub.org.uk/www02/harborne.html

Harborne Reserve (grid reference SP034851) is a nature reserve in Harborne, Birmingham, England, operated by the West Midland Bird Club. Entry is by permit only, except on advertised open days.

The reserve comprises two parts which total 9 acres (36,000 m^{2}) of disused allotments, leased from Birmingham City Council. It is located approximately three miles from Birmingham city centre, alongside the Harborne Walkway.

The reserve is bisected by the Chad Brook.
