= Harborne =

Area in Birmingham, England

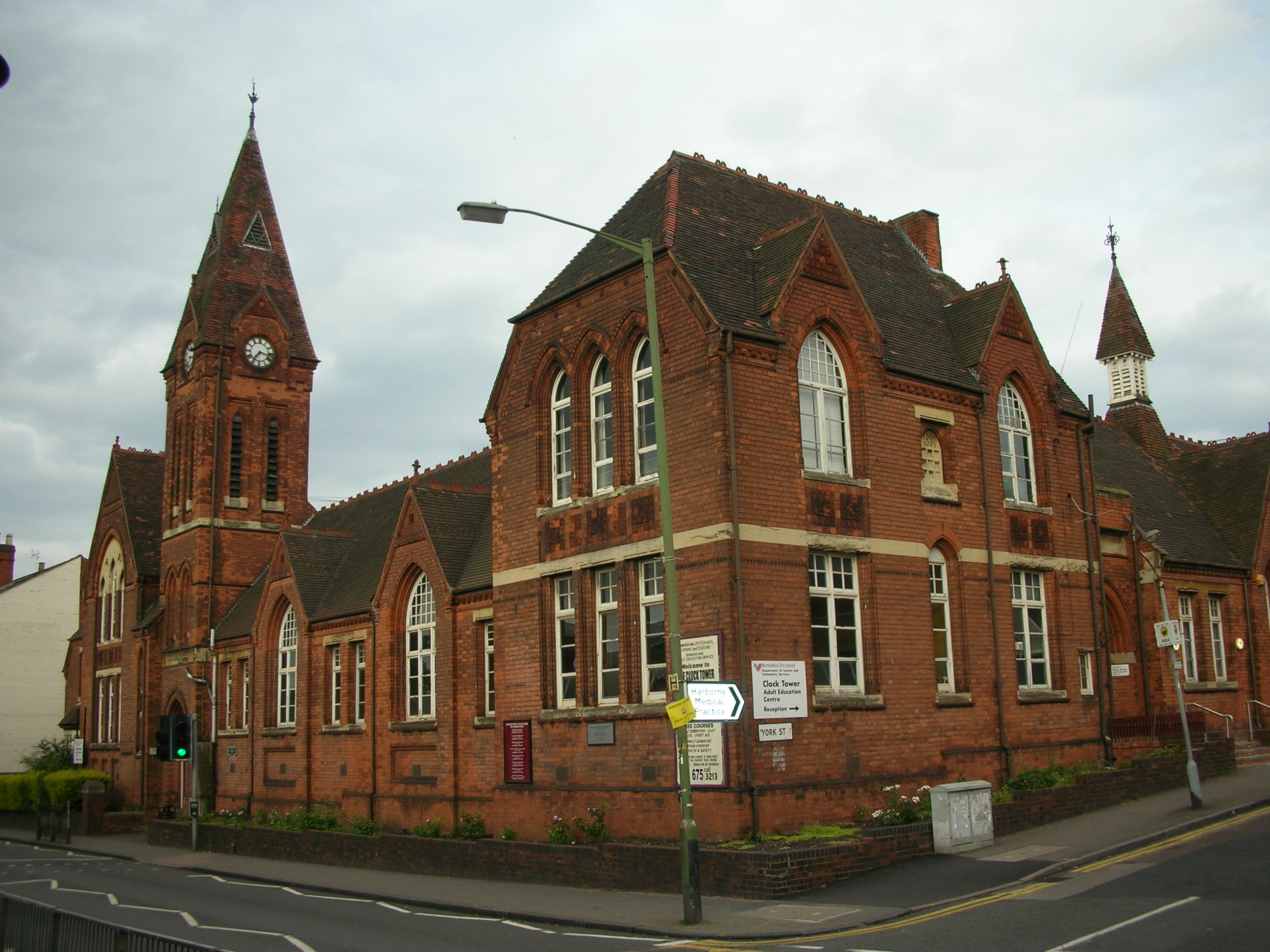
- The Clock Tower, Harborne

- Location within the West Midlands
- Population: 23,001 (2011.Ward)
- OS grid reference: SP020836
- Metropolitan borough: Birmingham
- Metropolitan county: West Midlands
- Region: West Midlands
- Country: England
- Sovereign state: United Kingdom
- Post town: BIRMINGHAM
- Postcode district: B17 & B32
- Dialling code: 0121
- Police: West Midlands
- Fire: West Midlands
- Ambulance: West Midlands
- UK Parliament: Birmingham Edgbaston

Harborne is an affluent area in Birmingham, West Midlands, England, historically in Staffordshire, located 3 miles (5 kilometres) south-west of Birmingham City Centre. It is a Birmingham City Council ward in the formal district and in the parliamentary constituency of Birmingham Edgbaston.

== History ==
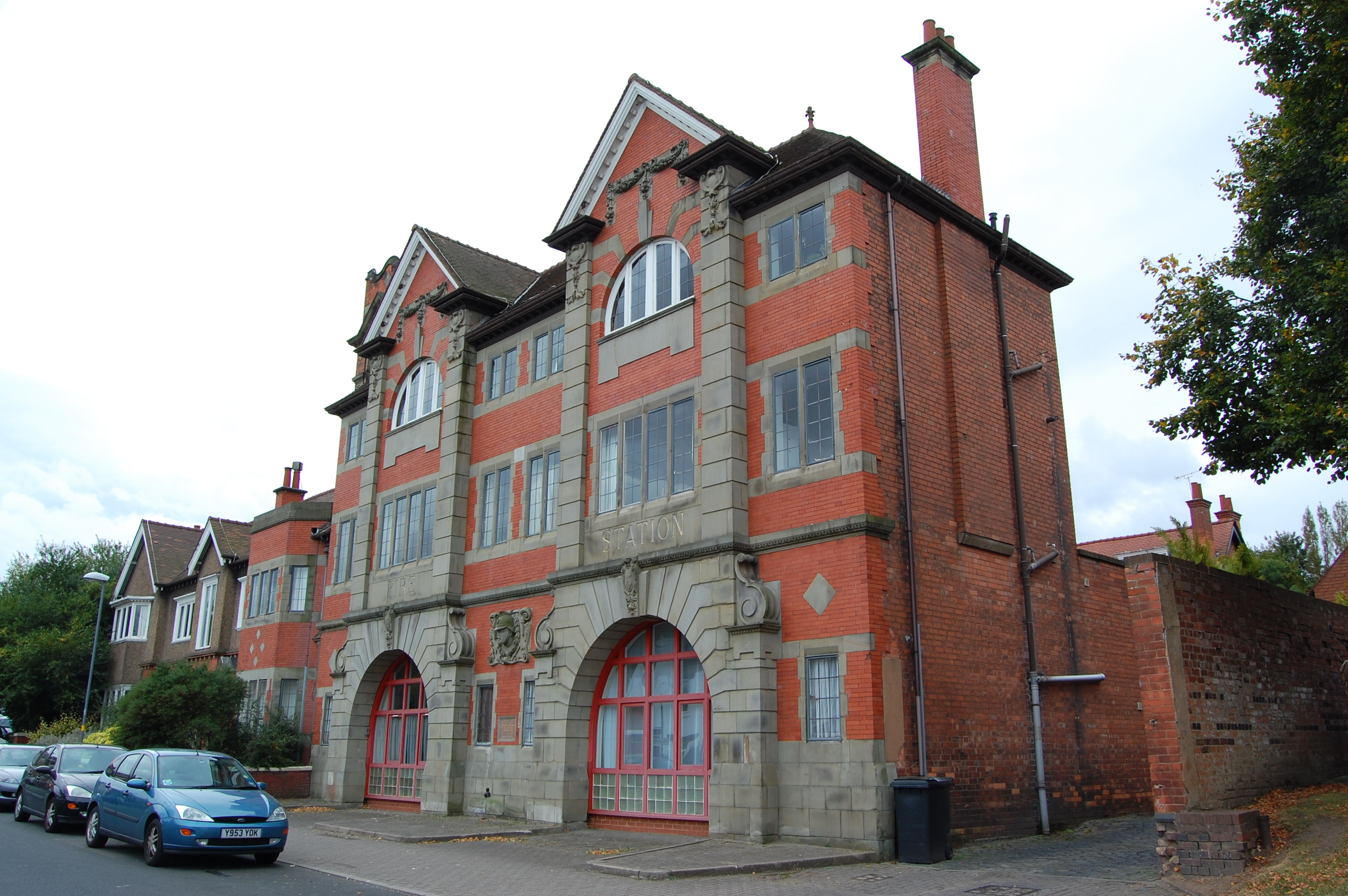
The former City of Birmingham fire station, now divided up and converted into private homes

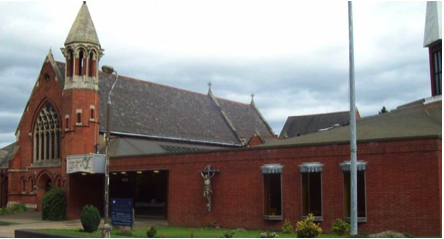
St Mary's RC Church on Vivian Road

There is evidence of a Roman fort around the Queen Elizabeth Hospital Birmingham and Metchley Park, near Harborne.

The earliest written mention of Harborne is an entry in the Domesday Book of 1086, however the settlement pre-dates this. The spelling of Harborne has appeared with several variations through the centuries, and the derivation of the place name has often been disputed. One of the more probable suggestions is 'boundary brook', although 'high brow' and 'dirty brook' are also possibilities.

In the 1800s, Harborne was still part of the historic county Staffordshire. Harborne is a Victorian suburb with a large stock of housing dating from pre-1900 (found mainly around the High Street), and the early 20th century. The oldest part of what is known locally as 'Harborne Village' is centred on St Peter's Church, (Church of England), Old Church Road, which dates from Anglo-Saxon times (St Chad preached there) and whose tower was (re)constructed in the 14th century.

As a non-Quaker area of the city, Harborne became well-supplied with public houses compared to nearby areas such as Edgbaston and Bournville. There is a famous Harborne Run pub crawl consisting of from 10 to 15 pubs (the agreed itinerary varies).

St Mary's Church was the first Roman Catholic congregation formed by the Passionists who worshiped in a disused Methodist Chapel on Harborne High Street from 1870. Building work started on the current church, in Vivian Road, on 8 September 1875 and it opened on 6 February 1877. The Augustinians (Austin Friars) arrived at St Mary's in 1973 to a growing Catholic population; work on a new church, attached to the side of the old church, started on 1 August 1977 and was finished in 56 weeks. St Mary's Parish Centre was opened in 1990 and is next door to the church.

Harborne railway station opened on 10 August 1874, at the end of the short Harborne Branch Line; this left the London, Midland and Scottish Railway's Birmingham-Wolverhampton line at Ladywood. It was closed to passengers on 26 November 1934 and to freight traffic in November 1963. The former trackbed forms the Harborne Walkway, a two-mile (3 km) nature walk and cycling route from Harborne to Ladywood, where the canal can be followed either to Birmingham or Wolverhampton.

Harborne became part of the county borough of Birmingham and thus transferred from Staffordshire to Warwickshire in 1891 by the Local Govt. Bd.'s Prov. Orders Conf. (No. 13) Act, 54 & 55 Vic. c. 161 (local act), or in 1894. In 1911, the civil parish had a population of 13,902. On 1 April 1912, the parish was abolished and merged with Birmingham. It then became part of the West Midlands in 1974 by the Local Government Act 1972.

== Geography ==
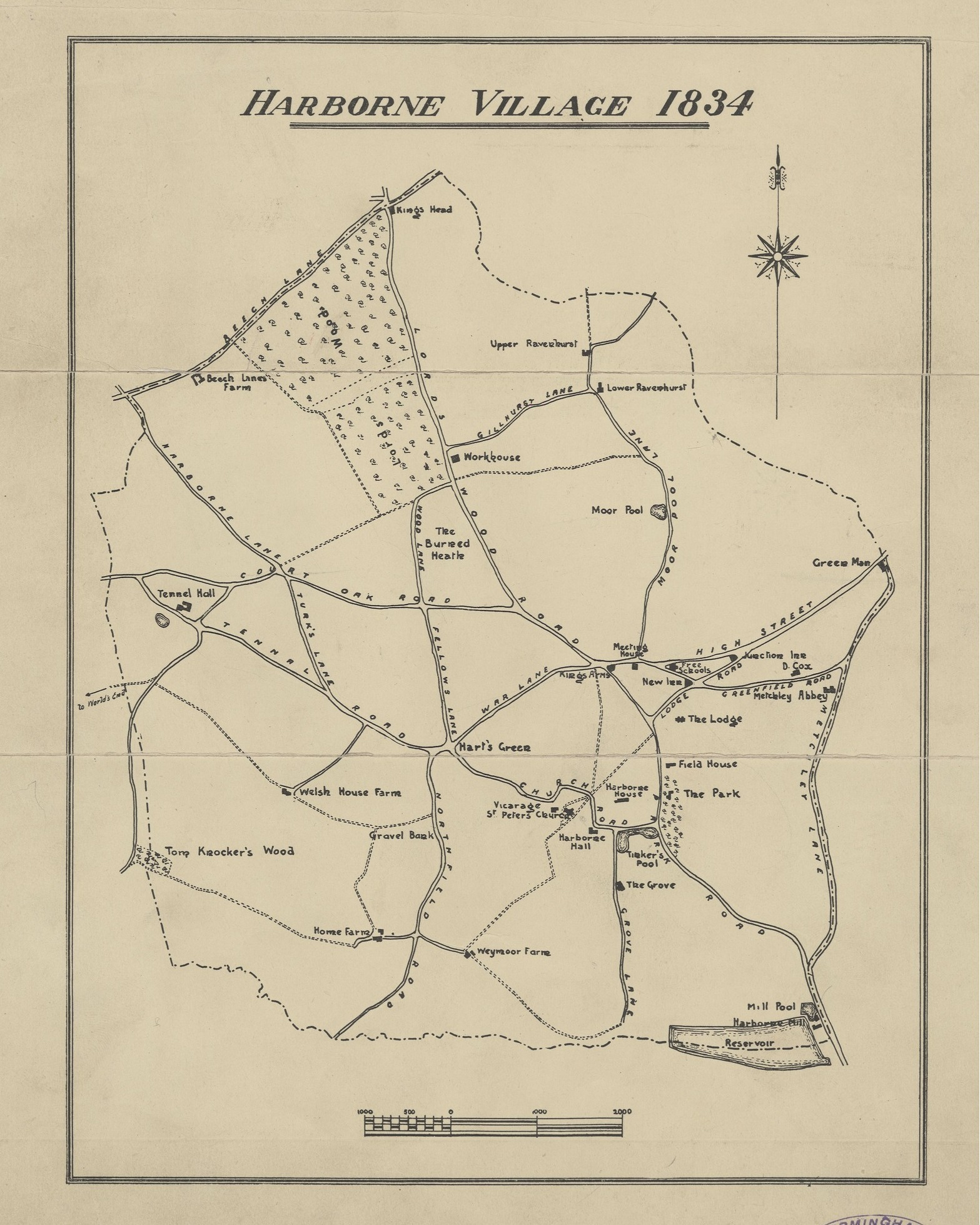
Plan of Harborne Village in 1834

Harborne lies to the west of Edgbaston, to the north of Selly Oak, to the east of Quinton, and to the south of the Bearwood and Warley areas of neighbouring Sandwell.

As a parish, it covered an area of 3,300 acres (1,300 hectares), 100 acres (40 hectares) of which was of woodland and plantations.

Harts Green is an area of Harborne.

Beech Lanes is a suburban area of Harbone that began to be developed between 1872 and 1908.

== Demographics ==
The United Kingdom 2011 census revealed that 23,001 lived in Harborne; 17% of people were aged under 16, 69% were aged between 16 and 64, while 14% were aged over 65. The minority ethnic population made up 33% of the ward's population, compared with 41% for Birmingham. The census found that 75% (11,997) of the population aged 16 to 74 were working or seeking work, which compared with 69% for Birmingham.

== Education ==
There are four secondary schools in Harborne: Baskerville School, Harborne Academy, Lordswood Boys' School and Lordswood Girls' School.

There are six primary schools: Birmingham Blue Coat School, Chad Vale Primary School (both lie on the border between Harborne and Edgbaston), Harborne Primary School, St Mary's Catholic Primary School, St Peter's Church of England Primary School and Welsh House Farm Community School.

Harborne is currently served by Harborne Library which formally opened on 12 November 1892, occupying a former Masonic Hall, which was built in 1879.

=== Harborne Primary School ===
Harborne Primary School

Location
- Station Road; Harborne; Birmingham, West Midlands, B17 9LU; England; 52°27′32″N 1°57′11″W

Information
- Type: Community School
- Established: 1 September 2000
- Local authority: Birmingham
- Department for Education URN: 132261 Tables
- Ofsted: Reports
- Chair of the Governors: Karen Mackenzie
- Principal: Mr Mark Slater
- Head of School: Mrs Mandy Hughes
- Gender: Coeducational
- Age: 4 to 11
- Enrolment: 629
- Capacity: 595
- Houses: Hanover; Stuart; Tudor; Windsor
- Colours: Red and Yellow
- Website: http://www.harborne.bham.sch.uk

Harborne Primary School is a co-educational primary school for pupils aged 4 to 11. As of September 2014, the school had 629 students.

The Edwardian infant school opened in 1902; a junior school was added to the site in 1912. In September 2000 the two schools were merged, forming Harborne Primary School as it is today.

On 27 April 2011, a roof fire caused significant damage to the structure of the junior school. More than 60 firefighters tackled the blaze. None of the pupils or staff were injured. The infant school reopened a week later, with the juniors moved to nearby Harborne Hall hotel for six months whilst the rebuild took place. Birmingham City Council awarded the school £1.3 million for the rebuild project, which was completed a year later, in April 2012.

In 2015, the school submitted plans to build an annex site on the ground of Lordswood Girls' School, to expand the school from 630 to 1050 places. The plans were opposed by residents of the nearby Hagley Road Retirement Village. Further plans were submitted for a site on Court Oak Road, near Queen Alexandra College, to expand the school to 840 pupil places. In preparation for the expansion, the school will accept a further 30 reception children on its main site in September 2018. The one form entry annexe opened in September 2019.

== Politics ==
Harborne ward forms part of the Birmingham Edgbaston constituency at Westminster, represented by Labour's Preet Kaur Gill since 2017. At local government level, Harborne ward is represented on Birmingham City Council by one Independent councillor, Martin Brooks, and one Green Party councillor, Kevin Carmody.

The former leader of Birmingham City Council, Mike Whitby, was a councillor in Harborne from 1997 to 2014 and was made a life peer taking the title of Baron Whitby, of Harborne in the City of Birmingham.

The ward has a Ward Support Officer.

== Transport ==
=== Buses ===
National Express West Midlands is the primary bus operator in the area. Key routes include:

- 11A and 11C Birmingham Outer Circle (clockwise)
- Services to Birmingham, Dudley, Halesowen, Perry Barr and West Bromwich.

=== Railway ===
Since the closure of Harborne railway station in 1934, the area's closest station has been University. West Midlands Trains operates services on the Cross-City Line to Redditch, Birmingham New Street and Lichfield Trent Valley; it also runs longer-distance services to Hereford. CrossCountry operates hourly services between Cardiff Central, Birmingham New Street and Nottingham.

== Culture ==
=== Sport and leisure ===
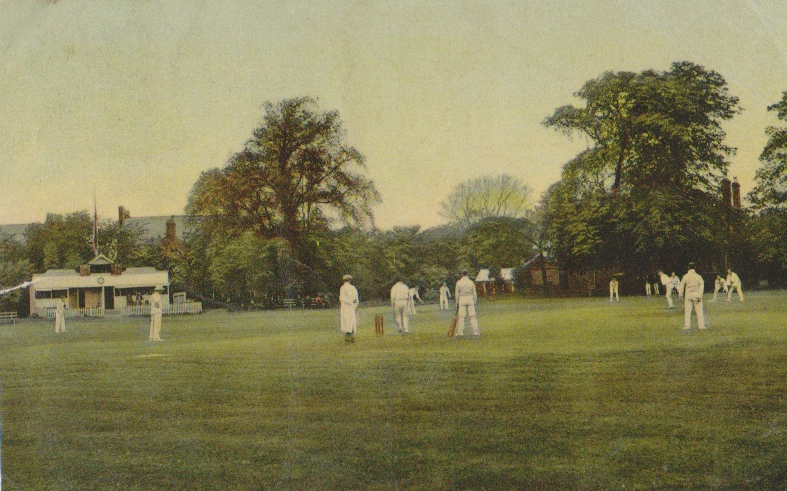
The Cricket Ground, c1906

Harborne Hockey Club was founded in 1903. The club has six ladies' and five men's teams as well as a youth section. It is the only club in the West Midlands to be affiliated to Flyerz Hockey, which supports people with disabilities to play sport.

Harborne's tennis court facilities can be found in Moorpool at The Circle and on Moor Pool Avenue. Harborne has three bowling greens, two at public houses (Green Man and The Bell) and one in Moorpool. Grove Park and Queens Park are both in Harborne.

There are two golf courses, (Harborne Golf Course and Harborne Municipal Golf Course, as well as a cricket ground. When the swimming pool was rebuilt and opened in 2012, it was Birmingham's first new swimming pool for more than twenty years; the centre also houses fitness facilities. Harborne is bordered by Bourn Brook Walkway on the south and Harborne Walkway to the north east.

=== Food and drink ===
==== Harborne Run ====
The Harborne Mile is a pub crawl from one end of Harborne High Street (and ancillary roads) to the other, involving all or some of the public houses listed below.

===== Current pubs =====
Name	Image	Former name(s)	Operator	Location	Date	Grid ref. Geo-coordinates
White Swan		Steady	Mitchells & Butlers; Premium Country Pubs	Harborne Road, B15 3TT	c. 1800 – c. 1850	52.4666°N 1.9343°W
Green Man		Steady	Mitchells & Butlers; Ember Inns	2 High Street, B17 9NE	c. 1940	52.4610°N 1.9431°W
The Plough		Steady	Independent	21 High Street, B17 9NT		52.4611°N 1.9436°W
The Hop Garden		The Sportsman	Independent	19 Metchley Lane, B17 0HT		52.4599°N 1.9432°W
White Horse		Steady	Independent	2 York Street, B17 0HG		52.4592°N 1.9465°W
Harborne Stores		Steady	Stonegate Pub Company	109 High Street, B17 9NP		52.4593°N 1.9477°W
Slug and Lettuce		The Proverbial; The Varsity	Stonegate Pub Company	186-196 High Street, B17 9PP		52.4585°N 1.9493°W
The Junction		Steady	Mitchells & Butlers; Castle Pubs	212 High Street, B17 9PT	1904	52.4583°N 1.9503°W
The New Inn		Steady	Marston's Brewery	74 Vivian Road, B17 0DJ	c. 1883	52.4574°N 1.9527°W
O'Neils		The Vine	Mitchells & Butlers; Sizzling Pubs	310 High Street, B17 9PU	c. 1830s	52.4580°N 1.9548°W
The Bell		Steady	Stonegate Pub Company	11 Old Church Road, B17 0BB	c. 1700 – c. 1800	52.4538°N 1.9593°W

===== Former pubs =====
Name	Image	Former name(s)	Operator	Location	Dates	Grid ref. Geo-coordinates
Fish Inn				Fish Lane (now North Road)		
The Huntsman		The Kings Arms		356 High Street, B17 9PU	?-2013	52.4579°N 1.9567°W
The Duke of York						52.4583°N 1.9579°W
Scarlet Pimpernel				Tennal Road, B32 2JE		52.4551°N 1.9660°W
Sommar Bar		Drinks World, The Paper Duck	Independent	115 High Street, B17 9JT		52.4592°N 1.9478°W

== Notable residents ==
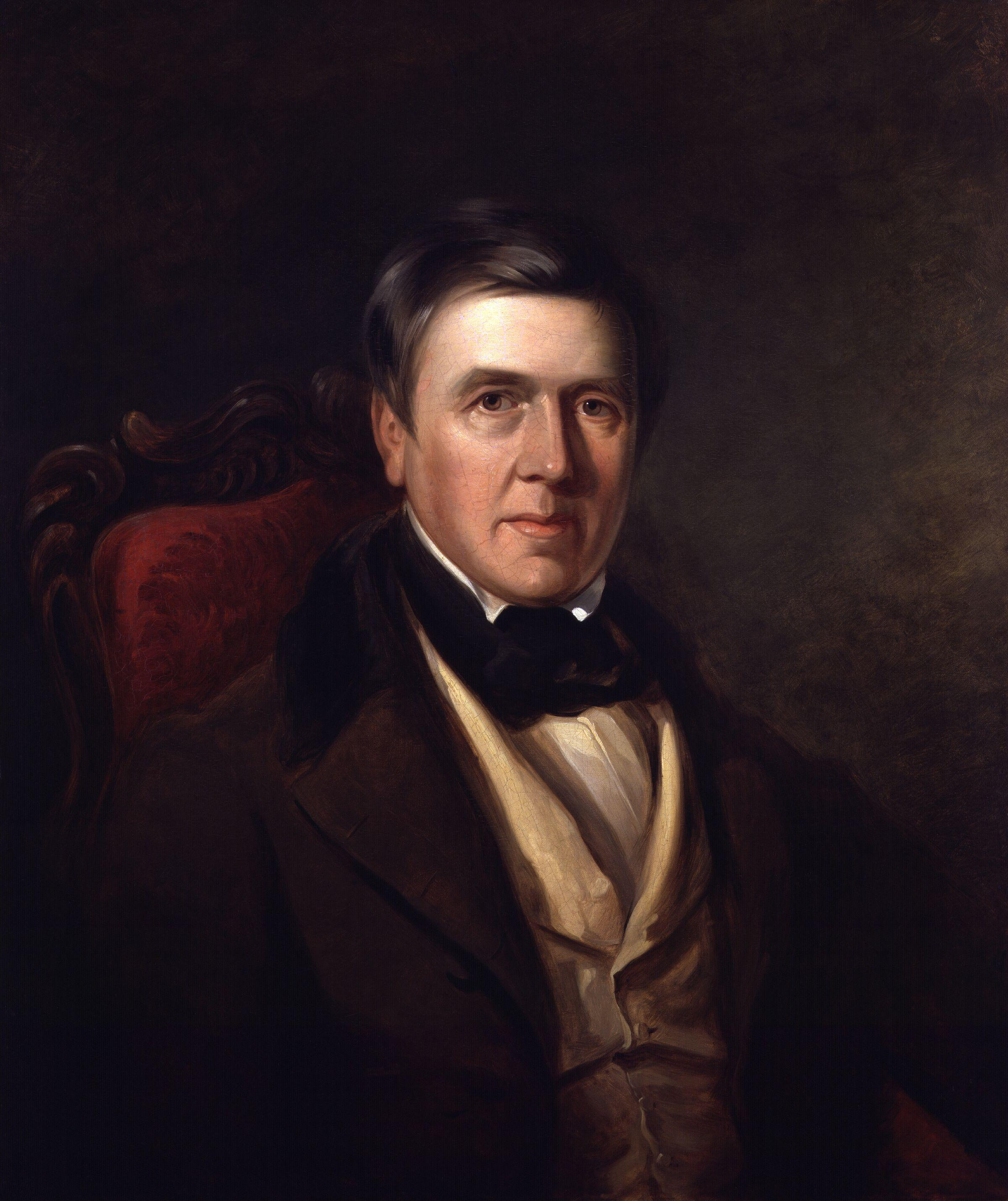
David Cox, 1856

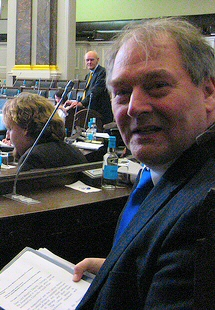
Mike Whitby, 2008

- David Cox (1783–1859), an English landscape painter of the Birmingham School.
- Thomas Attwood (1783–1856), banker, economist, political campaigner and MP.
- Thomas Baker (1809–1864), a Midlands landscape painter and watercolourist
- Elihu Burritt (1810–1879), an American diplomat, philanthropist and social activist.
- Edward Augustus Freeman (1823–1892), an English historian.
- Ethel Arnold (1865–1930), journalist, author and lecturer on female suffrage.
- Granville Bantock (1868–1946), composer of classical music.
- Alfred Priest (1874–1929), portrait painter.
- Francis William Aston FRS (1877–1945), chemist and physicist, won the 1922 Nobel Prize in Chemistry.
- Sir Henry Rushbury KCVO CBE RA (1889–1968), painter and etcher.
- George Edward Hunt (1892–1960), an Arts and Crafts jeweller.
- Hester Adrian, Baroness Adrian DBE (1899–1966), mental health worker.
- W. H. Auden (1907–1973), a British-American poet.
- Paul Grice (1913–1988), a philosopher of language
- Tony Shryane MBE (1919–2003), BBC radio programme producer
- Steve Gibbons (born 1941), singer-songwriter, guitarist and bandleader
- Mike Whitby (born 1948), politician, peer and former leader of Birmingham City Council
- Adrian Goldberg (born 1961), journalist, radio and TV presenter.
- Corrinne Wicks (born 1968), actress.
- Ben Richards (born 1972), stage and TV actor and dancer.
- Sarah Manners (born 1975), actress.
- Ocean Colour Scene (formed in 1989), rock band.

=== Sport ===
- John James (born 1934), former footballer with 130 appearances
- Johnny Giles (born 1940), former footballer and manager.
- Dennis Amiss MBE (born 1943), a former English cricketer, played 50 Test matches.

== See also ==
- Harborne carnival
- Chad Valley, Birmingham
- Harborne Primary School
- Harborne Railway
- Harborne railway station
- Harborne Reserve
- Moor Pool
- St Peter's Church, Harborne
