= Strange (surname) =

Strange, Le Strange or le Strange is a surname. It may refer to:

== People ==
- Adario Strange, American writer, editor, film director and artist
- Alan Strange (1906–1994), American Major League Baseball player
- Albert Strange (1855–1917), English artist and yacht designer
- Alexander Strange (1818–1876), British Indian Army officer, took part in the Great Trigonometrical Survey of India
- Alfred Strange (1900–1978), English footballer
- Allen Strange (1943–2008), American composer
- Barry Strange, Australian rules footballer in the 1950s and '60s
- Billy Strange (1930–2012), American musician
- Brenton Strange (born 2000), American football player
- Charles Strange (1909–1992), Canadian politician from Ontario
- Cole Strange (born 1998), American football player
- Curtis Strange (born 1955), American golfer
- Cy Strange (1915–1987), Canadian radio broadcaster
- David Strange, English cellist and professor
- Dee Strange-Gordon (born 1988), American baseball player
- Doug Strange (born 1964), former Major League Baseball player
- Edmund Strange (1871–1925), English footballer
- Frederick Strange (–1854) English natural history collector, active until death in Australia.
- Frederick William Strange (1844–1897), English-born Canadian physician, surgeon and politician from Ontario
- Frederick William Strange (rower) (1853–1889), Englishman who promoted competitive outdoor sports in Japan
- Glenn Strange (1899–1973), American actor
- Graham Strange (born 1968), Bermudian cricketer
- Guy Le Strange (1854–1933), British Orientalist
- Helena Pedersdatter Strange (c. 1200–1255), queen consort of Sweden, spouse of King Canute II
- Ian Strange (British artist) (1934–2018), British-born Falkland Islands writer and naturalist
- James Charles Stuart Strange (1753–1840), British officer and trader
- James F. Strange (1872–1926), American politician from Maryland
- Jason Strange (born 1973), Welsh rugby union player
- John Strange (disambiguation), a list of people named John or Johnny
- Llewellyn Strange (1892–1973), Canadian police chief and politician from Newfoundland
- Louis Strange (1891–1966), English aviator in both world wars
- Luther Strange (born 1953), 49th Attorney General of Alabama and United States Senator
- Maxwell W. Strange (1820–1880), Canadian lawyer and politician from Ontario
- Michael Strange (boxer) (born 1970), Canadian retired boxer
- Hidenokuni Hajime, English-born sumo wrestler born Nathan John Strange in 1971
- Orlando Strange (1826–1906), Canadian physician and politician from Ontario, brother of Maxwell
- Pat Strange (born 1980), American former baseball pitcher
- Pete Strange (1938–2004), English jazz trombonist
- Philip Strange (1884–1963), British actor
- Raymond Strange (1878–1962), New Zealand cricketer
- Richard Strange (born 1951), English writer, actor, musician, curator, teacher, adventurer and founder and front man of the band Doctors of Madness
- Richard Strange (Jesuit) (1611–1683), English Jesuit
- Richard Strange (MP for Hereford) (fl. 1414-1421), Member of Parliament
- Robert Strange (disambiguation)
- Sarah Strange (born 1974), Canadian actress
- Scott Strange (born 1977), Australian golfer
- Sharan Strange (born 1959), American poet
- Steve Strange (1959–2015), Welsh pop singer, member of the band Visage
- Susan Strange (1923–1998), British political economist
- Terence Strange, English cricketer up to 1970
- Thomas Strange (disambiguation)
- Todd Strange (born 1944), American politician from Alabama
- Todd Strange (born 1966), bassist in Crowbar
- William Alder Strange (1813-1874), headmaster of Abingdon School

== Fictional characters ==
- Doctor Strange, a Marvel comics character
- Adam Strange, a DC comics character
- Hugo Strange, a DC comics character
- Chief Superintendent Strange, a senior police officer in the television series Inspector Morse
- Jonathan Strange, a magician

== See also ==
- Clan Strange
- Strang
- L'Estrange, a list of people with the surname L'Estrange, Lestrange, Le Strange, and minor variations thereof
