= L'Estrange =

L'Estrange and its various spelling variants represent an English surname, derived from the Old French word l'estranger ("the foreigner") and may refer to any of the following people or characters.

== People ==
=== L'Estrange ===
- Alexander L'Estrange (born 1974), English composer and jazz musician
- Charles James L'Estrange (1867–1947), children's fiction author who used the pen name Herbert Strang along with George Herbert Ely (1866–1958)
- Francis L'Estrange (c. 1756–1836), Irish surgeon, President of the Royal College of Surgeons in Ireland
- Gerry L'Estrange (1917–1996), Irish politician
- Heath L'Estrange (born 1985), Australian rugby league player
- Henri L'Estrange (c. 1842–c. 1900), Australian tightrope walker and balloonist
- Herbert L'Estrange Ewen (1876–1912), British philatelist
- Laurence L'Estrange (1912-1990), British diplomat and former British Ambassador to Honduras
- Larry L'Estrange (1934-2007), British paratrooper and rugby union player
- Michael L'Estrange (born 1952), Australian academic and former public servant
- Nicholas L'Estrange (1511–1580), English Member of Parliament
- Peter L'Estrange, 20th-century Australian Jesuit priest
- Richard L'Estrange (1500s), English Member of Parliament
- Roger L'Estrange (1616–1704), English pamphleteer and author
- Sean L'Estrange (born 1967), Australian politician

=== Lestrange or de Lestrange ===
- Augustin de Lestrange (1754–1827), French Trappist
- Gisèle Lestrange (1927–1991), French graphic artist
- John Lestrange (died 1269), English landowner, administrator and soldier

=== Le Strange or le Strange ===
- some early bearers of the English title Baron Strange, including:
  - Eubulus le Strange, 1st Baron Strange (died 1335), an especially competent and trusted military officer for King Edward III
- some early bearers of the English title Baron Strange of Blackmere, including:
  - Fulk le Strange, 1st Baron Strange of Blackmere (died 1324)
- Guy Le Strange (1854–1933), English orientalist
- Hamon le Strange (1583–1654), English politician
- Sir Thomas Le Strange (1494–1545), an Esquire of the Body to Henry VIII

== Fictional characters ==
- Bellatrix Lestrange, in the Harry Potter series
- Gary Le Strange, created by comedian Waen Shepherd
- Leta Lestrange, a fictional witch in the Wizarding World
- Estelle Lestrange, a fictional character in The Murder at the Vicarage by Agatha Christie
