= Strangio =

Strangio is an Italian surname. Notable people with the surname include:

- Chase Strangio (born 1982), American lawyer and transgender rights activist
- Giovanni Strangio (born 1979), Italian member of Calabria Mafia

== See also ==
- Strange (surname)
