= Charles Blondin =

French tightrope walker (1824–1897)

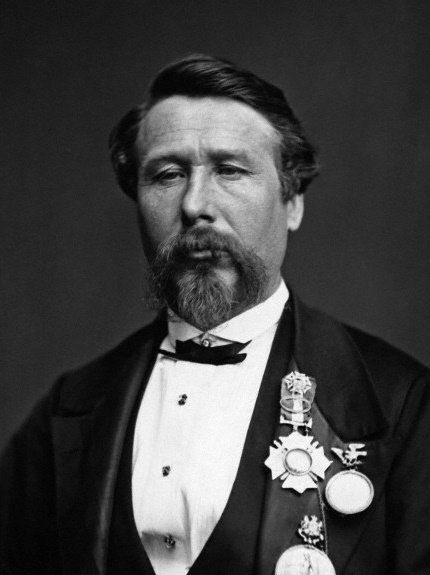
- Born: Jean François Gravelet; 28 February 1824; Hesdin, Pas-de-Calais, France
- Died: 22 February 1897 (aged 72); Ealing, London, England
- Occupation: Tightrope walker
- Spouses: Marie Blancherie; Charlotte Lawrence (died 1888) Katherine James (m. 1895)
- Children: 8

Charles Blondin (born Jean François Gravelet, 28 February 1824 – 22 February 1897) was a French tightrope walker and acrobat who achieved international fame in the mid-19th century. Known for crossing the Niagara Gorge on a tightrope, he toured the United States and beyond.

During an event in Dublin in 1860, the rope on which he was walking broke and two workers were killed, although Blondin was not injured.

He married three times and had eight children. His name became synonymous with tightrope walking.

== Early life ==
Blondin was born on 28 February 1824 in Hesdin, Pas-de-Calais, France. His birth name was Jean-François Gravelet. He performed professionally as Blondin, although the British press frequently referred to him as "Charles Blondin", a name not used in his own publicity. He was also billed as Jean-François Blondin, Chevalier Blondin, and The Great Blondin. At the age of five, he was sent to the École de Gymnase in Lyon and, after six months of training as an acrobat, made his first public appearance as "The Boy Wonder". His superior skill and grace, as well as the originality of the settings of his acts, made him a popular favourite.

== North America ==
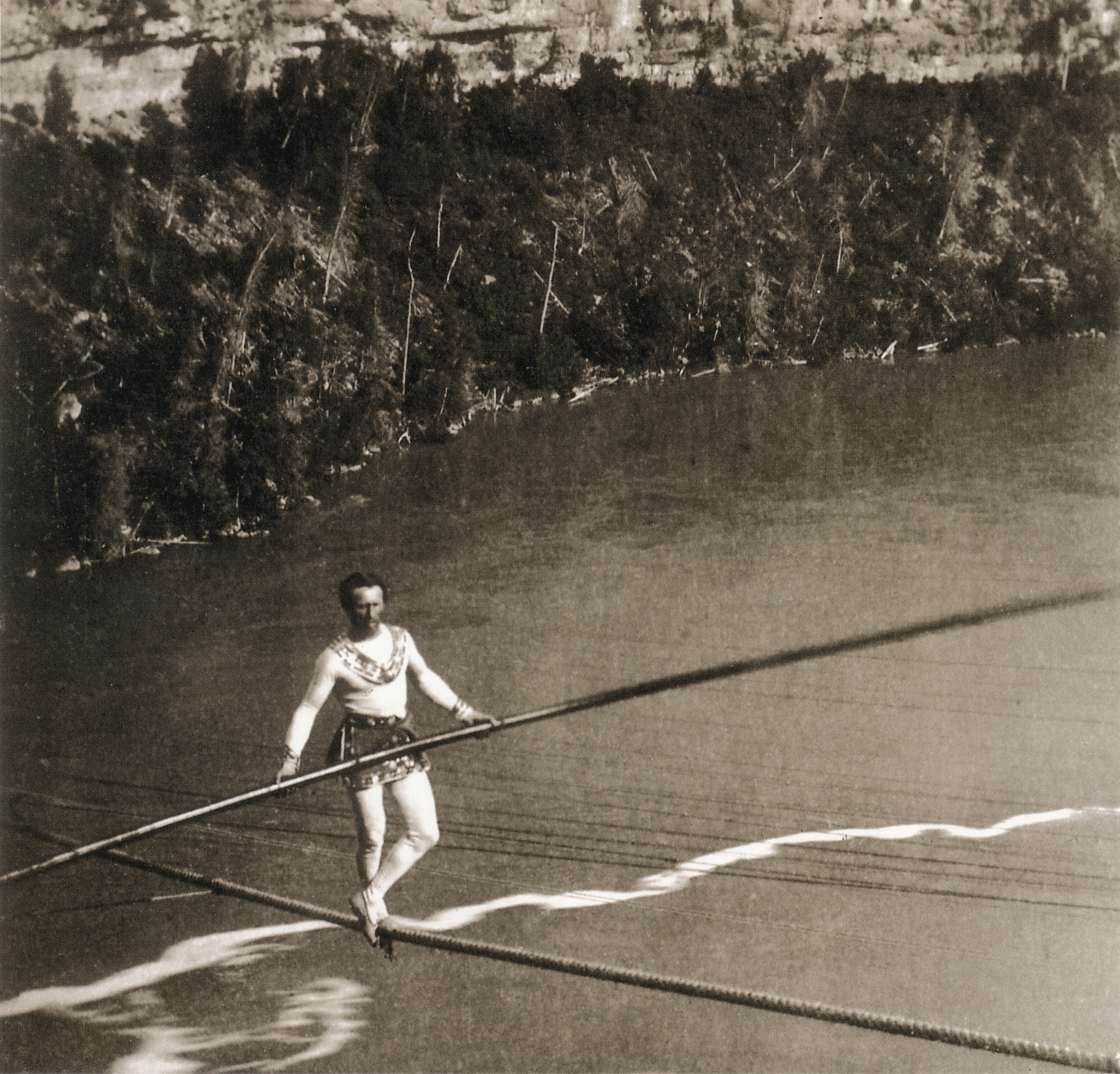
Charles Blondin crossing the Niagara River in 1859

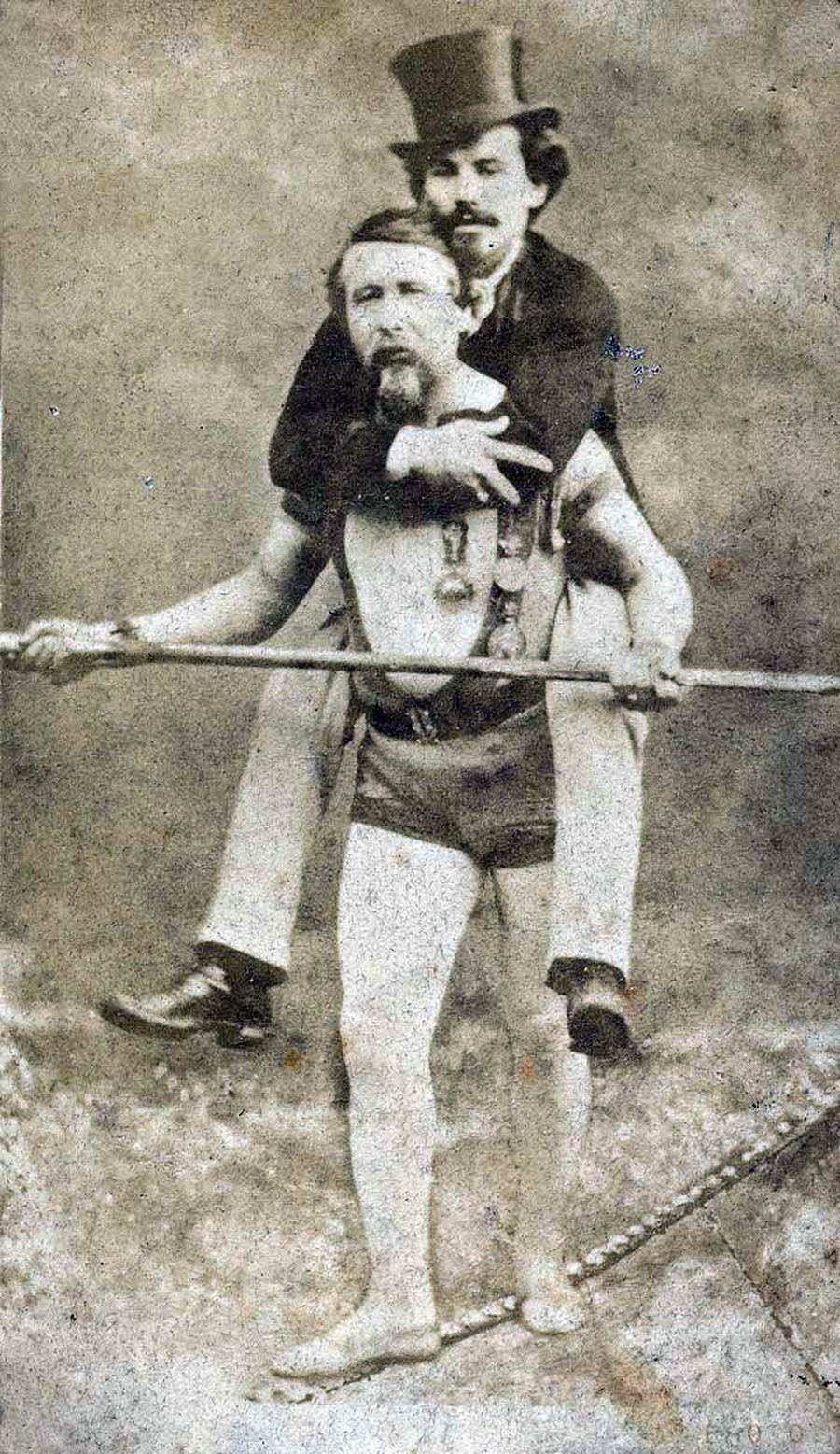
Charles Blondin carrying Colcord on a tightrope

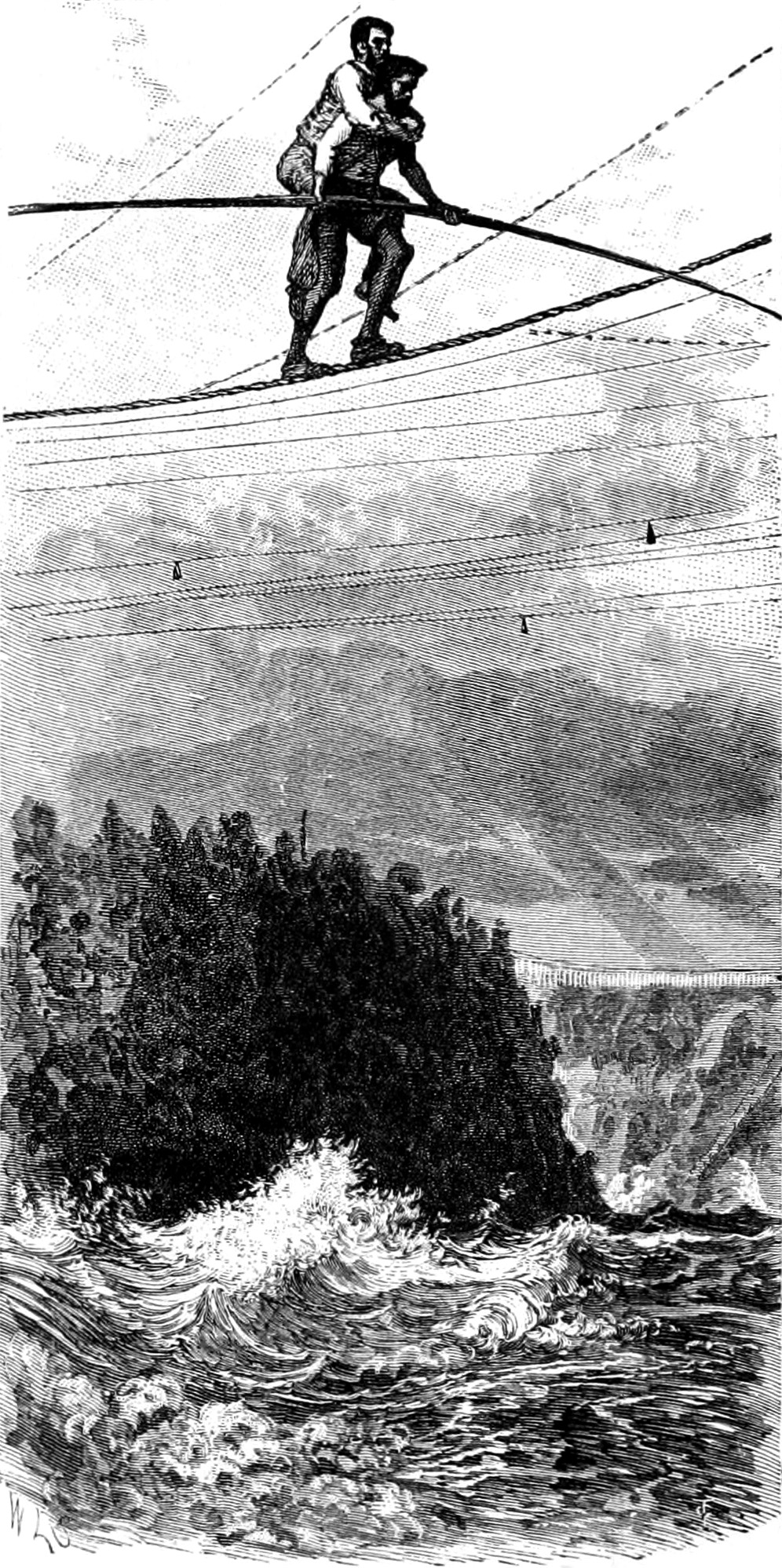
Engraving (c. 1883) of Blondin crossing Niagara with his manager, Harry Colcord, on his back

Blondin went to the United States in 1855. He was encouraged by William Niblo to perform with the Ravel troupe in New York City and was subsequently part proprietor of a circus. He especially owed his celebrity and fortune to his idea to cross the Niagara Gorge (on the Canada–U.S. border) on a tightrope, 1,100 ft (340 m) long, 3.25 in (8.3 cm) in diameter and 160 ft (49 m) above the water, near the location of the current Rainbow Bridge. This he did on 30 June 1859, and a number of times thereafter, often with different theatrical variations: blindfolded, in a sack, trundling a wheelbarrow, on stilts, carrying his manager Harry Colcord on his back, sitting down midway while he cooked and ate an omelette, or standing on a chair with only one of its legs balanced on the rope.

== Britain and Ireland ==
On 23 August 1860, he performed at the Royal Portobello Gardens, on South Circular Road, Portobello, Dublin, on a rope 50 feet (15 m) feet above the ground. While he was performing, the rope broke, which led to the collapse of the scaffolding. Blondin was not injured, but two workers who were on the scaffolding fell to their deaths. An investigation was held, and the broken rope (reportedly 2 inches (5 cm) in diameter and 5 inches (13 cm) in circumference) examined. No blame was attributed at the time to either Blondin or his manager; the judge said that the rope manufacturer had a lot to answer for. The organiser of the event, a Mr. Kirby, said he would never have another one like it. A bench warrant for the arrest of Blondin and his manager was issued when they did not appear at a further trial, having returned to the US.

In 1861, Blondin first appeared in London, at the Crystal Palace, turning somersaults on stilts on a rope stretched across the central transept 70 feet (21 m) from the ground. He performed in September 1861 in Edinburgh, Scotland, at the Royal Botanic Gardens (then called the Experimental Gardens) on Inverleith Row.

The following year, Blondin was back at the same venue in Dublin, this time performing 100 feet (30 m) above the ground. He gave a series of other performances in 1862, as well, again at the Crystal Palace, and elsewhere in England and Europe. On 6 September 1873, Blondin crossed Edgbaston Reservoir in Birmingham. A statue built in 1992 on the nearby Ladywood Middleway marks his feat.

In October 1869, Blondin appeared in London at The Crystal Palace Harvest Fete. He traversed the long rope on a bicycle expressly made for the occasion. The bicycle was manufactured by Messrs. Gardiner and Mackintosh, engineers at New Cross and had no weights or attachments of any kind. The bicycle was a replica of a normal bicycle with the exception of the wheels which were deeply grooved to hold the rope.

On 3 August 1896, at the age of 71, Blondin walked on a tightrope across Waterloo Lake in Roundhay Park Leeds, several times. On one crossing he was blindfolded and on another he stopped to cook himself an omelette and eat it.

== Later years and death ==
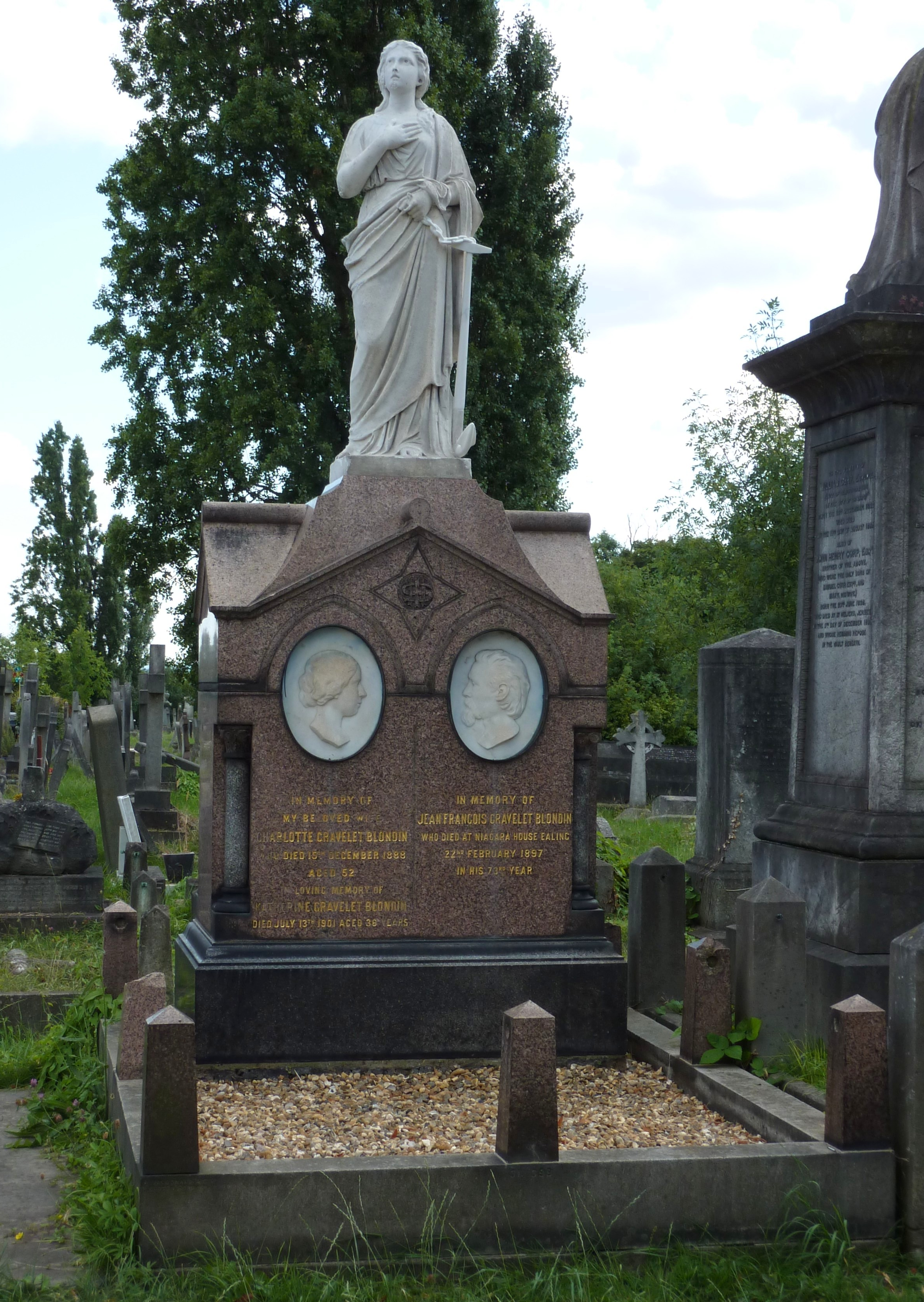
Blondin's grave at Kensal Green Cemetery, London

After a period of retirement, Blondin reappeared in 1880 and starred in the 1893–94 season of the pantomime Jack and the Beanstalk at the Crystal Palace, organised by Oscar Barrett. His final performance was in Leeds, England in 1896.

Blondin died from complications of diabetes at his "Niagara House" in Ealing, London, on 22 February 1897, at age 72 and was buried in Kensal Green Cemetery. His estate at death was valued at £1,832 (£255,000 as of 2024).

== Personal life ==
Charles Blondin married Marie Blancherie on 6 August 1846, legitimising their son Aime Leopold, after which they had two more children. He was still legally married to Blancherie when he moved to America.

While in the U.S. he married a second wife, Charlotte Lawrence in Boston, Massachusetts in 1852. Together they had five children: Adele (b. 1854), Edward (b. 1855), Iris (b. 1861), Henry Coleman (b. 1862), and Charlotte (b. 1866). In 1895, Blondin married again, this time in the United Kingdom. His third wife, Katherine James, had nursed him through a back injury earlier that year. Although much younger, Katherine survived him by only four years, dying of cancer in 1901 at the age of 36.

== Legacy ==
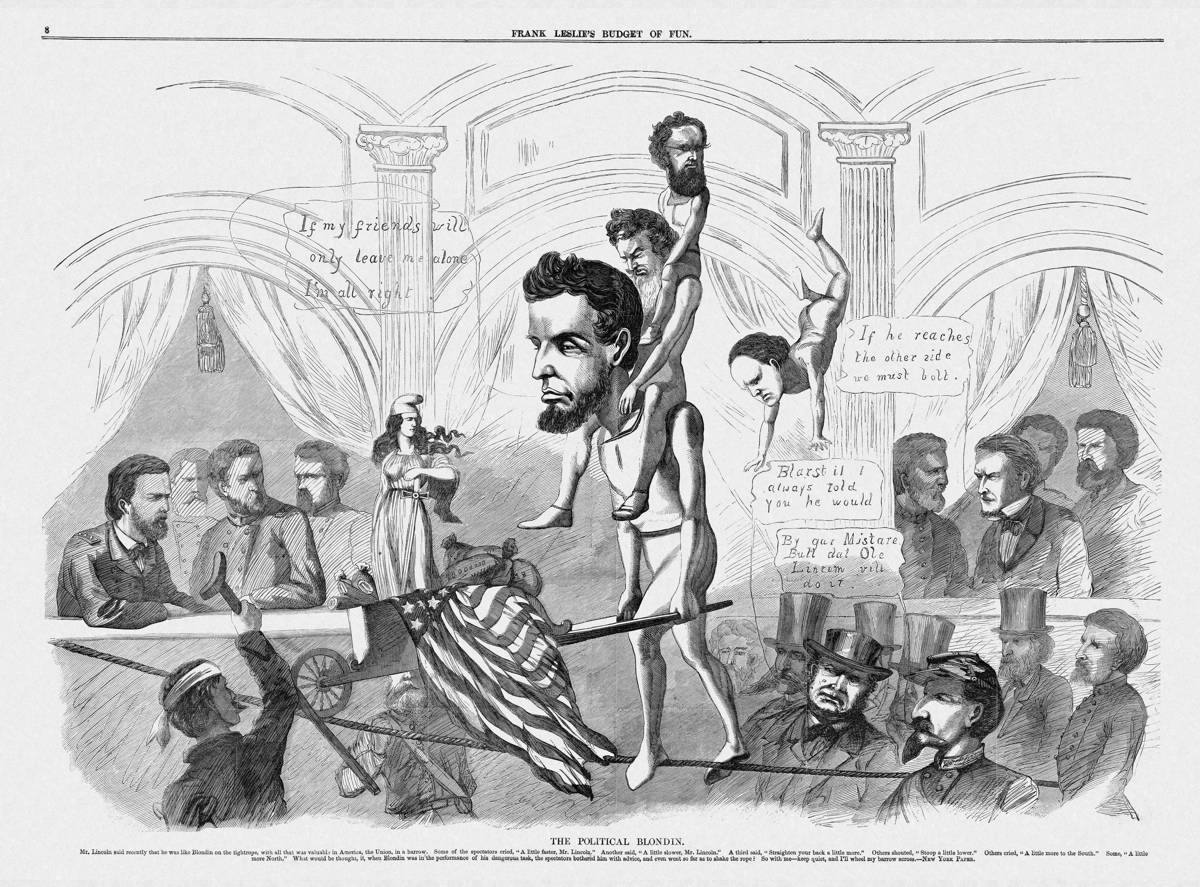
Abraham Lincoln depicted as Charles Blondin

During his lifetime, Blondin's name became so synonymous with tightrope walking that many employed the name "Blondin" to describe others in the sport. For example, there were at least five people working with variations of the Blondin name in Sydney in the 1880s, the most famous of whom was Henri L'Estrange—"the Australian Blondin". So popular had tightrope walking become, that one Sydney resident wrote to the Sydney Morning Herald to complain of "the Blondin business" that saw people walking on high wires wherever the opportunity arose. He noted that he had seen one walking on a wire in Liverpool Street in the city with a child strapped to his back. The practice which had become so popular was both dangerous and, the correspondent thought, likely to be unlawful, particularly in the risk of harming others. In reporting on the fall of a woman from a tightrope at an 1869 performance of Pablo Fanque's Circus in Bolton, the Illustrated London News described the tightrope walker, Madame Caroline, as a "female Blondin".

Two streets in Northfields, London, are named in his honour: Blondin Avenue and Niagara Avenue; they were formerly the site of part of Hugh Ronalds' renowned nursery. Blondin Park in the same area is also named after him.

During the run-up to the 1864 United States presidential election, Abraham Lincoln compared himself to "Blondin on the tightrope, with all that was valuable to America in the wheelbarrow he was pushing before him." A political cartoon in Frank Leslie's Budget of Fun took up this quotation on 1 September 1864 depicting Lincoln on a tightrope, pushing a wheelbarrow and carrying two men on his back—Navy Secretary Gideon Welles and War Secretary Edwin Stanton—while "John Bull", Napoleon III, Jefferson Davis (representing England, France, and the Confederacy, respectively), and Generals Grant, Lee and Sherman (representing the military) looked on, among others.

== See also ==
- Blondin (quarry equipment), a form of aerial ropeway used in Welsh quarries, and named after Charles Blondin, for the resemblance of its high cables to a tightrope.
