= Midland Sailing Club =

Sailing club in Birmingham

Sailing Club
- Burgee
- Short name: MSC
- Founded: 1894
- Location: Birmingham
- Commodore: Mark McKeever
- Focus: Dinghy Racing
- Website: www.midlandsailingclub.org.uk

Midland Sailing Club is an amateur sailing club, based at Birmingham in England. It is situated on Edgbaston Reservoir in the centre of Birmingham. The club was founded in 1894. It is an open sailing club for men, women, adults, and children of all abilities. The club actively tries to improve the diversity of the sailing population by engaging with the local community.

Midland Sailing Club is an RYA training centre, and courses for both beginners and more advanced sailors are run at regular intervals. Since 2019 this is done through SailBirmingham, an initiative to increase community engagement through watersports. Apart from regular junior training courses and RYA OnBoard sessions, this also includes Stand up paddleboarding. Members of the club take part both in the regular club races on Saturday afternoons and Wednesday evenings (during the summer months), and also in Open meetings across the country. The club regularly sends teams to the Southport 24 Hour Race.

== Burgee ==
The club burgee is the Swiss flag. This is a reference to the fact that the club was one of the earliest sailing clubs in England which is landlocked, so that it was jokingly compared to the Swiss navy. A letter from the Swiss embassy exists which allows the club to use the white cross on red background as its burgee.

== History ==
Midland Sailing Club was founded on 11 June 1894. Initially, boats hired from Salters of Oxford were used in racing, before the club in 1896 ordered seven boats from Mr Henry Holford of Gloucester.

There were three branches at the beginning, Edgbaston (sailing on Edgbaston Reservoir), Norton (sailing on "Norton Pool"), and Barnt Green (sailing on Upper Bittell Reservoir). This was partly due to lack of effective transport to sail at a central location at the time. The Edgbaston branch was the only one with a record of uninterrupted racing seasons from its foundation until the outbreak of the First World War.

During the war, racing was suspended, and the boats moored at the Norton branch were used as target practice by miners stationed there, who used to throw rocks into them until they sunk, effectively ending sailing there. As there was also no sailing at Barnt Green (until the foundation of Barnt Green Sailing Club in 1918), Midland Sailing Club decided at the AGM in February of 1919 to drop the "Edgbaston Branch" designation and continue as Midland Sailing Club from then onwards.

== Notable Members ==
- WH Ward, Earl of Dudley was the first club commodore in 1895.
- Neville Chamberlain was club commodore from 1921 to 1924.
