= Edgbaston Reservoir =

Reservoir in the West Midlands, England

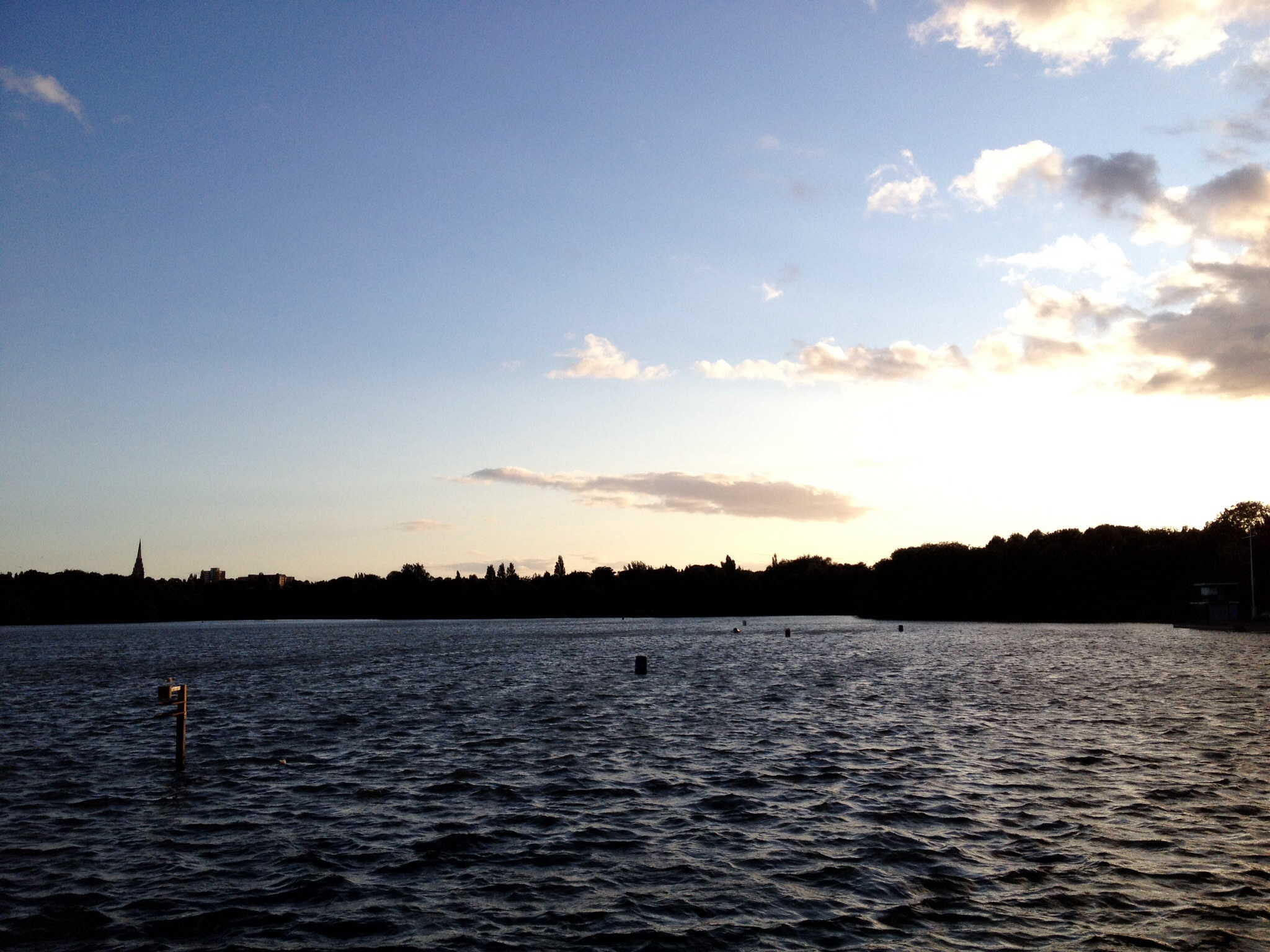
- The Reservoir in August 2014

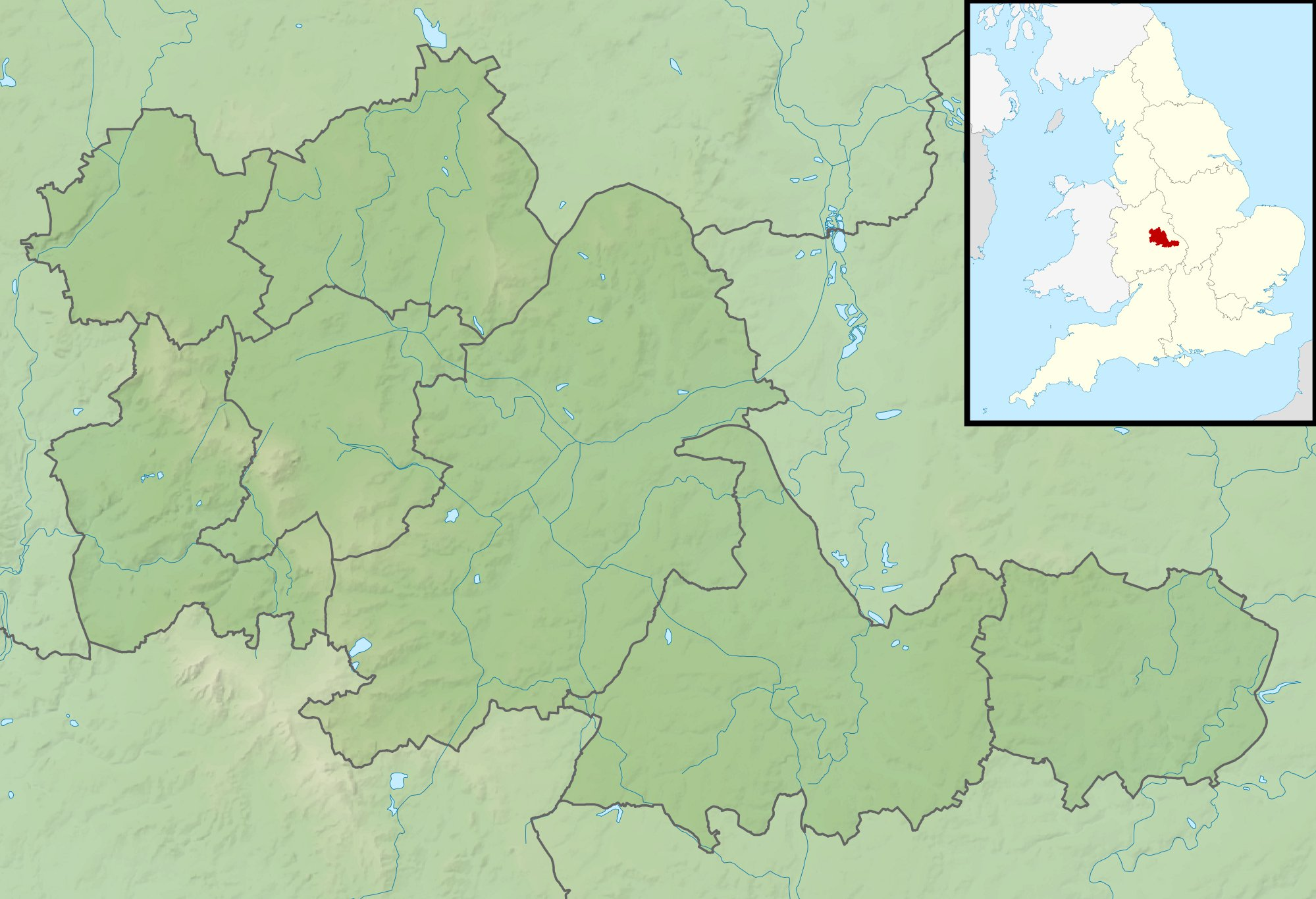
- Location within West Midlands county
- Location: Edgbaston, Birmingham, England
- Coordinates: 52°28′47.13″N 1°56′13.54″W
- Type: Reservoir
- Basin countries: United Kingdom
- Max. length: 800 metres (2,600 ft)
- Max. width: 550 metres (1,800 ft)
- Surface area: 58 acres (230,000 m^{2})
- Average depth: 5.90 metres (19.4 ft)
- Max. depth: 12 metres (40 ft)
- Water volume: 1,463,800 cubic metres (322,000,000 imp gal)
- Shore length^{1}: 2.5 kilometres (1.6 miles)
- ^{1} Shore length is not a well-defined measure.

Edgbaston Reservoir, originally known as Rotton Park Reservoir and referred to in some early maps as Rock Pool Reservoir, is a canal feeder reservoir in Birmingham, England, maintained by the Canal & River Trust. It is situated close to Birmingham City Centre and is a Site of Importance for Nature Conservation.

== History ==
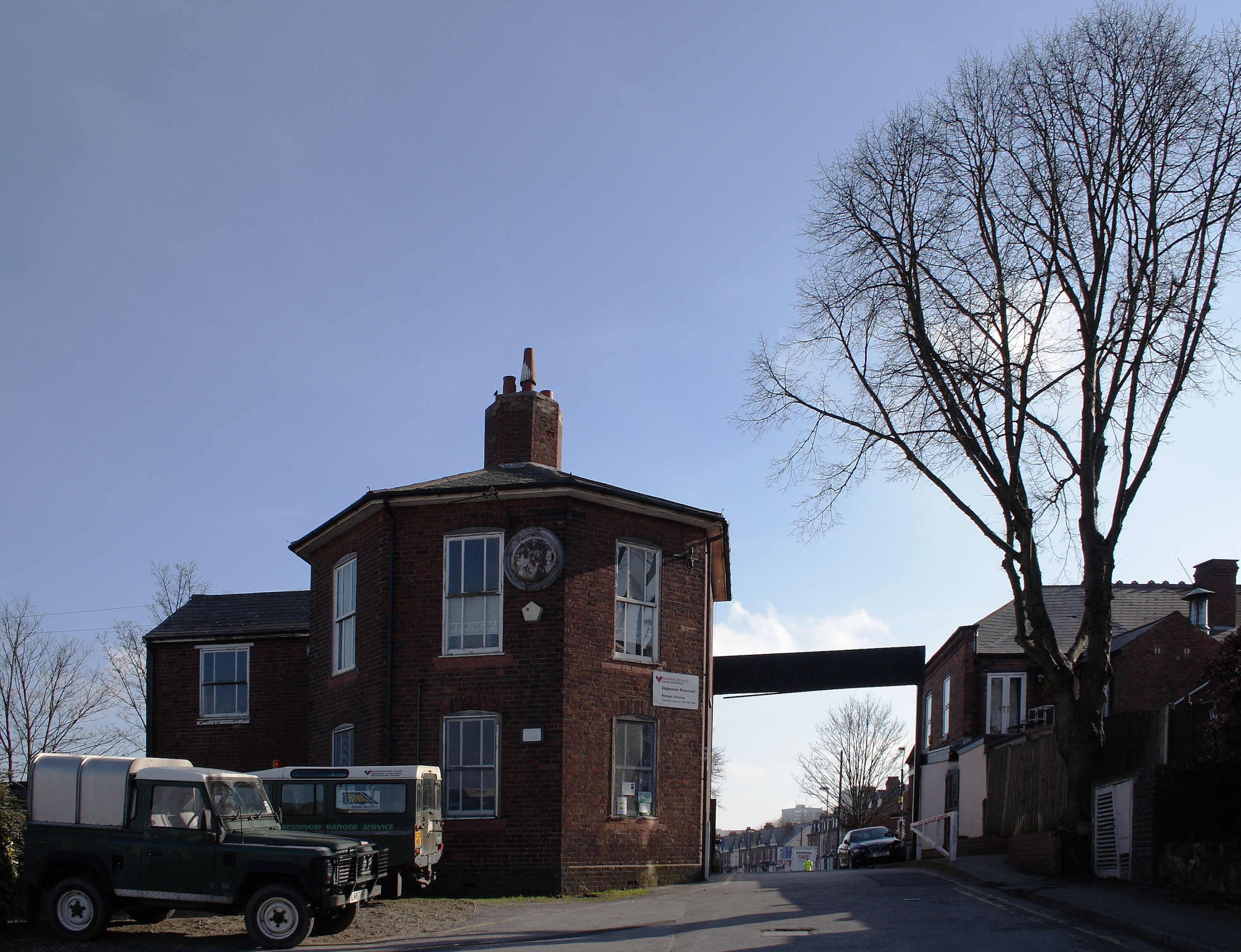
The gatehouse at the entrance to the reservoir

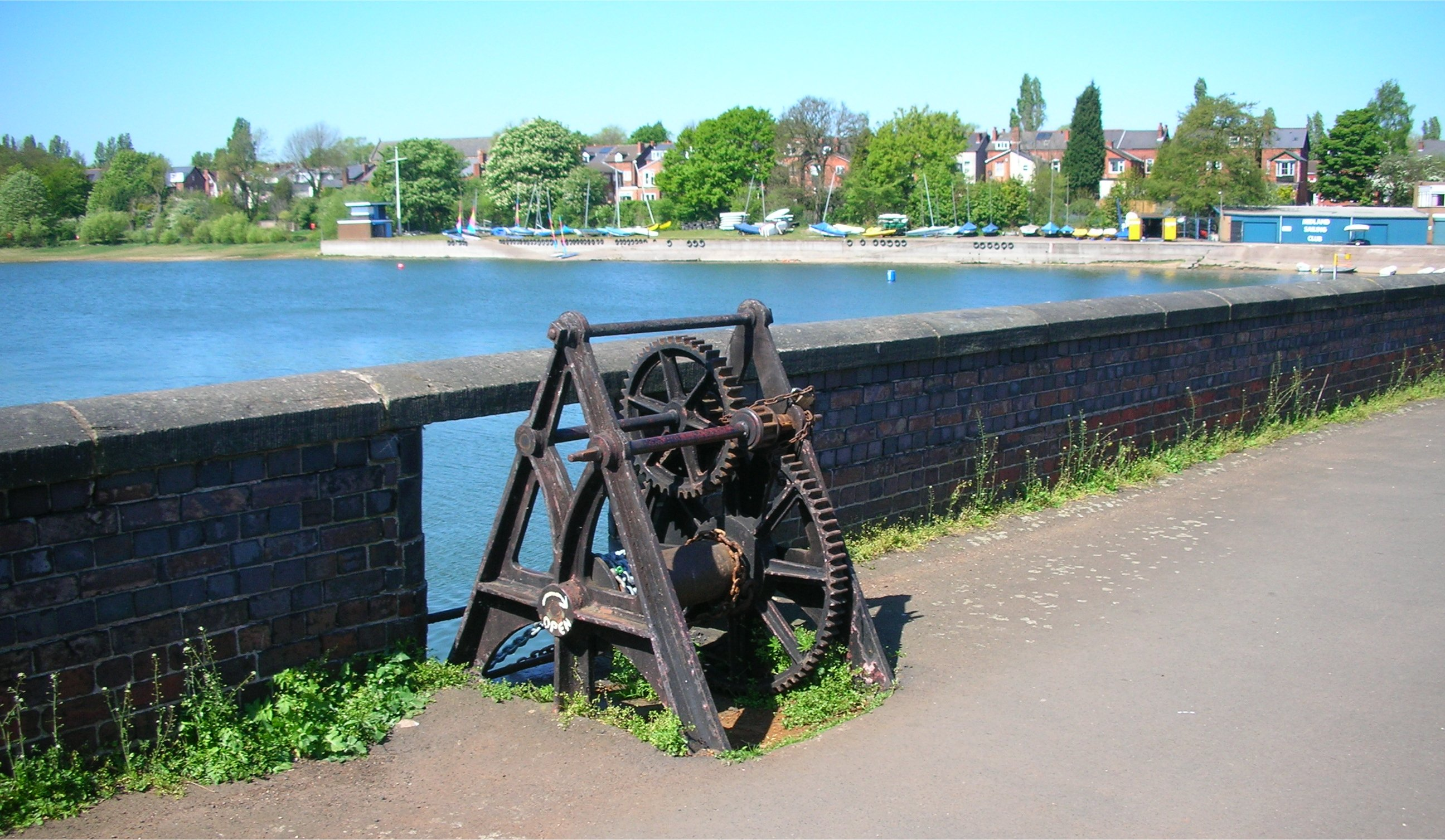
Boat house and Birmingham Level sluice gear on the dam

Originally a small pool named Roach Pool in Rotton Park, it was extensively enlarged by Thomas Telford between 1824 and 1829 to supply water to the Birmingham and Wolverhampton Levels of the Birmingham Canal Navigations (BCN) canal system: via a culvert and the Engine Arm to the Wolverhampton Level, and via Icknield Port Loop at the foot of the dam to the lower Birmingham Level.

It was excavated to a depth of 40 feet (12 metres) and covers an area of 58 acres (23 ha), holding 300 million imperial gallons (1,400 Ml) of water, and was the largest expanse of water in Birmingham at the time. It is supplied by small streams and a feeder from Titford Reservoir (Titford Pools) in Oldbury. It was formed by damming a small stream. The dam is a 1,080-foot (330 m) long earth embankment with a height of 33 feet (10 m) near the centre.

The reservoir and gatehouse were designed by Thomas Telford and the latter is a two-storey listed building in corporate BCN octagonal style, with a later extension dating from 1880. In 1873, the reservoir was crossed by Charles Blondin, on a tightrope. His feat is marked by a 1992 statue on the nearby Ladywood Middleway ring road.

In 1876, a skating rink was opened near the gatehouse. By the 1920s the building was more popular as a dance hall, and was renamed the 'Pavilion Ballroom', and then in 1933 the 'Tower Ballroom'. The Tower Ballroom remained open in some form until 2017, when it was forced to close due to rent costs. It reopened briefly in 2019 to host Birmingham Opera Company's acclaimed production of Lady Macbeth of Mtsenk, but was subsequently demolished in 2022 with the site remaining vacant as of 2024.

== Ecology ==
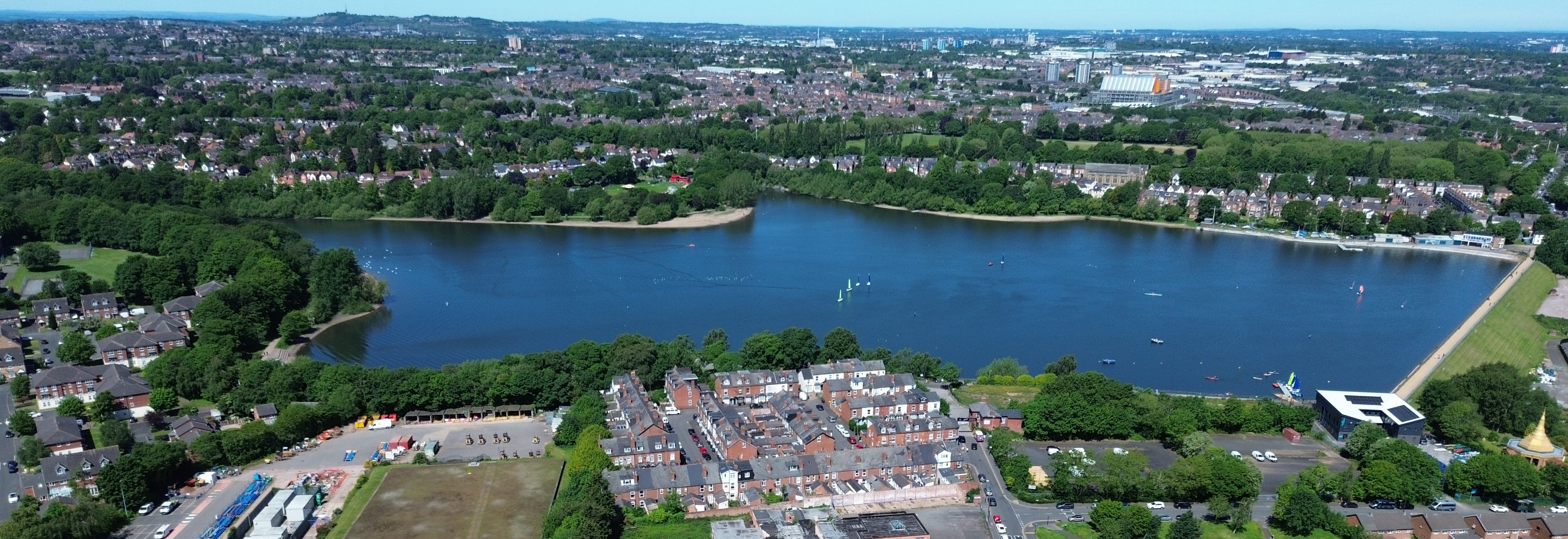
Aerial view of Edgbaston Reservoir in May 2026

The reservoir is surrounded by woodland and grassland. The total area of the site is 70 acres (280,000 m^{2}). It supports a variety of birds, in addition to newts and bats.

== Leisure ==
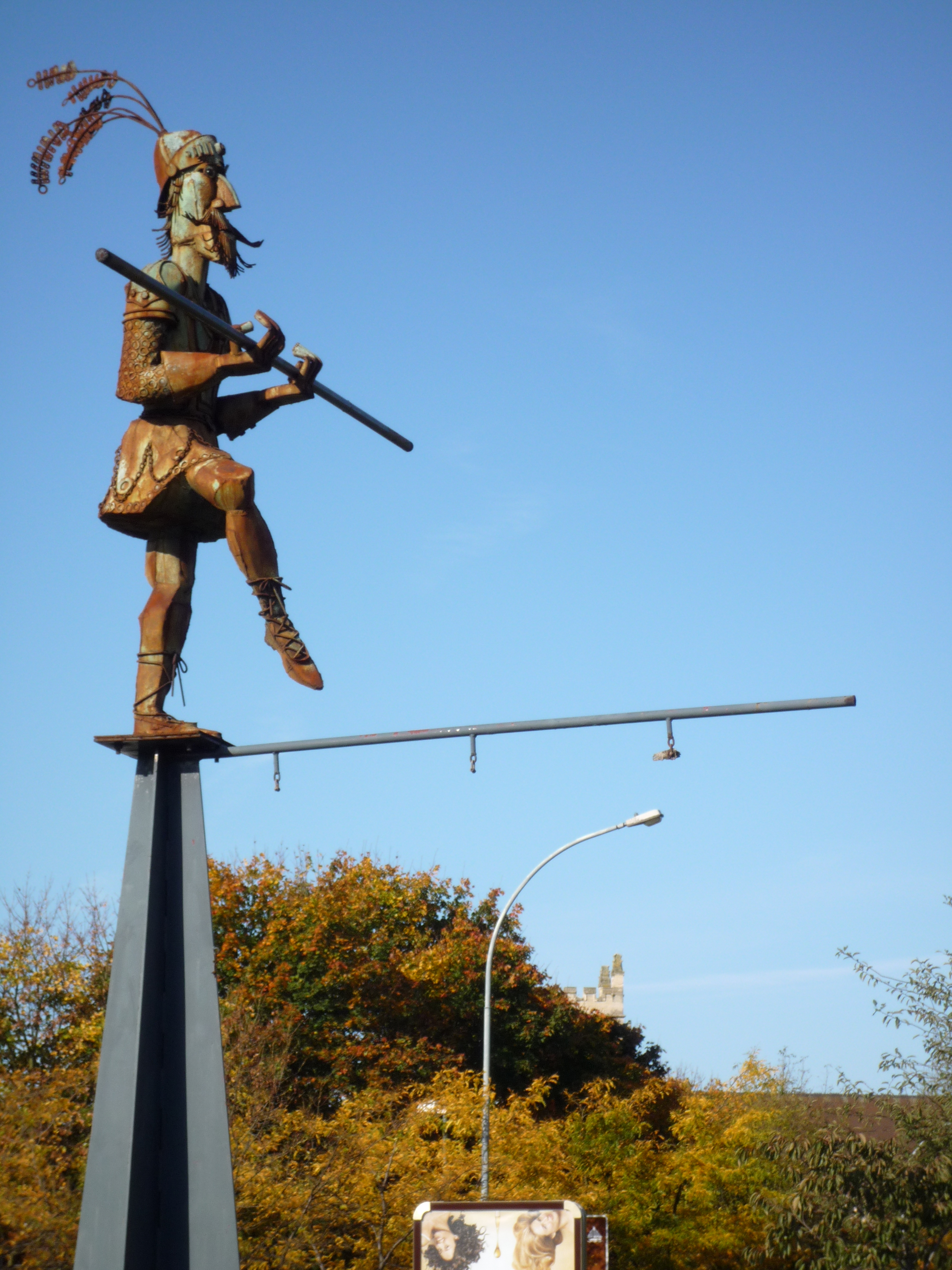
Sculpture of Charles Blondin

In addition to supplying water to the canals, the reservoir is used for leisure activities including angling, sailing, windsurfing, canoeing, kayaking and rowing.

Edgbaston Reservoir is home to three rowing clubs, Birmingham Rowing Club, Birmingham City University Rowing Club and the University of Birmingham Boat Club. All are housed within the same boathouse. The site has also been chosen to house a new Birmingham Schools rowing initiative, with the three aforementioned clubs assisting in the running of the scheme. Birmingham Canoe Club also shares the space during the summer months (June to September), paddling on the reservoir.

TS Vernon Sea Cadets use the reservoir as a base, their current site is being redeveloped in 2023 by the parent charity the MSSC (Marine Society & Sea Cadets) to become Midland Boat Station which will provide opportunities not only to Cadets in the immediate area and beyond but will provide opportunities for schools, Further Education and youth groups access to water sports under professional and Adventure Activity licensed Instruction at their brand new purpose built facility which will be completed early 2024.

The Midland Sailing Club is also based at Edgbaston Reservoir, and often race sailing boats around a marked course. Windsurfers also use the reservoir.

Until 2017 the Reservoir was home to Edgbaston Watersports, which provided water and land activities for school, college and youth groups from their base on the Icknield Port Road side of the reservoir. Since 2019 such water sports activities are provided by SailBirmingham.

The Reservoir perimeter provides a pleasant route for joggers, with a gravel and tarmac path throughout its 1.75 mile (2.8 km) circumference.

The fishing season runs from 16 June to 14 March. Licences are available from the Environment Agency.

As of April 2019 the car park is closed to vehicles after complaints of antisocial behaviour.

Since August 2021, Edgbaston Reservoir has been hosted a weekly parkrun. The route covers two laps of the reservoir and takes place at 9am each Saturday.

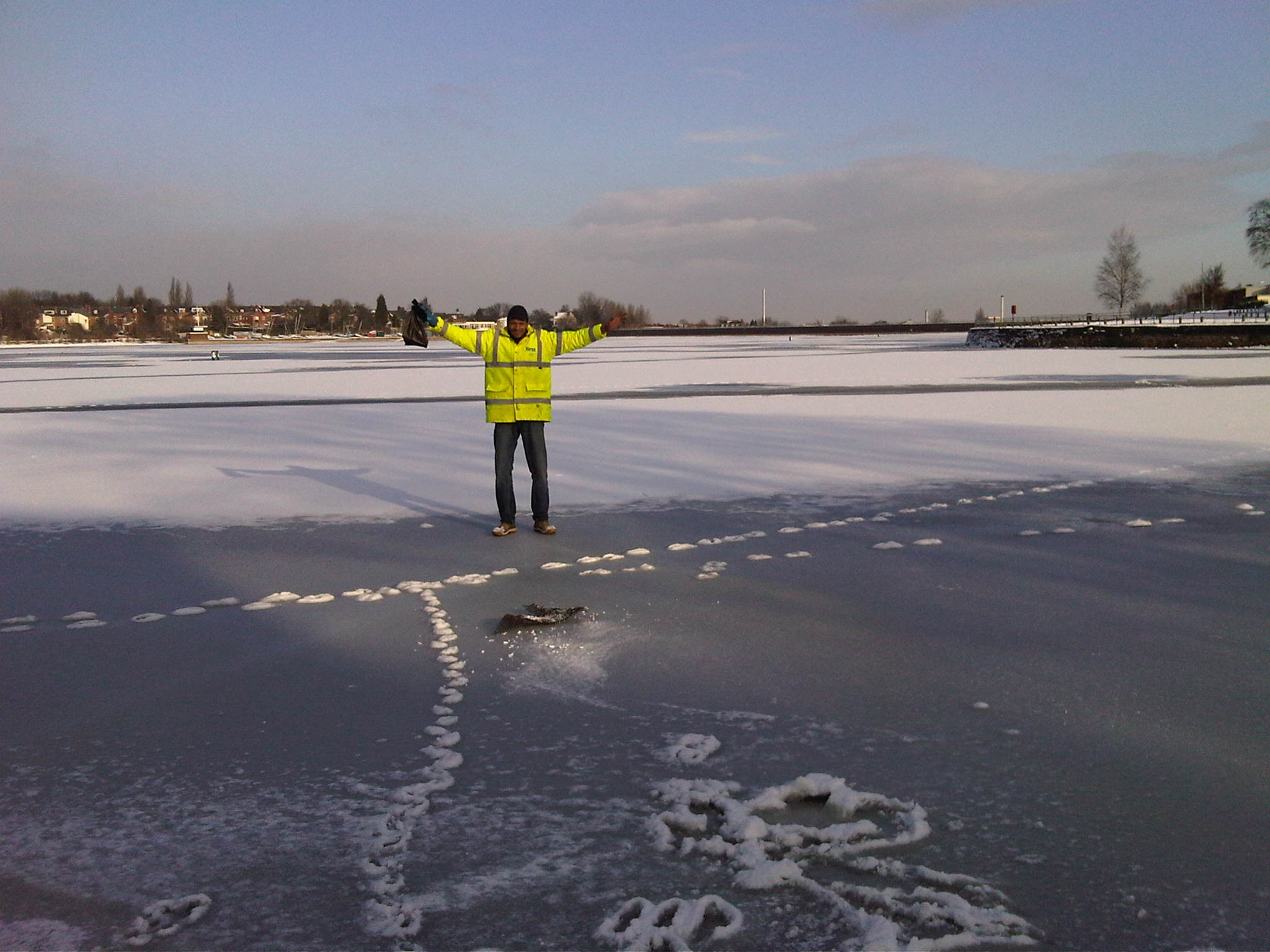
Man standing on the frozen Reservoir in January 2010

== Weather ==
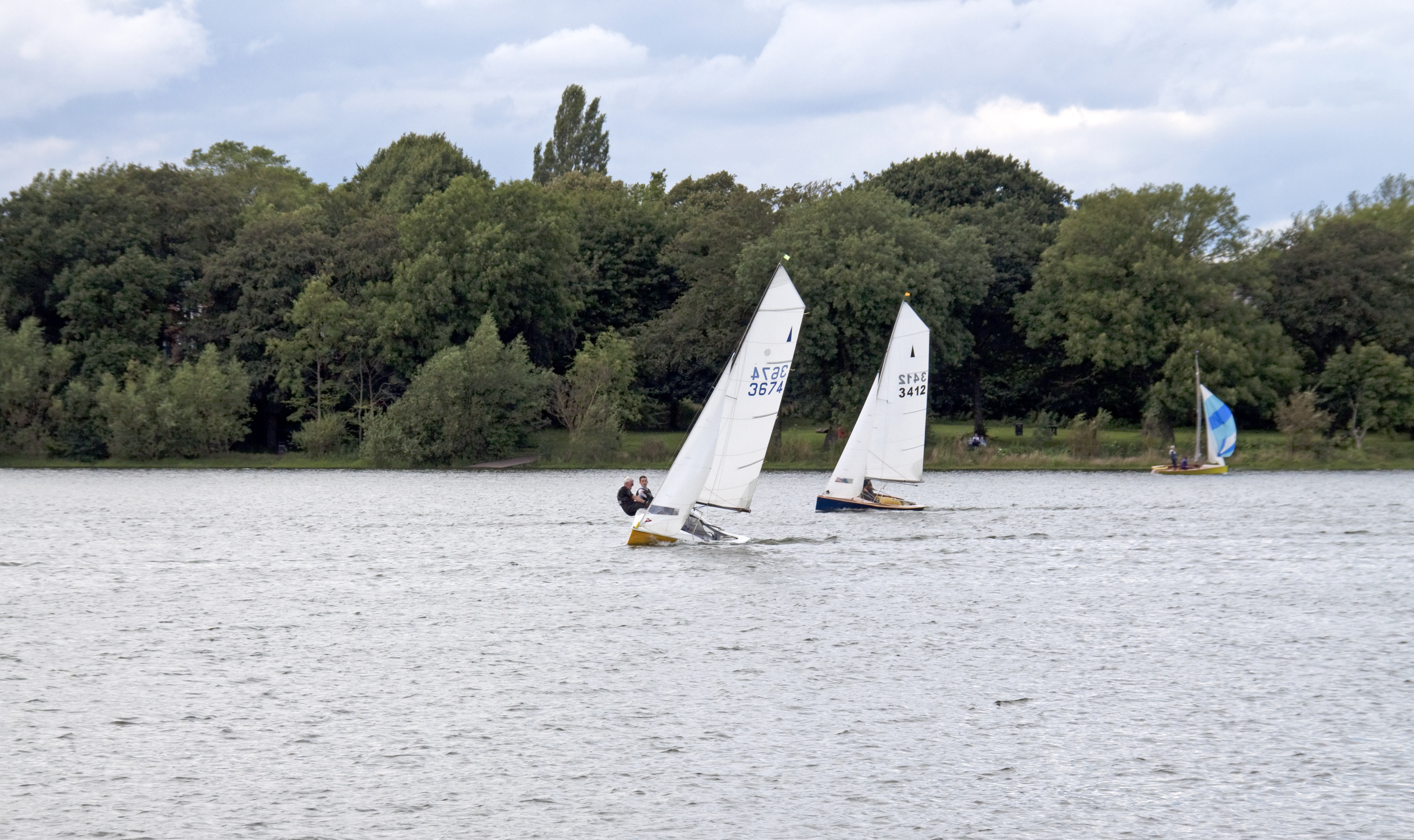
Sailors on the Reservoir

The reservoir usually has a gentle breeze across it due to the lack of large buildings or objects surrounding it, which makes it ideal for sailing.

During winter there can be strong, icy, northerly winds blowing over the city, which can freeze the reservoir over due to its exposed northern side (where the dam is situated). In both January 2009 and 2010 reservoir froze over to the extent that it could be walked upon, although this is strongly discouraged.

In the summer the reservoir is often extremely busy with members of the public coming for picnics and walks around the reservoir's perimeter path.

== See also ==
- Lifford Reservoir
- Wychall Reservoir
- Bartley Reservoir
