= Lifford Reservoir =

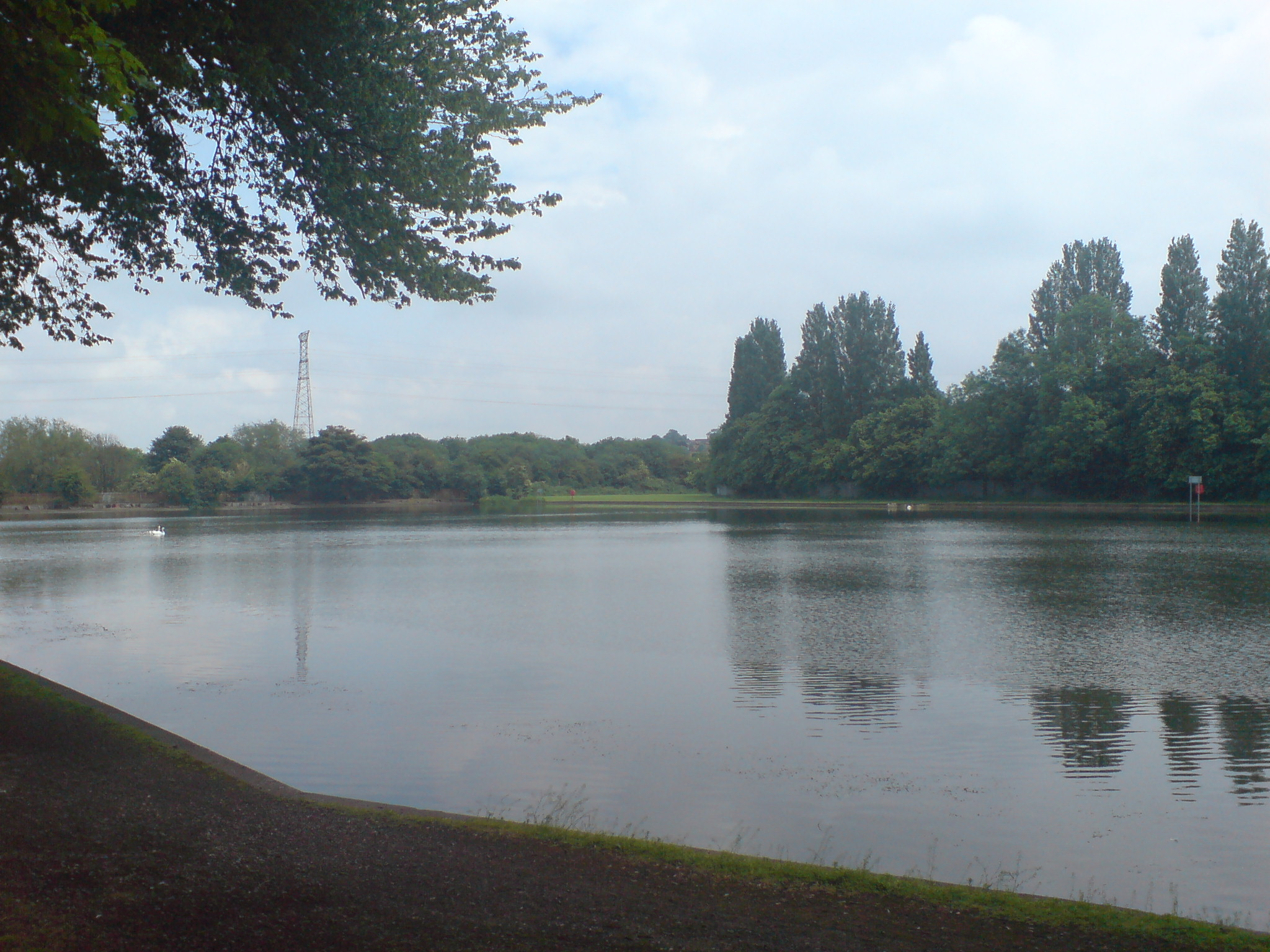
- Northeast view

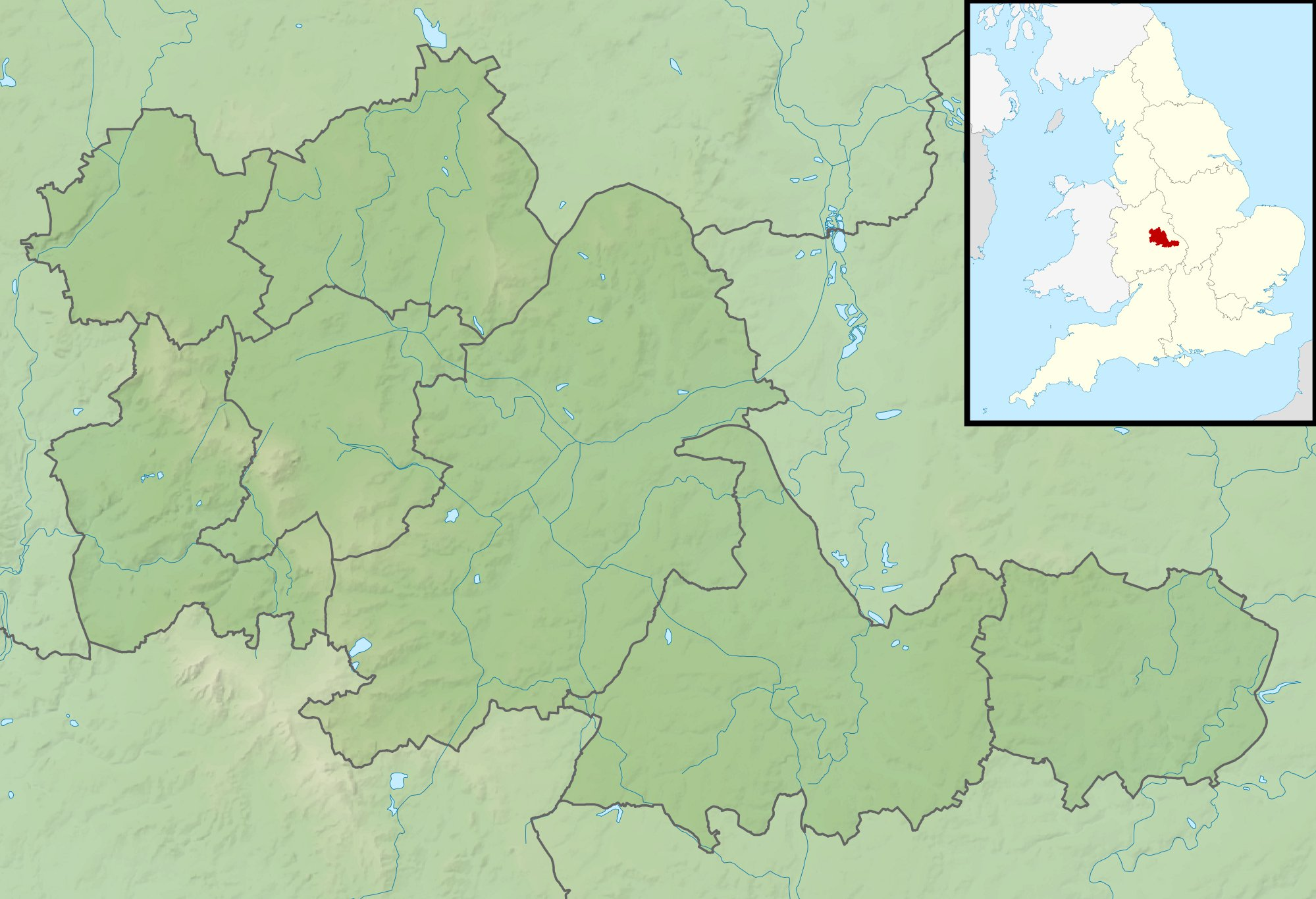
- Location within West Midlands county
- Location: Birmingham, England
- Coordinates: 52.41679°N 1.91614°W
- Type: reservoir
- Basin countries: United Kingdom
- Water volume: 68,190 m^{3} (89,190 cu yd)

Lifford Reservoir shown within the West Midlands (grid reference SP058797)

Lifford Reservoir in the Kings Norton district of Birmingham, England was built by the Worcester & Birmingham Canal company in 1815 to compensate Lifford Mill for water lost to the canal. It is located at the junction of the Stratford-upon-Avon Canal and the Worcester and Birmingham Canal and is on the River Rea Cycle Route. Angling is permitted subject to a charge outside the spring close season. Fish in the reservoir include tench, carp, pike, eels, perch, roach and bream.

Its capacity is 68,190 m^{3} (89,190 cu yd), retained by an earthfill dam.

== See also ==
- Edgbaston Reservoir
- Wychall Reservoir
- River Rea
