= Stephen Hotter =

New Zealand cricketer and netball coach

Personal information
- Full name: Stephen John Hotter
- Born: 2 December 1969 (age 56); New Plymouth, New Zealand
- Batting: Right-handed
- Bowling: Left-arm fast-medium
- Role: Bowler

Domestic team information
- Years: Team
- 1988/89–1999/2000: Wellington

Career statistics
Competition	First-class	List A
Matches	24	17
Runs scored	240	21
Batting average	9.23	4.20
100s/50s	0/0	0/0
Top score	33	5*
Balls bowled	4042	780
Wickets	70	17
Bowling average	29.25	33.88
5 wickets in innings	4	0
10 wickets in match	1	n/a
Best bowling	6/69	3/31
Catches/stumpings	9/–	6/–
- Source: Cricinfo, 24 June 2023

Stephen John Hotter (born 2 December 1969) is a New Zealand cricketer and netball coach. He played in 24 first-class and 17 List A matches for Wellington between 1989 and 2000.

A left-arm fast-medium bowler, Hotter took a wicket with his first delivery in first-class cricket when he dismissed Ken Rutherford of Otago on 19 January 1989. He was only the second New Zealander, after Raymond Strange in January 1902, to perform this feat.

Hotter's most successful first-class season was 1996–97, when he took 30 wickets at an average of 21.36. During the season he took his best innings figures of 6 for 69 against Otago, and his best match figures of 11 for 125 against Northern Districts.

Since his playing days ended, Hotter has had a career in sports coaching. He was the lead strength and conditioning specialist for the New Zealand national netball team from 2012 to 2020, and Netball New Zealand appointed him head of high performance in 2023.
