= Tower Ballroom, Birmingham =

The Tower Ballroom was an attraction in Birmingham, West Midlands, England, which opened to the public in March 1876 and closed permanently in 2017. It was demolished in 2022 with the site remaining vacant as of 2024. It was located beside Edgbaston Reservoir. Across its history, The Tower Ballroom hosted a wide variety of events, including roller-skating and ice-skating, dancing, discos, weddings, boxing matches, theatre, and musical performances including The Smiths and New Order.

== Background ==
Beginning in 1824, Thomas Telford significantly enlarged Roach Pool in order to maintain a constant water supply to the West Midlands’ new canals, creating Edgbaston Reservoir. The reservoir was initially located in open land, but from 1850 onwards the surrounding area became increasingly urbanized, first to the south and east. The creation of the Harborne Railway in 1874 largely cut off the reservoir from the fields to the north.

In 1870, the canal company leased 62 acres of land around the reservoir to William Wyatt, a boatbuilder from Oxfordshire, who converted it into pleasure gardens, including refreshment rooms, a boat house with 500 boats for hire, flower beds, and regular entertainment.

The Reservoir is now considered a Site of Importance for Nature Conservation. Its gatehouse is a listed building.

== History ==
Wyatt began construction of a concrete building with a single span roof to serve as a roller-skating rink to the east of the refreshment rooms and boathouse in 1875. This rink was 75 yards long and 20 yards wide, totalling 14,600 square feet. It was advertised as "largest covered skating rink in the Kingdom". Constructions cost £5600, including £700 for a Val de Travers (asphalt) floor. The rink paid £400 for the right to use Plimpton's skates (a type of quad skate patented in 1863), plus 20 shillings per each pair.

The rink opened for the first time in March 1876. A band was hired to play music every evening, and Monday and Saturday afternoons. However, it was only briefly profitable, and Wyatt went bankrupt in 1878. Three years before Wyatt's death, in 1882, the entertainment license for the pleasure gardens was transferred to F.H. Miller, who laid a new floor and announced that the building would be used primarily for dancing during the holidays. After this, it was regularly used to host entertainments such as concerts, especially when bad weather meant that planned outdoor events were cancelled.

In 1909, the building was refurbished by its lessees, J.H. Salter, J.E. Salter, and G.S. Salter, and manager, F. A. Millin. The ironwork was carried out by E.C.& J. Keay Ltd, and the Birmingham Canal Company was responsible for the rest of the building work. The style of the rink was updated, including a maple floor (so that skaters would not have to ‘cross the boards’ at any time), a café, a cloakroom, 90 feet of windows facing the reservoir, and the engagement of a permanent orchestra. It reopened on 2 March 1909. In 1911, a further ‘number of improvements’ were made; the building was again ‘entirely redecorated’.

During the First World War, the rink was used for drilling and as a miniature rifle range by the Warwickshire Volunteer Regiment, 4th Division ‘C’ Company. It remained open to the public when not in use by the Home Guard. In 1916, the Salter brothers created the Edgbaston Reservoir Company Ltd, to "take over the business of providers and promoters of amusements, entertainments and sports".

Although it was still primarily a skating rink, the building became increasingly popular as a dance hall. In 1925 it was named the Pavilion Ballroom; sessions were held most evenings after the rink closed.

Plans were announced in 1930 to convert the ballroom into what would then have been the second-largest covered ice rink in the world. However, no evidence can be found that this ever took place, and dancing and roller-skating continued. It is possible that this confusion was related to a new ice rink on Summer Hill Road in Birmingham announced the same year.

In 1932, a ‘Blackpool Week’ was held by the Birmingham Sporting Club on the pleasure grounds to raise money for the Children's Hospital, including a replica of Blackpool Tower. The next year, the Sporting Club acquired possession of the building, and renamed it after Blackpool's Tower Ballroom, possibly in reference to the nearby Waterworks tower. In honour of the new name, Alderman T. Fenton, the mayor of Blackpool, opened the Sporting Club's fourth annual charity ball there on 13 February 1933. Blackpool Week was repeated in 1933, but cancelled the next year after complaints of noise and drunken behaviour.

By 1934, although some skating still took place, the facility had spent £4000 improving the ballroom for dancing, and was now primarily an entertainment venue and dance hall. Boxing matches were also regularly held in the ballroom; rowdy crowds attending these events caused some licensing issues.

The Edgbaston Reservoir Company was succeeded by a company named Galaland, which formed and held the lease of the Tower and pleasure grounds from 1934, but liquidated in 1937. Galaland, the lease of the reservoir, and its grounds were advertised for sale in 1938 for £600 a year. In December of that year, the ballroom was also used as a temporary sorting depot for the Post Office to deal with huge volumes of Christmas mail.

Following the outbreak of the Second World War in 1939, Galaland announced that it would remain open. However, the ballroom was not promoted for dancing after 1941, and it is likely that it closed due to wartime conditions.

In 1944, Butlins took over the lease of the reservoir and grounds. As it was still unable to open properly because of the war, the building was used as a storage depot, although the gardens were open to the public. It is possible that redecoration prior to its November 1947 reopening involved repairs to damage from air raids, although there is no information available to confirm this.

After 1948, Butlins' name was no longer attached to the site, and it is unclear who subsequently managed the grounds and ballroom. In 1956, the reservoir and surrounding land was purchased from the Docks and Inland Waterways Executive by Birmingham City Council, which then privately leased out the Tower Ballroom. More than £14,000 was spent on "essential works" at the reservoir, converting it into a boating and sports centre.

On 1 January 1960, operation of the Tower Ballroom was taken over by the Parks Department of the Birmingham Corporation, which spent over £20,000 renovating the ballroom. However, attendance fell to fewer than 180 guests (well under the ballroom's 1500 capacity), and the Corporation lost £18,000 in 1961 alone.

In 1962, the site was leased to Mecca Limited, which intended to use the ballroom for music and bingo in addition to dancing, and announced that they planned to spend £55,000 on improvements and extensions. The building was renamed the Gay Tower Ballroom and reopened in 1963 with a charity cocktail party and dance; at this event, it was announced that a further £250,000 would be devoted to the ‘reconstruction of the old Tower Ballroom’.

The building continued to host boxing, music, and dancing events across the next two decades. By the late 1970s, it was again known as just the Tower Ballroom.

A planned £1,000,000 refurbishment to include a nightclub, pub, and upmarket restaurant was delayed when in 1988 the building became the location for the third series of the television series Boon, and seemingly never took place. In 1991, planning permission was granted to build a hotel on the site, which also never happened.

Following their 1989 acquisition of Mecca Leisure Group, the Rank Organisation extended the building to include a beer store in 1993, in addition to being given permission to widen Birmingham Council's public footpath, and add lighting and a mirror for security purposes.

In 2005, plans were submitted to close the Tower Ballroom and build 40 homes, 50 apartments, and a café on the site. A "Last Dance" event was held on 15 December 2005 to commemorate it. However, following a successful campaign to save the building, Birmingham City Council refused to change the use of land, and the planned demolition was never carried out. The building reopened on 3 April 2008 as just "The Tower".

In 2009, Balinder Sangha announced plans to spend £1,000,000 on renovating the building as a venue for large South Asian weddings. In 2014, the building's owners were fined £1,870 for playing copyrighted music without a licence.

The Tower closed in 2017, as its owner was unable to pay rent to the council, but briefly reopened in 2019 to host Birmingham Opera Company's award-winning production of Dmitri Shostakovich's opera Lady Macbeth of Mtsensk. For this, it was "artfully trashed" by artists and set designers Block9.

In November 2022 work began to demolish The Tower Ballroom. Despite a campaign to save The Tower and make it a listed building, plans have been put forward to build up to 3,000 new houses on the site. As of 2024 the site remains vacant.

== Legacy ==
Bertz Associates, an arts and cultural association based in North-West Birmingham, has organised a number of projects focused on the Tower Ballroom. This includes Dreaming Tower Ballroom, which collects personal histories of the Tower and dreams of its potential futures, and an upcoming short film.
