= Wychall Reservoir =

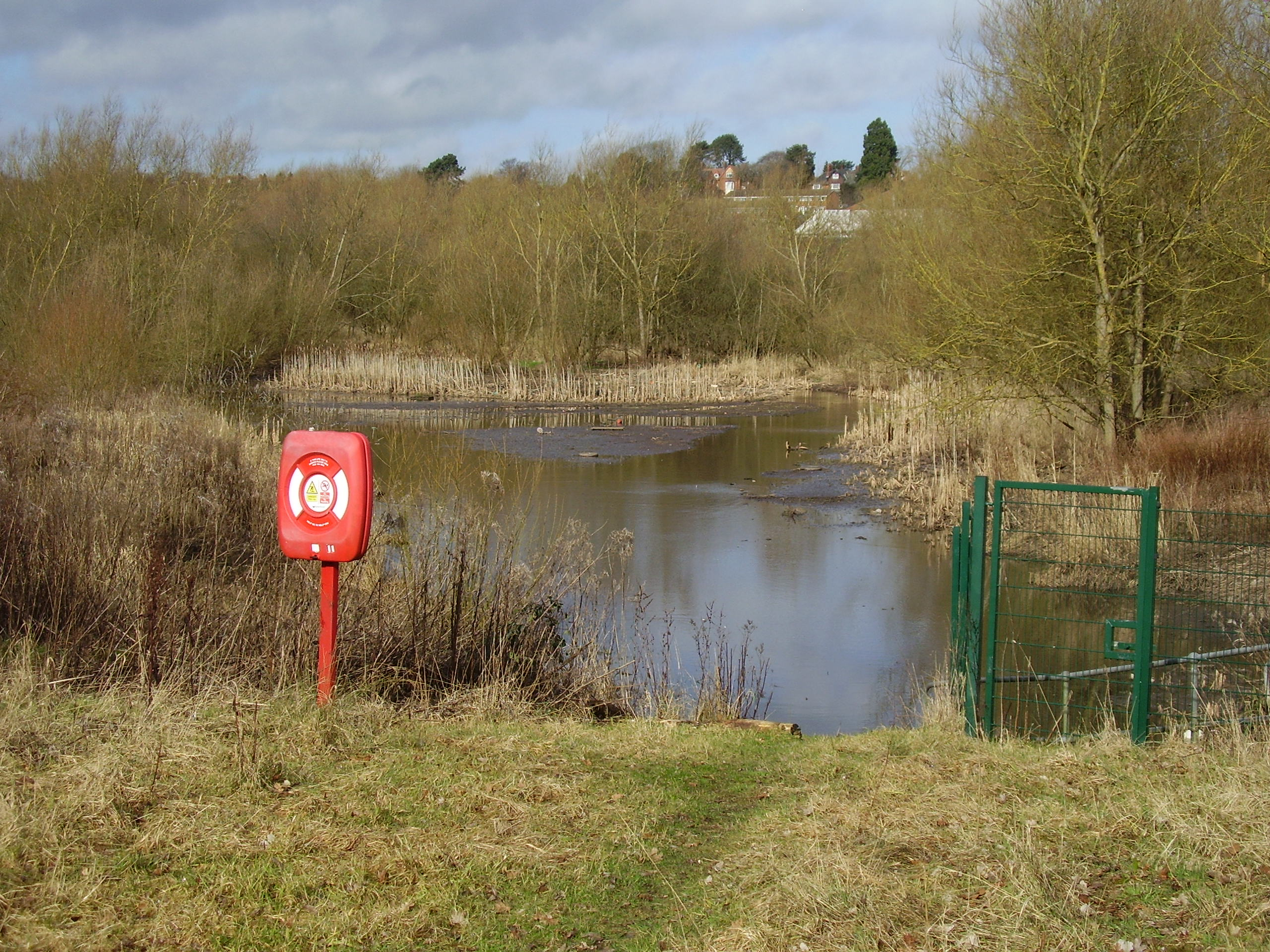
- Wychall Reservoir today

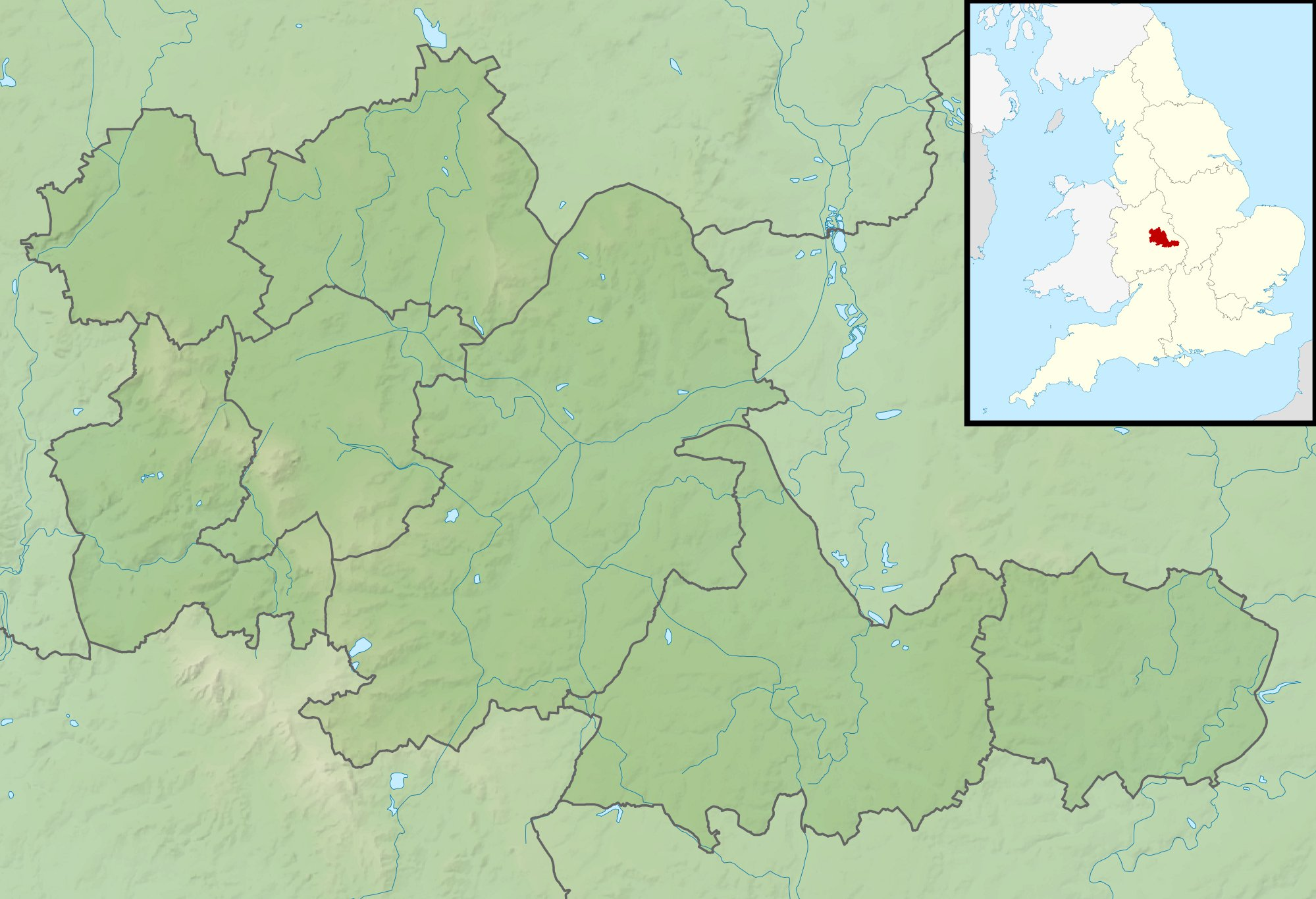
- Location within West Midlands county
- Location: Birmingham
- Coordinates: 52.4108°N 1.9446°W
- Type: reservoir
- Basin countries: United Kingdom

Wychall Reservoir shown within the West Midlands (grid reference SP038791)

Wychall Reservoir, is a canal compensation reservoir in the Kings Norton district of Birmingham, England.

It was built in the early 19th century by the Worcester Canal Company, after mill owners claimed that water was being taken from the River Rea to fill the canal, thereby reducing the working effectiveness of their mills.

Now defunct as a reservoir it has been adopted by Birmingham City Council, along with the nearby Merecroft Pool, as a Local Nature Reserve. A low level of water is maintained with the drained area a combination of meadow, woodland and reedbed.

== See also ==
- Edgbaston Reservoir
- Lifford Reservoir
