= Thomas Strange =

Thomas Strange may refer to:

- Thomas Andrew Lumisden Strange (1756–1841), British judge in India and Canada
- Thomas Bland Strange (1831–1925), British major-general
- Thomas Hugo Strange, a fictional character ('Doc Strange')
- Thomas Lumisden Strange (1808–1884), English judge and writer
- Thomas Strange (MP for Cirencester)
- Thomas Strange (MP for Northamptonshire) (died 1436), MP for Northamptonshire
- Thomas Lestrange (1518–1590) also called Thomas Strange, English civil and military administrator in Ireland
