= John Strange =

John Strange may refer to:

- John Strange (MP for Suffolk and Norfolk) (c.1347-1417), English MP for Suffolk and Norfolk
- John Strange (Canadian politician) (1788–1840), Scottish-born Canadian merchant and politician
- John Strange (Wisconsin politician) (1852–1923), former Lieutenant Governor of Wisconsin
- Sir John Strange (English politician) (1696–1754), English barrister, MP for Totnes and West Looe, and master of the rolls
- John Strange (diplomat) (1732–1799), son of the above; natural philosopher and diplomat
- Johnny Strange, sideshow and freak show performance artist
- Johnny Strange (adventurer) (1991–2015)

== See also ==
- Jonathan Strange & Mr Norrell, novel
