= Larry L'Estrange =

British soldier and rugby player

Larry L'Estrange MBE TD
- Born: Laurence Percy Farrer L'Estrange; 12 November 1934; Lytham St Annes, Lancashire, United Kingdom
- Died: 29 March 2007 (aged 72); Condom, Gers, France
- Education: Trinity College Dublin
- Occupation: Rugby player
- Spouses: Marian L'Estrange; Beulah L'Estrange
- Children: Fiona Anne Kathleen
- Relatives: Laurence L'Estrange (father)

Larry L'Estrange MBE TD (12 November 1934 – 29 March 2007) was a British paratrooper and rugby player.

The son of British diplomat Laurence L'Estrange, Ambassador of the United Kingdom to Honduras from 1969 to 1972, L'Estrange was born in Lytham St Annes in 1934 and was educated at Blackrock College, Dublin; the University of Chicago; and the Sorbonne in Paris.

L'Estrange initially joined the Royal Marines in 1955 for his National Service at Eaton Hall, Cheshire, but an issue with officer manning levels within the Marines meant that he did not return. Instead, L'Estrange joined the Durham Light Infantry and volunteered for the Parachute Regiment. He was posted to 3 PARA where he served during the Cyprus Emergency.

During the Suez Crisis, L'Estrange was selected to be an operational aide-de-camp to Brigadier Mervyn Butler of the 16th Parachute Brigade. He was not involved in the airborne assault but rather went in by sea with 2 PARA. After completing National Service, L'Estrange maintained his association with the Parachute Regiment through his service with the Territorial Army, predominantly in 10 PARA. He served for 25 years. In 1972, he was awarded the Member of the British Empire in the 1972 Birthday Honours for his military services.

After his military career, L'Estrange played for London Irish, where he was awarded the 1963–64 Backs' Honours tie. He also made appearances for Sussex and the Territorial Army. He was capped once for Ireland in 1962, against England at Twickenham, where he was one of nine debutants. L'Estrange was said to have had a 'ghastly' game after suffering broken fingers early in the match without being able to be replaced.

In 1984, he made the news when he was mistakenly barred from entering Greece because he had a Turkish North Cyprus visa in his passport. After protesting to the Greek Embassy in London, he was given a full apology plus a return plane ticket and two weeks holiday in Greece gratis L'Estrange was a partner at Tustain and L'Estrange, Stockbrokers in the City of London and later became an insurance broker, working at Thorman Hunt & Co, in Bow, London.

L'Estrange died on 29 March 2007 after being hospitalized for a broken hip in Condom, Gers, France, aged 72.
