= Laurence L'Estrange =

British diplomat (1912–1990)

Laurence L'Estrange OBE FRSA

9th United Kingdom Ambassador to Honduras
- In office 9 May 1969 – 1972
- Preceded by: John Wright
- Succeeded by: David M. Pearson

Personal details
- Born: 10 September 1912 First Republic of Costa Rica
- Died: 18 August 1990 (aged 77) London, England, United Kingdom
- Children: Larry; John
- Profession: Diplomat

Laurence Percy Farrar L'Estrange OBE FRSA (10 September 1912 – 18 August 1990) was a British diplomat who served as the United Kingdom’s Ambassador to Honduras from 1969 to 1972.

L'Estrange was ambassador in Tegucigalpa, capital of Honduras, during the 1969 Football War between Honduras and El Salvador. L'Estrange also held various consular and diplomatic appointments, including in Manila, Philippines, and Denver, Colorado.

== Early life ==
L'Estrange was born on 10 September 1912 in Costa Rica to William Samuel (1877–1956) and Louisa Knights Farrer. William had been born in Etah, British Raj and Farrer was born in Guadalupe, Costa Rica. L'Estrange was educated at Shoreham Grammar School and the University of London.

L'Estrange married Anne Catherine Whiteside in 1935 in Caracas, Venezuela. They had two sons, Larry (1934–2007) and John (1937–2022), born in England and Venezuela respectively. Larry L'Estrange was a distinguished British paratrooper and later became a professional rugby player, capped for Ireland.

== Diplomatic career ==
L'Estrange began his diplomatic career at the British Embassy in Caracas, Venezuela, in 1939, where he served as Acting Vice-Consul in 1941 and 1942. He resigned and joined the Royal Air Force, serving from 1943 to 1946. L'Estrange rejoined the His Majesty's Diplomatic Service in 1946 serving as Vice-Consul in Málaga, Spain, and Second Secretary in San Salvador in 1949.

By the early 1950s, Laurence L'Estrange was assigned to the United States. He was appointed Chargé d'Affaires in 1952 and later Vice-Consul in Chicago in January 1953, a role that placed him in charge of British consular affairs for a broad Midwestern region (covering numerous Illinois counties, as well as parts of neighbouring states).

After a year in Chicago, L'Estrange was appointed First Secretary (Commercial) in Manila and was instrumental in promoting British trade interests in the Philippines. In the Queen’s Birthday Honours of 1958, L'Estrange was appointed an Officer of the Order of the British Empire (OBE) in recognition of his diplomatic service. This award highlighted his contributions during the Manila posting and solidified his standing within the Foreign Service. L'Estrange later served as First Secretary (Commercial) in Lima, Peru, in 1958 and later Chargé d'Affaires in 1961. He was seconded to the Western Hemisphere Exports Council, where he led the Latin American division in 1962.

=== Consul in Denver (1964–1968) ===
In 1963, Laurence L'Estrange was appointed Her Majesty’s Consul at Denver, Colorado, heading the British Consulate that served the Rocky Mountain region of the U.S. This posting involved representing British economic and consular interests in several western states (Colorado, Utah, Wyoming, New Mexico, and others). L'Estrange's appointment as Consul was part of a broader reshuffle of diplomatic personnel announced in the London Gazette in mid-1964.

As Consul, L'Estrange engaged with state and city officials, business communities, and educational groups to promote UK–U.S. ties in the region. He handled consular protection issues for British nationals in the area and facilitated trade links (such as British investments or exports in the Mountain West). This mid-career posting in Colorado exemplified L'Estrange's broad overseas service beyond Latin America, and it earned him a measure of local recognition. Newspapers in the western states occasionally featured Consul L'Estrange's perspectives. For example, in early 1966 he spoke at a Sheridan College convocation about British maritime trade routes in the Pacific. In December 1966, L'Estrange was transferred from the consulate position to Counsellor (Commercial) in Lagos, Nigeria in 1967.

=== Ambassador to Honduras (1969–1972) ===
Laurence L'Estrange was formally appointed British Ambassador to Honduras in the spring of 1969. According to the official notice in the London Gazette, his appointment as “Ambassador Extraordinary and Plenipotentiary at Tegucigalpa” took effect on 30 April 1969. He succeeded Ambassador John H. Wright CBE and became the ninth head of the UK mission in Honduras since diplomatic relations were established. At the time of L'Estrange's arrival, Honduras was under the military government of General Oswaldo López Arellano, and Central America was entering a period of heightened tensions.

Soon after L'Estrange assumed his ambassadorship, a brief but significant conflict erupted between Honduras and its neighbour El Salvador, known as the "Football War" of July 1969. This four-day war (14–18 July 1969) was sparked by political and social disputes, which were exacerbated by rioting during FIFA World Cup qualifying football matches between the two countries. L'Estrange initially reported that "there was no trouble" and that the conflict emerged simply because Honduras won "though by the skin of their teeth."

=== Later life ===
L'Estrange was made a Fellow of the Royal Society of Arts in 1973. He died in London on 18 August 1990, aged 77.
