= Raymond Strange =

New Zealand cricketer

Personal information
- Full name: Raymond Brackley Strange
- Born: 27 October 1878; Christchurch, New Zealand
- Died: 17 September 1962 (aged 83); Sydney, Australia

Domestic team information
- Years: Team
- 1901/02–1903/04: Canterbury

Career statistics
Competition	First-class
Matches	9
Runs scored	320
Batting average	20.00
100s/50s	0/1
Top score	52
Balls bowled	163
Wickets	5
Bowling average	19.80
5 wickets in innings	0
10 wickets in match	0
Best bowling	2/21
Catches/stumpings	2/0
- Source: Cricinfo, 20 October 2020

Raymond Brackley Strange (27 October 1878 – 17 September 1962) was a New Zealand cricketer. He played in nine first-class matches for Canterbury from 1901 to 1904. He later lived in Australia.

== Life and career ==
Born in Christchurch, Strange took a wicket with his first ball in first-class cricket: in his second match, he ended Hawke's Bay's first innings by bowling the last batsman, Tom Dent, with his only delivery. Not until the 1988–89 season did another New Zealander (Stephen Hotter) take a wicket with his first ball in first-class cricket.

Strange was only an occasional bowler. He played as a batsman, and made his highest score of 52 against Wellington in January 1904. He was selected to represent South Island against North Island later that month, when he failed as an opening batsman but took four wickets in South Island's narrow victory. It was his last first-class match.

Strange moved to Sydney in December 1904 and lived in Parramatta, where he married Meta Mance in January 1910. In 1932 he set up a business with Meta as a manufacturer's representative in Hobart, but she died there in June 1934. They had four daughters. He spent some years working as a book-keeper on a sheep station in the Riverina region of New South Wales before returning to Sydney, where he died in September 1962, aged 83.

== See also ==
- List of Canterbury representative cricketers
