= Edmund Strange =

English footballer

Personal information
- Full name: Edmund Wallis Strange
- Date of birth: March 1871
- Place of birth: Bordesley Green, England
- Date of death: 18 December 1925 (aged 54)
- Place of death: Birmingham, England
- Position: Wing half

Senior career*
Years	Team	Apps	(Gls)
1890–1891	Small Heath Ravenhurst		
1891–1892	Hoskins & Sewell		
1892–1893	Small Heath	0	(0)
1894–1895	Langley Mill		
1895–1897	Unity Gas		
1897–1898	Aston Villa	2	(0)
1898	Langley St Michael's		
Total		2	(0)
- * Club domestic league appearances and goals

Edmund Wallis Strange (March 1871 – 18 December 1925) was an English footballer who played in the Football League for Aston Villa. In 1925, he died of complications from an accidental fall in Dudley Road Hospital.
