= Theodore Dalrymple =

English cultural critic and author (born 1949)

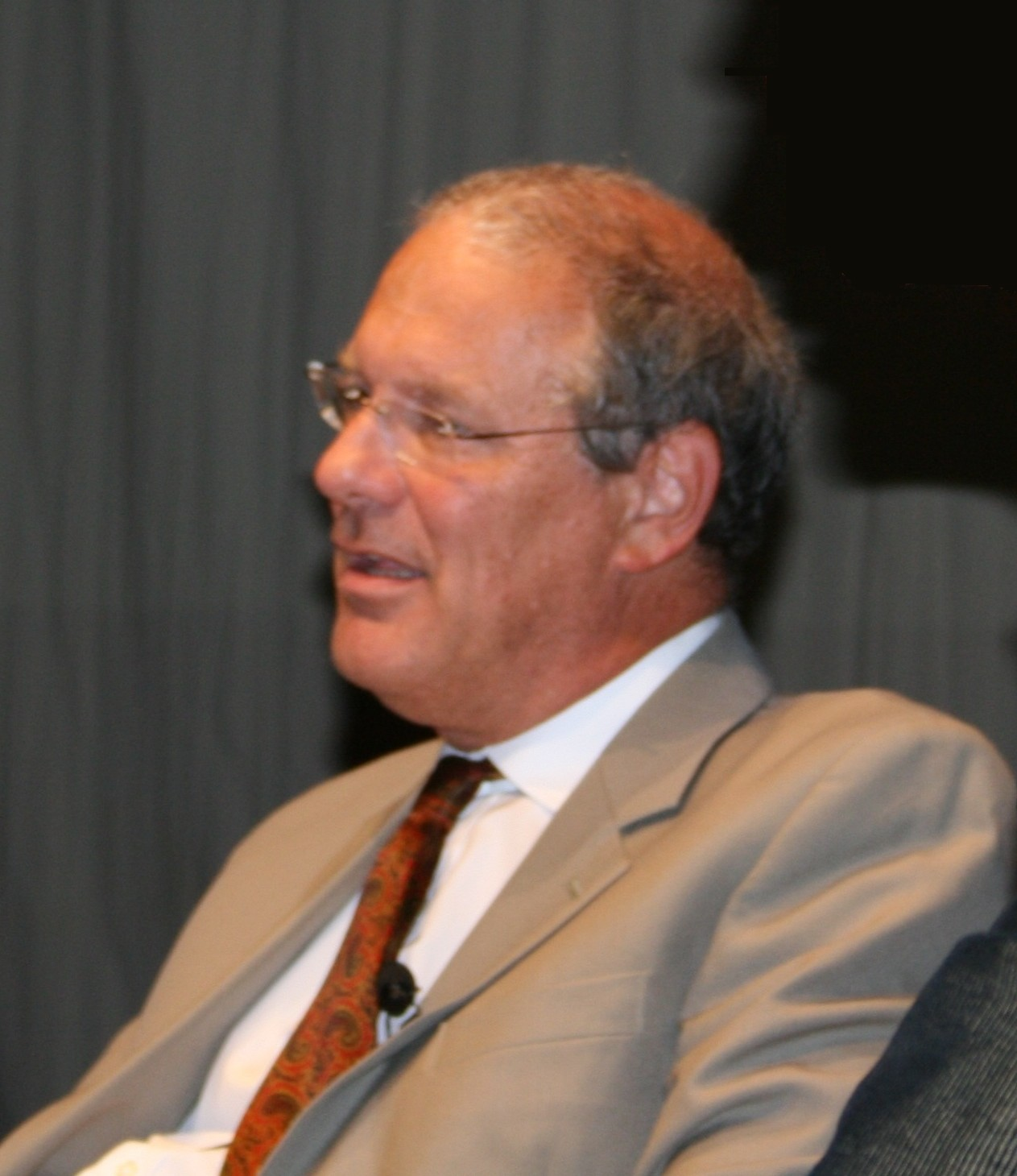
- Dalrymple in 2007
- Born: Anthony Malcolm Daniels; 11 October 1949 (age 76); Kensington, London, England
- Other names: Edward Theberton, Thursday Msigwa
- Occupations: Author, journalist, physician, psychiatrist
- Notable work: Life at the Bottom: The Worldview That Makes the Underclass; Our Culture, What's Left of It; Spoilt Rotten: The Toxic Cult of Sentimentality
- Movement: Conservatism

Anthony Malcolm Daniels (born 11 October 1949), also known by the pen name Theodore Dalrymple (/dælˈrɪmpəl/), is a conservative English cultural critic, prison physician and psychiatrist. He worked in a number of Sub-Saharan African countries as well as in the East End of London. Before his retirement in 2005, he worked in City Hospital, Birmingham and Winson Green Prison in inner-city Birmingham, England.

As Dalrymple, Daniels is a contributing editor to City Journal, published by the Manhattan Institute, where he is the Dietrich Weismann Fellow. In addition to City Journal, his work has appeared in: The British Medical Journal, The Times, New Statesman, The Observer, The Daily Telegraph, The Spectator, The Salisbury Review, National Review, New English Review, The Wall Street Journal and Axess magasin. He is the author of a number of books, including: Life at the Bottom: The Worldview That Makes the Underclass (2001), Our Culture, What's Left of It (2005) and Spoilt Rotten: The Toxic Cult of Sentimentality (2010).

In his Dalrymple pieces, Daniels frequently argues that the views prevalent within Western intellectual circles minimise the responsibility of individuals for their own actions and undermine traditional mores, contributing to the formation within prosperous countries of an underclass afflicted by endemic violence, criminality, sexually transmitted diseases, welfare dependency, and drug abuse. Much of Daniels's writing is based on his experience of working with criminals and the mentally ill.

In 2011, Daniels's Dalrymple work was awarded the Prize for Liberty by the Flemish classical-liberal think-tank Libera!.

== Life ==
Daniels was born in Kensington, London. His father was a Communist businessman of Russian Jewish descent, while his Jewish mother was born in Germany. She came to England as a refugee from the Nazi regime. His grandfather had served as a major in the German Army during World War I.

He studied medicine at the University of Birmingham, graduating with an MB ChB degree in 1974. He became a Member of the Royal College of Psychiatrists in 1980 and qualified as a specialist in psychiatry in 1997.

His work as a physician took him to Southern Rhodesia (now Zimbabwe), Tanzania, South Africa and the Gilbert Islands (now Kiribati). He returned to the United Kingdom in 1990, where he worked in London and Birmingham.

In 1991, he made an extended appearance on British television under the name Theodore Dalrymple. On 23 February, he took part in an After Dark discussion, called "Prisons: No Way Out", alongside the former gangster Tony Lambrianou, the Greek journalist and writer Taki Theodoracopulos, and others.

In 2005, he retired early as a consultant psychiatrist. He has a house in Bridgnorth, Shropshire, and also a house in France.

Regarding his pseudonym "Theodore Dalrymple", he wrote that he "chose a name that sounded suitably dyspeptic, that of a gouty old man looking out of the window of his London club, port in hand, lamenting the degenerating state of the world".

He is an atheist, but has criticised anti-theism and says that "To regret religion is, in fact, to regret our civilization and its monuments, its achievements, and its legacy". Raised in a non-religious Jewish home, he began doubting the existence of a God at age nine. He became an atheist in response to a moment in a school assembly.

Daniels has also used other pen names. As "Edward Theberton", he has written articles for The Spectator from countries in Africa, including Mozambique. He used the name "Thursday Msigwa" when he wrote Filosofa's Republic, a satire of Tanzania under Julius Nyerere. He may also have used another pen name, in addition to his bona fide name.

== Writing ==
Daniels began sending unsolicited articles to The Spectator in the early 1980s; his first published work, entitled "A Bit of a Myth" appeared in the magazine in August 1983 under the name A.M. Daniels. Charles Moore wrote in 2004 that "Theodore Dalrymple, then writing under a different pseudonym, is the only writer I have ever chosen to publish on the basis of unsolicited articles". Between 1984 and 1991 Daniels published articles in The Spectator under the pseudonym Edward Theberton.

Daniels has written extensively on culture, art, politics, education, and medicine – often drawing on his experiences as a doctor and psychiatrist in Africa and the United Kingdom. The historian Noel Malcolm has described Daniels's written accounts of his experiences working at a prison and a public hospital in Birmingham as "journalistic gold", and Moore observed that "it was only when he returned to Britain that he found what he considered to be true barbarism – the cheerless, self-pitying hedonism and brutality of the dependency culture. Now he is its unmatched chronicler." Daniel Hannan wrote in 2011 that Dalrymple "writes about Koestler's essays and Ethiopian religious art and Nietzschean eternal recurrence – subjects which, in Britain, are generally reserved for the reliably Left-of-Centre figures who appear on Start the Week and Newsnight Review. It is Theodore's misfortune to occupy a place beyond the mental co-ordinates of most commissioning editors."

Life at the Bottom: The Worldview That Makes the Underclass, a collection of essays was published in book form in 2001. The essays, which the Manhattan Institute had first begun publishing in City Journal in 1994, deal with themes such as personal responsibility, the mentality of society as a whole, and the troubles of the underclass. As part of his research for the book, Dalrymple interviewed over 10,000 people who had attempted suicide.

Our Culture, What's Left of It: The Mandarins and the Masses, published in 2005, is another collection of essays in which he contends that the middle class's abandonment of traditional cultural and behavioural aspirations has, by example, fostered routine incivility and militant ignorance among the poor. He examines diverse themes and figures in the book including Shakespeare, Marx, Virginia Woolf, food deserts and volitional underclass malnutrition, recreational vulgarity, and the legalisation of drugs. One of the essays in the book, "When Islam Breaks Down", was named one of the most important essays of 2004 by David Brooks in The New York Times.

In 2009, Dalrymple's British publisher Monday Books published two books of his. The first, Not With a Bang But A Whimper, appeared in August 2009. It is different from the United States book of the same name, though some of the author's essays appear in both books. In October 2009, Monday Books published Second Opinion, a further collection of Dalrymple essays, this time dealing exclusively with his work in a British hospital and prison.

With Gibson Square Dalrymple then published Spoilt Rotten: The Toxic Cult of Sentimentality (2010), which analyses how he thinks sentimentality has become culturally entrenched in British society with what he considers harmful effects. In 2011, he published Litter: What Remains of Our Culture, followed by The Pleasure of Thinking (2012), Threats of Pain and Ruin (2014), and others.

Dalrymple was a judge for the 2013 Hippocrates Prize for Poetry and Medicine.

In May 2023 he spoke at the National Conservatism Conference in London on the subject of "Historiography and the State of the Western Mind".

He currently writes a weekly commentary column for the online Taki's Magazine.

== Themes ==
Daniels's writing has some recurring themes.

- The cause of much contemporary misery in Western countries – criminality, domestic violence, drug addiction, aggressive youths, hooliganism, broken families – is the nihilistic, decadent and/or self-destructive behaviour of people who do not know how to live. Both the smoothing over of this behaviour, and the medicalisation of the problems that emerge as a corollary of this behaviour, are forms of indifference. Someone has to tell those people, patiently and with understanding for the particulars of the case, that they have to live differently.
- Poverty does not explain aggressive, criminal and self-destructive behaviour. In an African slum you will find among the very poor, living in dreadful circumstances, dignity and decency in abundance, which are painfully lacking in an average English suburb, although its inhabitants are much wealthier.
- An attitude characterised by gratefulness and having obligations towards others has been replaced – with awful consequences – by an awareness of "rights" and a sense of entitlement, without responsibilities. This leads to resentment as the rights become violated by parents, authorities, bureaucracies and others in general.
- One of the things that make Islam attractive to young westernised Muslim men is the opportunity it gives them to dominate women.
- Technocratic or bureaucratic solutions to the problems of mankind produce disasters in cases where the nature of man is the root cause of those problems.
- It is a myth, when going "cold turkey" from an opiate such as heroin, that the withdrawal symptoms are virtually unbearable; they are in fact hardly worse than flu.
- Criminality is much more often the cause of drug addiction than its consequence.
- Sentimentality, which is becoming entrenched in British society, is "the progenitor, the godparent, the midwife of brutality".
- High culture and refined aesthetic tastes are worth defending, and despite the protestations of non-judgmentalists who say all expression is equal, they are superior to popular culture.
- The ideology of the Welfare State is used to diminish personal responsibility. Erosion of personal responsibility makes people dependent on institutions and favours the existence of a threatening and vulnerable underclass.
- Moral relativism can easily be a trick of an egotistical mind to silence the voice of conscience.
- Multiculturalism and cultural relativism are at odds with common sense.
- The decline of civilised behaviour – self-restraint, modesty, zeal, humility, irony, detachment – ruins social and personal life.
- The root cause of our contemporary cultural poverty is intellectual dishonesty. First, the intellectuals have destroyed the foundation of culture, and second, they refuse to acknowledge it by resorting to the caves of political correctness.

== Bibliography ==
- Coups and Cocaine: Two Journeys in South America (1986)
- Fool or Physician: The Memoirs of a Sceptical Doctor (1987)
- Zanzibar to Timbuktu (1988)
- Filosofa's Republic (1989) (published under the pen name Thursday Msigwa)
- Sweet Waist of America: Journeys around Guatemala (1990)
- The Wilder Shores of Marx: Journeys in a Vanishing World (1991) ISBN 009174153X (published in the U.S. as Utopias Elsewhere) ISBN 978-0517585481
- Monrovia Mon Amour: A Visit to Liberia (1992)
- If Symptoms Persist: Anecdotes from a Doctor (1994)
- So Little Done: The Testament of a Serial Killer (1996)
- If Symptoms Still Persist (1996)
- Mass Listeria: The Meaning of Health Scares (1998)
- An Intelligent Person's Guide to Medicine (2001)
- Life at the Bottom: The Worldview That Makes the Underclass (2001) ISBN 1-56663-382-6
- Violence, Disorder and Incivility in British Hospitals: The Case For Zero Tolerance (book published by the Social Affairs Unit, 2002) ISBN 0-907631-97-5
- Our Culture, What's Left of It: The Mandarins and the Masses (2005) ISBN 1-56663-643-4
- Romancing Opiates: Pharmacological Lies and the Addiction Bureaucracy (2006) ISBN 1-59403-087-1 (published in the U.K. as Junk Medicine: Doctors, Lies and the Addiction Bureaucracy ISBN 1-905641-59-1)
- Making Bad Decisions. About the Way we Think of Social Problems (2006) (Dr. J. Tans Lecture 2006; published by Studium Generale Maastricht, The Netherlands. Lecture read on Wednesday 15 November 2006. ISBN 978-90-78769-01-9)
- In Praise of Prejudice: The Necessity of Preconceived Ideas (2007) ISBN 1-59403-202-5
- Not With a Bang But a Whimper: The Politics and Culture of Decline (US edition) (2008) ISBN 1-56663-795-3
- Second Opinion. A Doctor's Notes from the Inner City (2009) ISBN 978-1-906308-12-4
- Not With a Bang But a Whimper: The Politics and Culture of Decline (UK edition; contains three essays that are not in the US edition) (2009) ISBN 978-1-906308-10-0
- The Examined Life (2010a) ISBN 978-1906308162
- The New Vichy Syndrome. Why European Intellectuals Surrender to Barbarism (2010b) ISBN 978-1-59403-372-8
- Spoilt Rotten: The Toxic Cult of Sentimentality (2010). Gibson Square. ISBN 978-1906142612
- Vrijheid en oprechtheid (Freedom and integrity), Pelckmans (2011), together with Bart De Wever
- Mr Clarke's Modest Proposal: Supportive Evidence from Yeovil (2011). Social Affairs Unit. ISBN 978-1904863601
- Anything Goes (2011). New English Review Press. ISBN 978-0578084893
- Litter: How Other People's Rubbish Shapes Our Life (2011). Gibson Square Books. ISBN 978-1906142865
- Farewell Fear (2012). New English Review Press. ISBN 978-0985439477
- The Pleasure of Thinking: A Journey through the Sideways Leaps of Ideas (2012). Gibson Square Books. ISBN 978-1908096081
- Threats of Pain and Ruin (2014). New English Review Press. ISBN 978-0991652112
- Admirable Evasions: How Psychology Undermines Morality (2015). Encounter Books. ISBN 978-1594037870
- Out into the Beautiful World (2015). New English Review Press. ISBN 978-1943003020
- Migration, Multiculturalism and its Metaphors: Selected Essays (2016). Connor Court. ISBN 978-1-925501-10-0
- The Proper Procedure and Other Stories (2017). New English Review Press. ISBN 978-1943003105
- The Knife Went In: Real-Life Murderers and Our Culture (2018). Gibson Square. ISBN 978-1783341184
- The Terror of Existence: From Ecclesiastes to Theatre of the Absurd (2018). New English Review Press. ISBN 978-1943003228
- False Positive: A Year of Error, Omission, and Political Correctness in the New England Journal of Medicine (2019). ISBN 978-1641770460
- In Praise of Folly: The Blind-spots of Our Mind (2019). Gibson Square. ISBN 978-1783341412
- Embargo and Other Stories (2020). Mirabeau Press. ISBN 978-0578674537
- Around the World in the Cinemas of Paris (2020). Mirabeau Press. ISBN 978-1735705507
- Saving the Planet and Other Stories (2021). Mirabeau Press. ISBN 978-1735705521
- Midnight Maxims (2021). Mirabeau Press. ISBN 978-1735705538
- Ramses: A Memoir (2022). New English Review Press. ISBN 978-1943003709
- Neither Trumpets Nor Violins (2022). New English Review Press. ISBN 978-1943003563 (co-written with Samuel Hux and Kenneth Francis)
- The Wheelchair and Other Stories (2022). Mirabeau Press. ISBN 978-1735705545
- These Spindrift Pages (2023). Mirabeau Press. ISBN 978-1735705552
- Buried But Not Quite Dead: Forgotten Writers of Père Lachaise (2024). Criterion Books. ISBN 978-1641773676
- Filosofa's Republic (2024). Mirabeau Press. ISBN 978-1735705576
- On the Ivory Stages (2024). Mirabeau Press. ISBN 978-1735705583
- Nothing but Wickedness: the Origins of the Decline of our Culture (2025). Gibson Square Books. ISBN 978-1908096968
- Not for Ambition or Bread (2025). Mirabeau Press. ISBN 978-1735705590
- An Englishman's Home Is His Car Park: Slovenliness as a Way of Life (2026). Gibson Square Books. ISBN 978-1783342938
- Agatha Christie and the Metaphysics of Murder (2026). Encounter Books. ISBN 978-1641775137
- Not For the Proud Man Apart (2026). Mirabeau Press. ISBN 979-8993967424
