= Life at the Bottom =

2001 book by Theodore Dalrymple

- Cover for Life at the Bottom
- Author: Theodore Dalrymple
- Genre: Non-fiction, sociology, political
- Publisher: Ivan R. Dee
- Publication date: 2001
- Media type: Print (hardback & paperback)
- Pages: 263
- ISBN: 1-56663-505-5

Life at the Bottom: The Worldview That Makes the Underclass is a collection of essays written by British writer, physician and psychiatrist Theodore Dalrymple. They are about personal responsibility, the mentality of society as a whole and the troubles of the underclass. The Manhattan Institute, a conservative think tank based in New York City, started publishing the contents of these essays in City Journal magazine in 1994. Dalrymple had problems finding a British publisher to help him turn his individual essays into a collection, so he eventually sought an American company for publication. They were published in book form by Ivan R. Dee in 2001.

The main themes expressed in the collection include how an individual's worldview affects their actions and the attitudes of those around them, the philosophy of social determinism and why a lack of personal responsibility for one's actions results from an individual's beliefs in determinism. The writing style that Dalrymple explains these in was praised by reviewers for its clear, witty prose and for going immediately to the heart of the matter that is being discussed.

Many reviews of the collection were positive, applauding how Dalrymple had used his experiences to create a work that gives a transparent look at poverty in England. The main detraction that reviewers had for the collection was that Dalrymple often became too opinionated in his writing while he was trying to get across the results of his experiences.

== Background ==
Between 1990 and 2000, "Theodore Dalrymple," whose real name is Anthony Daniels, worked as a physician at City Hospital and Birmingham Prison, both located in the Winson Green area of Birmingham, England. During this time, he wrote essays on topics related to his work, such as his discussions with patients and inmates. Individual essays began being published periodically in the American quarterly magazine City Journal in 1994. The collection does not contain all of the essays he wrote about his experiences, but only the ones he considered the best, whether for their humour or their truth.

The experiences and situations described are largely anecdotal, but Dalrymple explains that he interviewed over 10,000 people who attempted suicide and had them tell stories about "the lives of four or five other people," resulting in a sample base of around 50,000 individuals. Since he is writing about the English underclass, Dalrymple acknowledges the majority of the people interviewed, remembered and discussed about are white. According to economist Thomas Sowell, this allows a look at the underclass "without fear of being called 'racist'."

In his attempts to have his collection published in a single work, Dalrymple turned to "an American house of conservative leaning" because he had little luck with British publishers. The publisher who eventually helped Dalrymple release the book was the Ivan R. Dee imprint of Rowman & Littlefield publishing house. They published the collection as a hardcover in 2001.

== Content ==
The collection of essays has an introduction, an index, and two sections called "Grim Reality" and "Grimmer Theory." The sections are individually broken up into chapters, with sixteen in "Grim Reality" and six in "Grimmer Theory." Each chapter is an individual essay, which were published in separate issues of City Journal around seven years prior. The chapters are organised thematically, not necessarily in chronological order. The essays focus largely on the underclass and the premise that in the latter half of the 20th century, poverty and hunger are no longer descriptive of the poor. Instead, lack of money has been replaced with "emptiness, agonies, violence and moral squalor."

The main argument represented in the collection is that, rather than economics and wealth, modern-style poverty is described by a "wildly dysfunctional set of values." A number of chapters discuss the "ferocious young egoist" that is meant to represent male youths who are violent and obsessive toward their significant others. Dalrymple also writes about his views on the "destruction of...family ties," arguing that without family ties it is nearly impossible to rise out of the underclass. These issues, among others, are described as resulting from the "intellectual foundation...[which] makes a permanent underclass possible." This is meant to be directed against intellectuals and liberals that form the many ideas absorbed into the mentality of the underclass.

In the larger first section titled "Grim Reality," Dalrymple "uses specific stories from his practice and from some journalistic forays to show how the 'fundamental premise of popular culture' leads to actions that wreck people's lives." This section covers things like modern Bohemianism, drug addictions and overdoses, lack of education, familial obligations, physical abuse and the concept of personal responsibility for choices made. Then, in the section "Grimmer Theory," he "shows that the twentieth century's intellectuals have provided members of the underclass with a battery of rationalizations by which they can shift the blame for their misery away from their actions and attitudes and can unleash their hatred of everyone who challenges their outlook." Focusing on ideas more than events, this section considers the concepts of relativism, determinism and egalitarianism, and how each idea, in their creation by the bourgeoisie intellectuals, adversely affects the underclass.

== Themes ==
The work explores the various worldviews of individuals and societies and the impositions of society on those within it. Dalrymple states that "...everyone has a Weltanschauung, a worldview, whether he knows it or not...Their ideas make themselves manifest even in the language they use." The example stated is using passive speech by "those who refuse to accept responsibility for their acts." The type of language that the underclass uses, according to Dalrymple, professes their own ideas and ideology about the world.

The book also explains the philosophy of social determinism held by those Dalrymple interviewed, and how the welfare state and the socialist tenets within it help feed this mindset. However, Dalrymple never directly accuses socialism and the welfare state in his essays, instead focusing on the beliefs and reasons for why the patients and inmates take the destructive actions that they did. This is expressed with determinism in that they believe that their actions must be based on their childhoods or the failure of society in the past to help them. Those patients that Dalrymple speaks with "seem surprised and tell him that he's the first person they've ever talked to who suggests that they can change their lives for the better," further emphasising the mindset in which their society has placed them.

An important subset to this deterministic theme, related to the original worldview idea as well, is the lack of personal responsibility that those in the underclass accept for their own actions. An example of this, which is repeated numerous times throughout the collection, is the statement, "The knife went in," in reference to the words of one of Dalrymple's patients who was in jail for murder. This sort of speech makes a person's actions seem like they are something separate from the person themselves and that they have no control over it.

A sub-theme that is mentioned is the conflict between two groups, the Indian Sikhs and the Pakistani Muslims, who "not only cannot get along with each other but also cannot adapt to secular Britain." This conflict is shown throughout the collection, usually when an Indian or Pakistani woman is acting as a patient for Dalrymple, who then extracts the story for why the person is there. However, there are only a few stories told from the perspective of Indian Sikhs and Pakistani Muslims since the majority of the patients and prisoners that Dalrymple interviews are white.

== Style ==
Meic Pearse of Third Way magazine described the style of the collection as "funny yet depressing, easy to read yet extremely profound." Publishers Weekly considered the writing to be "graceful and often witty," although the "main points get hammered home too quickly and too often." Doctor D. of the National Review considered the style to be "extraordinary," with "clear and penetrating prose" that was "always fearless for the truth." James R. Otteson, in his book Actual Ethics, spoke of how Dalrymple "does not employ the facts and figures," but "relies instead on his anecdotal experience." This, however, allows the "patterns [to] crystallize with pellucid clarity [very clear, transparently clear]."

== Critical reception ==
Life at the Bottom has received mostly positive reviews. Gregory Schneider of the Topeka Capital-Journal called the collection "the best exploration of the problems of poverty ever written." America magazine writer, Peter Heinegg, considered the essays to be a "barrage of breathtakingly horrible true-life...stories," but he said that Dalrymple puts too much of his personal "snorting indignation" into the text without letting the reader draw their own conclusions. He ended by saying, "Dalrymple's case sounds like a paranoid tirade or perverse tribute, but it is at least partially redeemed by the barrage of breathtakingly horrible true-life (one assumes) stories that this very angry doctor tells...to bolster it." John Clark of Liberty magazine called it "so compelling...that I read it cover to cover in a day's time—and later reread it twice."

Conservative economist and author Thomas Sowell, a Senior Fellow at the Hoover Institute at Stanford University, described the book as "brilliant and insightful" in Capitalism magazine, and as "an insightful and devastating eyewitness account of the white underclass in Britain" in Jewish World Review. Overall, Sowell said that the collection was able to explain that "One of the most telling examples of the social destructiveness of the left's welfare state vision can be found among the white slum dwellers in Britain."

Atlanta Journal-Constitution writer, Theresa K. Weaver, called the collection "saddening, infuriating and ultimately not terribly empowering," stating that she wishes Dalrymple "might at least offer a few ideas on turning everything around." Arthur Foulkes of the Carolina Journal described it as a "fine book" that "offers much to friends of liberty everywhere." Roger Donway of The Atlas Society considered it to be "one of the most instructive books that I have read in many years." Stephen Goode, writing for Insight on the News, said that the collection argued its "position brilliantly and with impressive passion." The National Observer wrote that it "has much value," if it is taken as an "antidote to fashionable loose thinking."

== See also ==
- Down and Out in Paris and London
- High culture
- Moral relativism
- Our Culture, What's Left of It
- Political correctness
- Spoilt Rotten
