= Soho, West Midlands =

Coordinates: 52.4991°N 1.9288°W

Soho
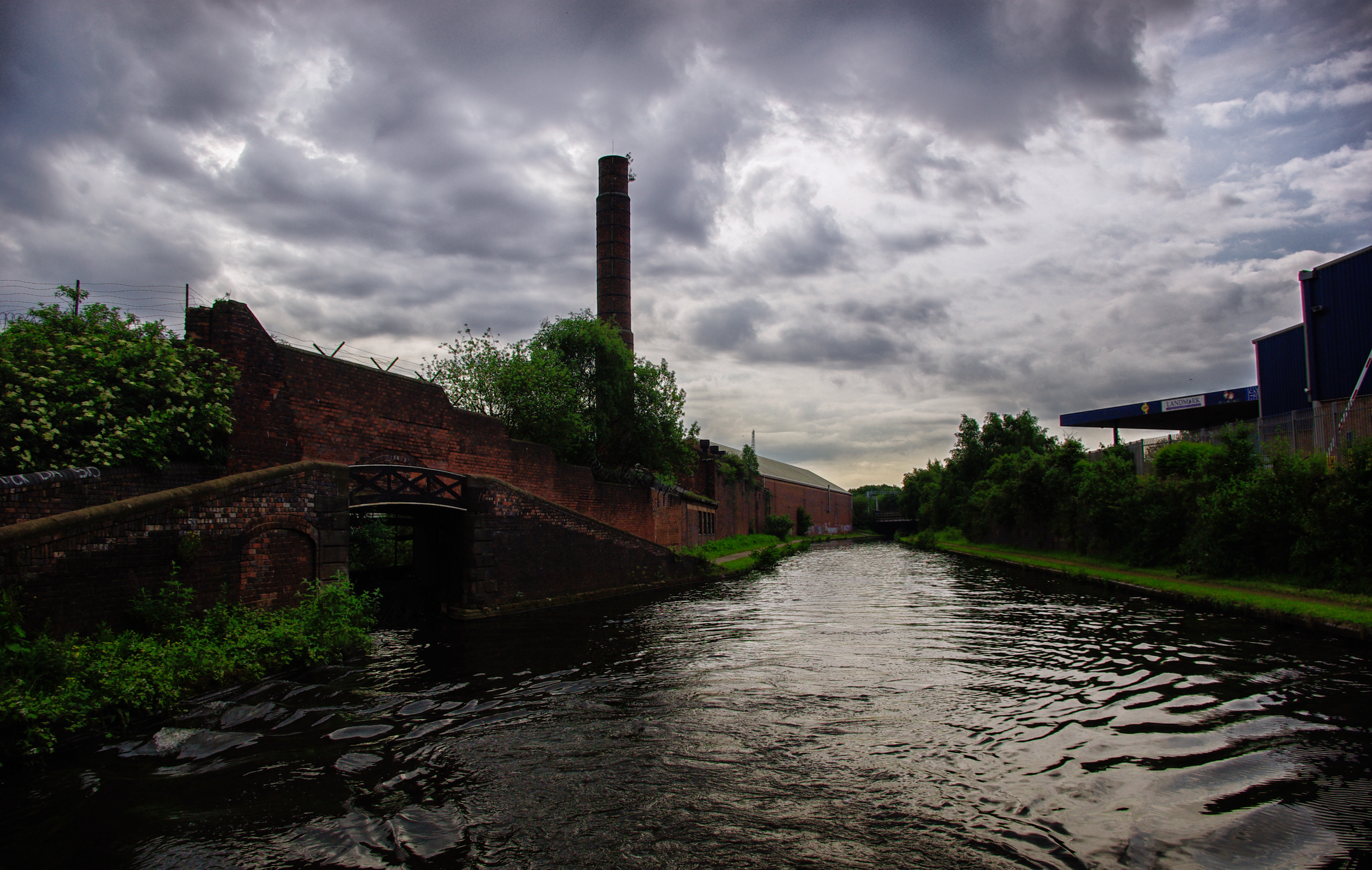
- Soho Foundry at Smethwick

- Location within the West Midlands
- Population: 30,317 (2011.Ward)
  - Density: 62.7 per ha
- OS grid reference: SP048890
- Metropolitan borough: Birmingham and Sandwell
- Metropolitan county: West Midlands
- Region: West Midlands
- Country: England
- Sovereign state: United Kingdom
- Post town: BIRMINGHAM
- Postcode district: B21
- Dialling code: 0121
- Police: West Midlands
- Fire: West Midlands
- Ambulance: West Midlands
- UK Parliament: Birmingham Ladywood

Soho is an area split between the Birmingham and Sandwell metropolitan boroughs of the West Midlands in England. The area is located on the A41 road. The name was originally applied to a single cottage or tenement which can be found on William Yates's 1777 map of Staffordshire, and its ultimate origin is obscure, with no obvious connection to the better-known district of London; equally, the belief that the name is an abbreviation of South House, denoting that it was located to the south of Handsworth is fanciful and without evidence. The section of the A41 separating Handsworth from Winson Green is known as Soho Road.

Soho expanded dramatically during the 19th century with the construction of numerous houses and factories, and immigration from the Commonwealth was centred on these homes during the 1950s and 1960s. Most of the immigrants who settled in Soho were of Indian origin.

Further housebuilding took place by the local council during the 1960s and 1970s. Soho falls partly in the Soho ward of the City of Birmingham and partly in the Soho and Victoria ward of the Borough of Sandwell.

== Soho ward, Birmingham ==
Until 1911 the part now within Birmingham formed part of Handsworth District, and is now a ward within the council constituency of Ladywood.

=== Demography ===
The 2001 Population Census found that 25,634 people were living in Soho with a population density of 5,369 people per km^{2} compared with 3,649 people per km^{2} for Birmingham. Soho covers an area of 4.8 km^{2}. The ward is a very ethnically diverse area with ethnic minorities making up 76.2% (19,522) of the ward's population, compared with 29.6% in Birmingham.

==== Ethnicity Population ====
- White British – 20.48%
- White Irish – 2.20%
- White Other – 1.17%
- Mixed: White and Black Caribbean – 2.80%
- Mixed: White and Black African – 0.22%
- Mixed: White and Asian – 0.81%
- Mixed: Other – 0.95%
- Indian – 26.77%
- Pakistani – 13.99%
- Bangladeshi – 3.88%
- Other Asian – 2.31%
- Afro-Caribbean – 18.13%
- African – 1.44%
- Other Black – 2.42%
- Chinese – 0.69%

=== Politics ===
Soho forms part of the Soho and Jewellery Quarter ward on Birmingham City Council, and is represented by two Labour councillors: Shuranjeet Singh and Su Brooks.

Soho Ward has adopted a Ward Support Officer with the current holder of the title being Tariq M. Khan.

In 2014, James Turner Street, in the Winson Green area of the ward featured in the TV series Benefits Street.

== Places of interest ==
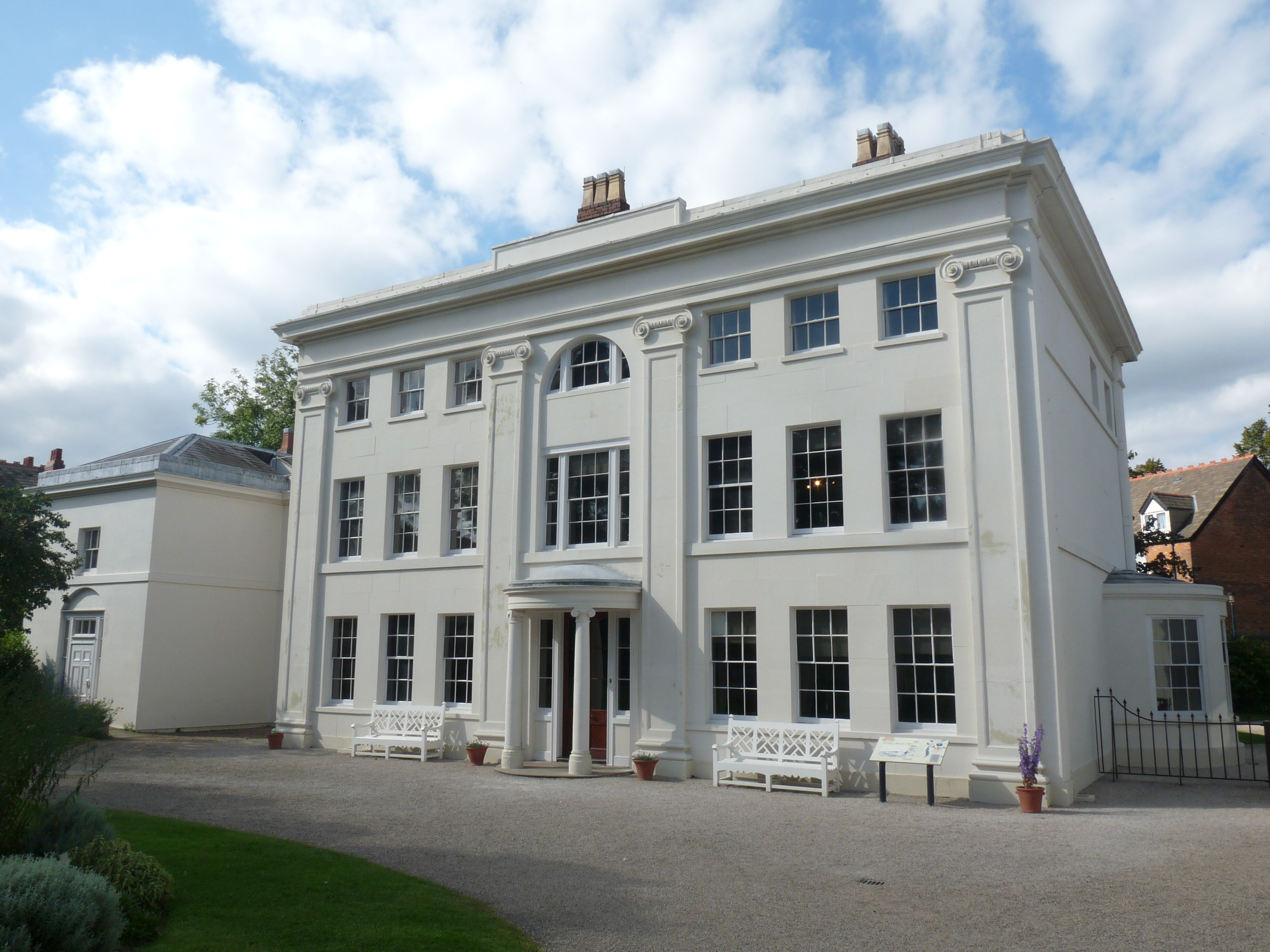
Soho House

Industrialist Matthew Boulton opened his "Soho Manufactory" (an early factory) there in 1761. Boulton himself resided at Soho House, now a community museum of the Birmingham Museums & Art Gallery run by Birmingham City Council.

The parish church is dedicated to St John Chrysostom. The area is served by Handsworth Library.

Winson Green Prison and City Hospital are located within the Winson Green area of the ward.

Soho is home to a Train Care Depot and the Soho Foundry, which was Matthew Boulton and James Watt’s famous factory. Most of the rest of the area is industrial with some housing.

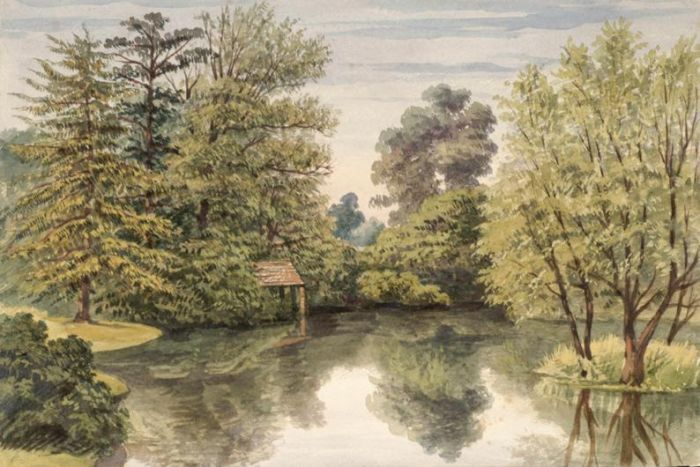
Soho Pool, by Allen Edward Everitt.

== Transport ==
Soho had stations on the London & North Western Railway built Stour Valley Line between Smethwick Rolfe Street and the closed Winson Green railway station, and on the Great Western Railway between Handsworth & Smethwick and Hockley (replaced by Jewellery Quarter). It is currently served by the West Midlands Metro on the former GWR line with a stop at Soho Benson Road.
