= Bottom dweller =

Bottom dweller or Bottom Dweller may refer to:

- organism living in a Benthic zone
- Bottom Dweller, a pornographic film directed by Patrick Collins

== See also ==
- Dweller of the Depths, transformation of Aquaman
- Life at the Bottom, collection of essays by Theodore Dalrymple
- Deep biosphere
- Timeline of human evolution
