= Our Culture, What's Left of It =

2005 Book by Theodore Dalrymple

Our Culture, What's Left of It: The Mandarins and the Masses
- Author: Theodore Dalrymple
- Language: English
- Subject: Social criticism
- Published: 25 May 2005 Ivan R. Dee
- Publication place: United States
- ISBN: 1-56663-643-4

Our Culture, What's Left of It: The Mandarins and the Masses is a 2005 non-fiction book by British physician and writer Theodore Dalrymple. It is composed of twenty-six separate pieces that cover a wide range of topics from drug legalisation to the influence of Shakespeare. A common theme is criticism of modern society in Great Britain and, in many articles, social attitudes towards literature. The book was published by the Ivan R. Dee group. He generally describes British culture as a "moral swamp" and writes that the people must return to past traditions before it is too late.

== Contents ==
As a common theme, Dalrymple depicts what he sees as "the moral swamp that is contemporary Britain". He criticises current British national culture as "a banal, self-pitying, witless and shallow emotional incontinence". He advocates a restoration of what he calls traditional British virtues such as "prudence, thrift, industry, honesty, moderation, politeness, self-restraint".

He condemns the secularisation of British society, writing:

The loss of the religious understanding of the human condition— that man is a fallen creature for whom virtue is necessary but never fully attainable— is a loss, not a gain, in true sophistication. The secular substitute— the belief in the perfection of life on earth by the endless extension of a choice of pleasures— is not merely callow by comparison but much less realistic in its understanding of human nature.

He describes his experience treating people who use illegal drugs. He defends the 'war on drugs' and attacks the arguments for legalisation. He writes, "If the war on drugs is lost, then so are the wars against theft, speeding, incest, fraud, rape, murder, arson... Few, if any such wars are winnable."

== Reception ==
The Times Literary Supplement published a mostly positive review by author and editor Richard Davenport-Hines. Davenport-Hines argued that Dalrymple left out the pernicious influence of American culture on Britain—such as the instant gratification provided on trashy American television and the popularity of unhealthy American fast food. Richard Davenport-Hines also wrote more generally that:

Dalrymple has, it must be stressed, written an urgent, important, almost an essential book. Our Culture, What's Left of It needs to be read and acted on by policy-makers, by opinion-formers, and anyone who wants to grasp why Britain has become so much less pleasant a country in which to live. The book is elegantly written, conscientiously argued, provocative and fiercely committed... His measured polemics arouse disgust, shame and despair: they will shake many readers' views of their physical surroundings and cultural assumptions, and have an enriching power to improve the way that people think and act.

A supportive review appeared in News Weekly, who stated that "It is rare for a book on social issues to be so readable, but this is not a work of abstract social theory." The review also stated that "The vividness of Dalrymple's prose and the remorseless logic of his arguments make this a formidable work. Anyone concerned about the fate of Western civilisation should read this book."

== See also ==
- 2005 in literature
- Spoilt Rotten: The Toxic Cult of Sentimentality
- Life at the Bottom: The Worldview That Makes the Underclass
