= Soho and Winson Green railway station =

Former railway station in England

Soho & Winson Green
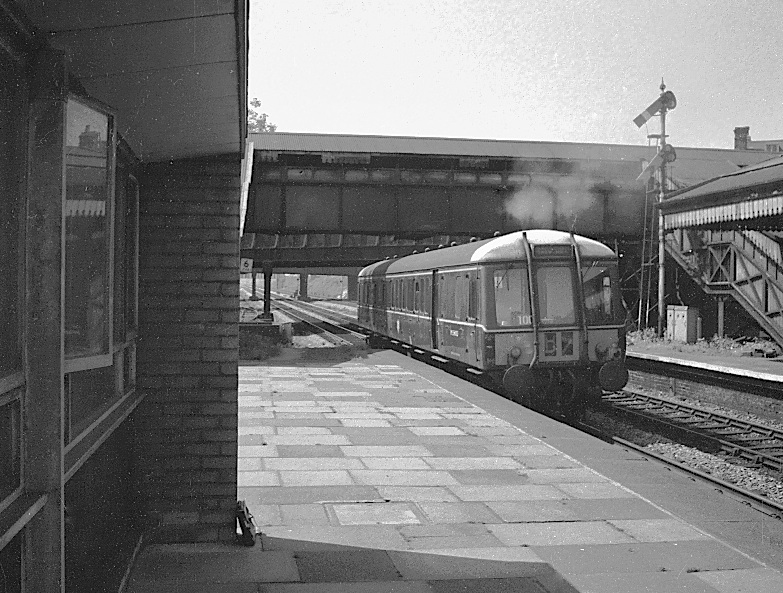
- The station in March 1967

General information
- Location: Soho, Birmingham, Sandwell & Birmingham; England
- Coordinates: 52.4970°N 1.9306°W
- Grid reference: SP048887
- Platforms: 4

Other information
- Status: Disused

History
- Original company: Great Western Railway
- Pre-grouping: Great Western Railway

Key dates
- 14 November 1854: Opened as Soho
- 1893: Renamed as Soho and Winson Green
- 14 June 1965: Renamed as Winson Green
- 6 March 1972: Closed
- 1999: Soho Benson Road tram stop built on site of station.
Location

Soho & Winson Green was an intermediate station on the Great Western Railway's London Paddington to Birkenhead via Birmingham Snow Hill line, serving the Soho and Winson Green areas. Opened in 1854 as "Soho" station, its name was changed to "Soho and Winson Green" in May 1893, and finally to "Winson Green" on 14 June 1965, following the closure of a nearby station of that name. It was elaborately decorated and had 4 platforms. In 1972, the station closed, along with the entire line.

Soho Benson Road tram stop now sits upon the former station site, as part of the Midland Metro light-rail system.

== Image gallery ==
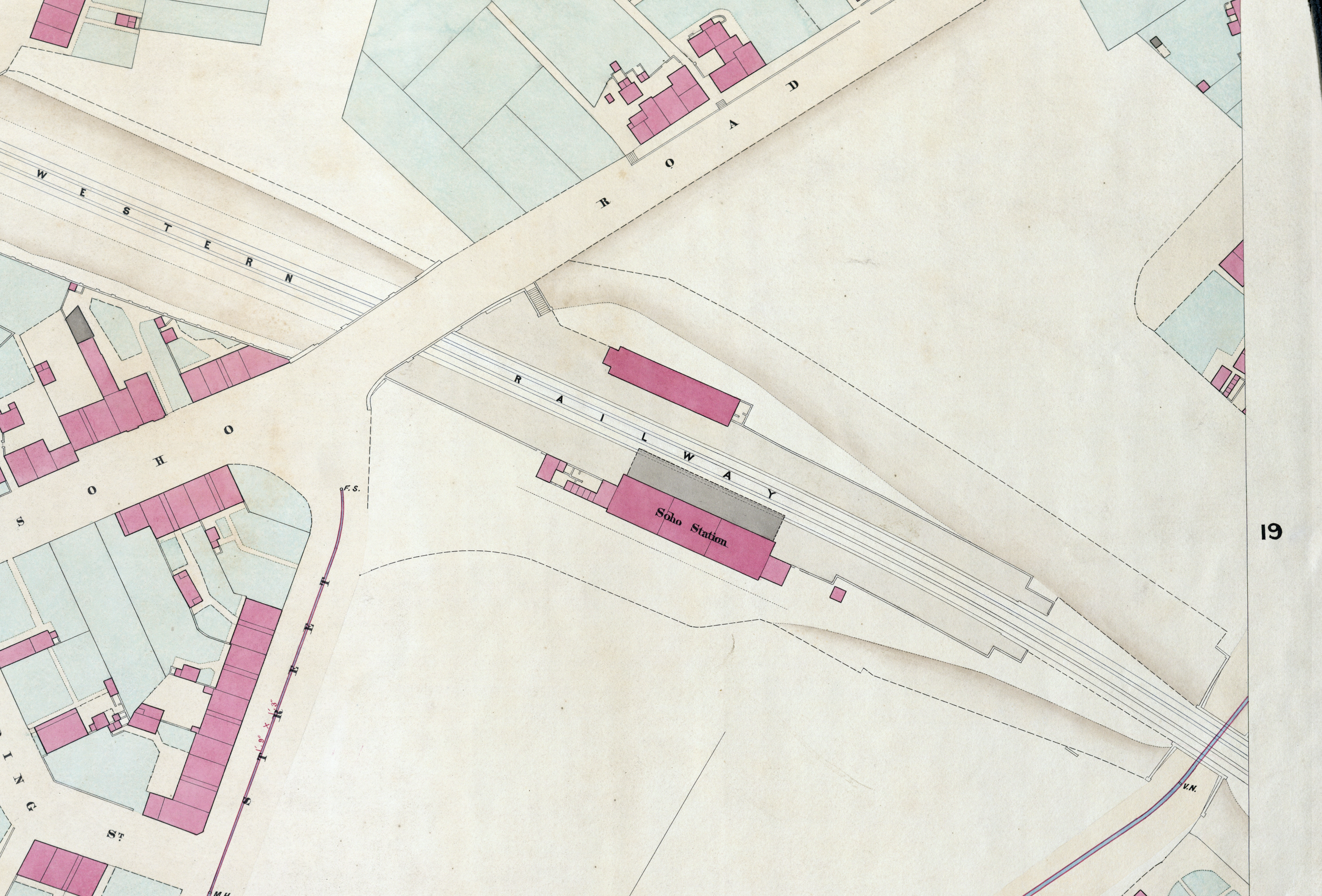
Soho Station on the 1855 New Survey of the Borough of Birmingham. The road labelled "Soho Road" is now Benson Road

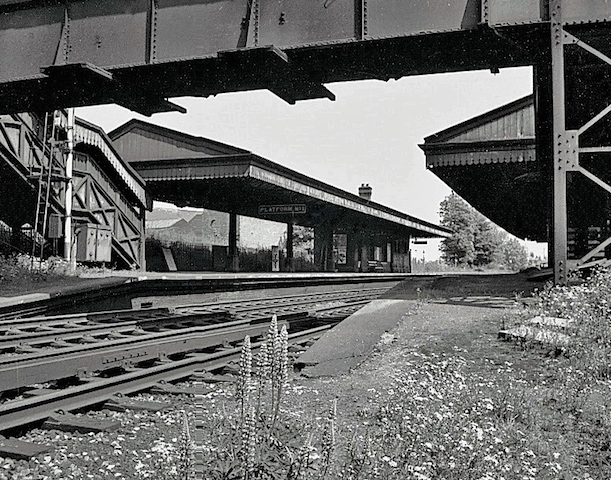
The station in 1967

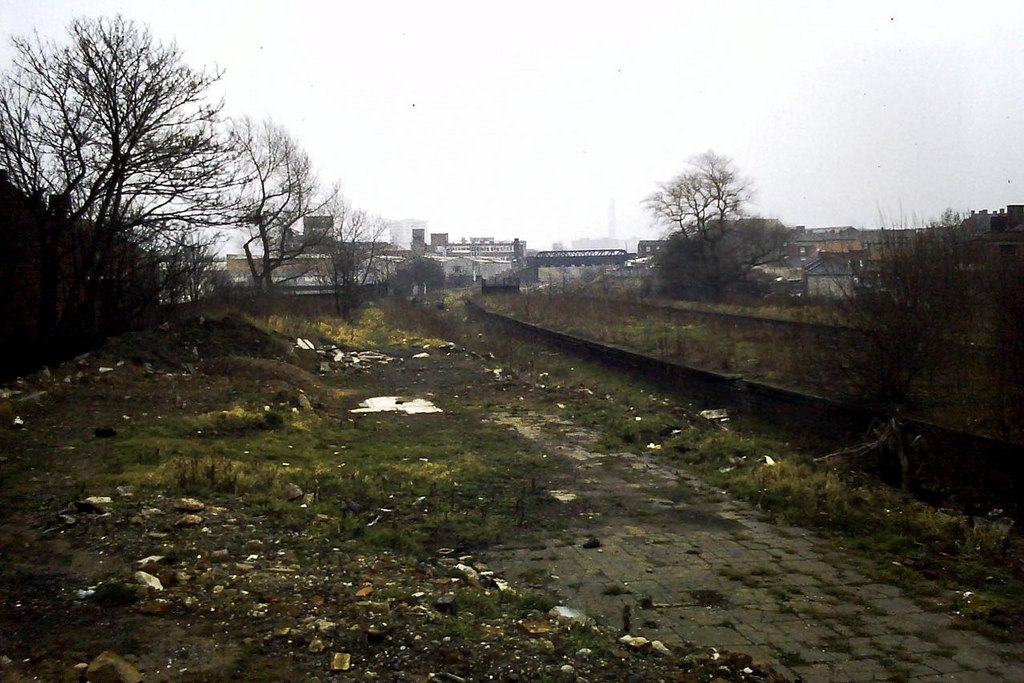
The remains of the station in 1986

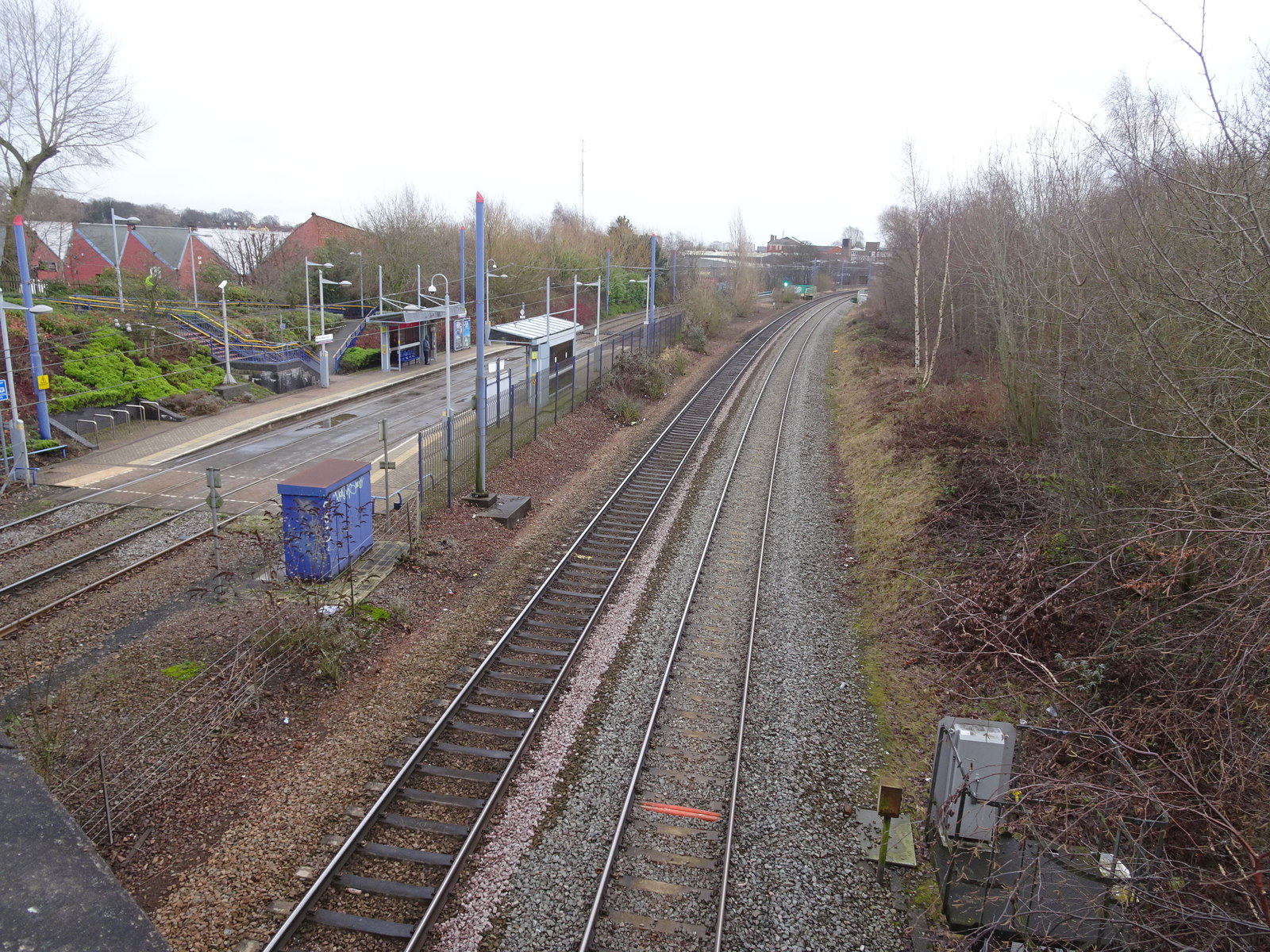
Site of the station in 2018 adjacent to Soho Benson Road tram stop

Preceding station	Historical railways	Following station
Handsworth and Smethwick	Great Western Railway; Birmingham–Wolverhampton (1854-1972)	Hockley
