= Bertha Ryland =

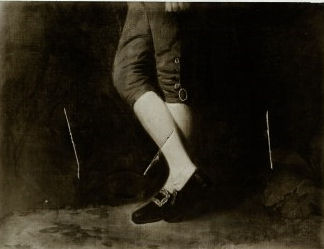
The damage caused to Romney's Master Thornhill by Bertha Ryland in 1914

Bertha Wilmot Ryland (12 October 1882 – April 1977) was a militant suffragette and member of the Women's Social and Political Union (WSPU) who after slashing a painting in Birmingham Art Gallery in 1914 went on hunger strike in Winson Green Prison in Birmingham for which she was awarded the WSPU's Hunger Strike Medal.

== Early life ==
Born in Edgbaston in Birmingham, Bertha Ryland was the youngest of five children of Alice Felicia née Wilmot (1846–1927) and William Henry Ryland (1844–1925), an architect. Her pedigree as a campaigner for women's suffrage was long: her mother Mrs Alice Ryland of 19 Hermitage Road in Edgbaston had been a member of the executive committee of the Birmingham Women's Suffrage Society (BWSS) in the mid-1870s. Unhappy with the progress being made by the BWSS, in 1907 Mrs Ryland and Bertha joined the Birmingham branch of the Women's Social and Political Union where Bertha Ryland worked closely with Gladice Keevil and Hilda Burkitt. In 1910 Ryland established a new WSPU branch in Lichfield.

== Militancy ==
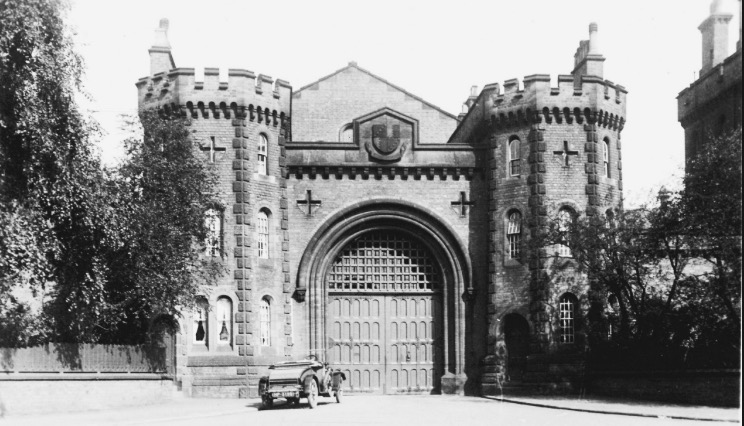
In 1912 Ryland was sentenced to six months in Winson Green Prison - seen here in the 1920s

In November 1911 Bertha Ryland was sentenced at Bow Street Magistrates' Court to a week's imprisonment in Holloway Prison. After taking part in the window-smashing campaign on Bond Street in London in March 1912 she was sentenced at the London Sessions to six months’ imprisonment, serving four months in Winson Green Prison where she was strip-searched and went on hunger strike and was force-fed 14 times, for which she received the Hunger Strike Medal from the WSPU. Her treatment caused permanent damage to her kidney.

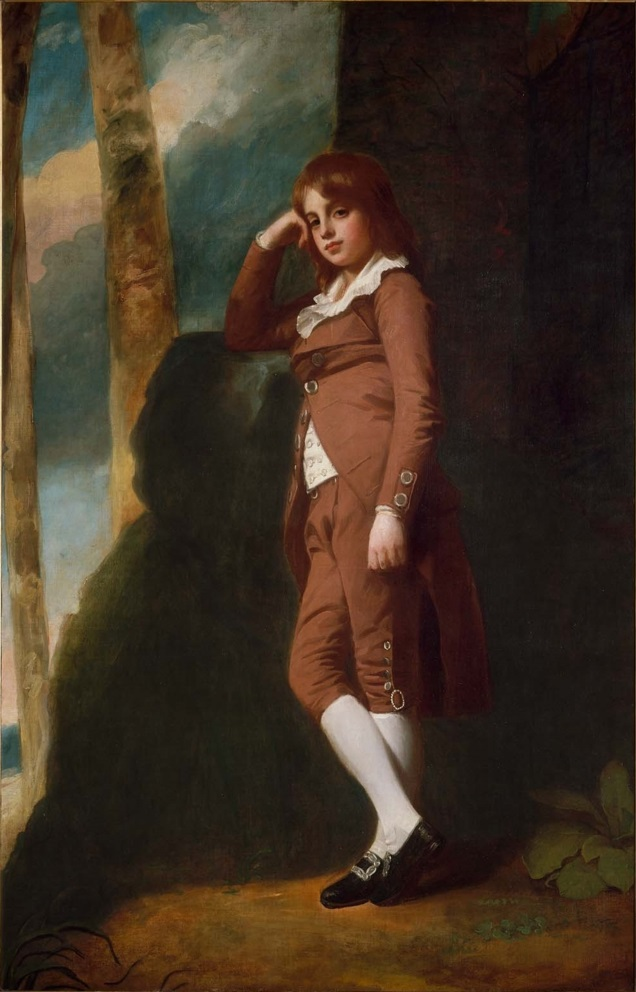
In 1914 Ryland damaged the painting of John Bensley Thornhill known as 'Master Thornhill' by George Romney in Birmingham Art Gallery

On 8 June 1914 the 31 year-old Ryland slashed the painting of John Bensley Thornhill known as 'Master Thornhill' by George Romney in Birmingham Art Gallery three times with a meat cleaver she had concealed in her jacket causing £50 worth of damage. During the attack she had on her a letter containing her name and address which justified her action, stating: 'I attack this work of art deliberately as a protest against the government's criminal injustice in denying women the vote, and also against the government's brutal injustice in imprisonings, forcibly feeding, and drugging suffragist militants, while allowing Ulster militants to go free.' This she left behind after she left the Gallery. Following the attack the Gallery closed for six weeks and on its reopening security was increased so that it not open after 5 p.m. and was closed all day on Sundays, at the same time enforcing a new rule of 'No muffs, wrist-bags or sticks'. After her arrest Ryland appeared before magistrates on 10 June 1914 for her committal hearing during which she refused to take part in the proceedings and shouted 'No surrender!' as she was taken out of court. She again went on hunger strike while held on remand. Accepting bail, Ryland was too ill to stand trial at the July Assizes after a doctor at Queen's Hospital in Birmingham stated that her attending the hearing would cause her mental condition to deteriorate and she still had not received a sentence when World War I broke out. She suffered permanent kidney damage as a result of her force-feeding in prison.

The July 1914 edition of The Suffragette contained a statement by Ryland about her force-feeding during which she was held down by four prison wardresses and a thick rubber tube forced down her nostril into her throat:

"I resisted, and was seized round the waist by wardresses, and once tied around the waist in the operating chair. This mauling of the unprotected kidney together with the retching and choking, strained and twisted the kidney and caused chronic inflammation... the acute agony, the inevitable retching and choking, and the feeling of suffocation, accompanied by the utter helplessness, all combined to make this the most unutterably hideous experience... I lay in bed practically all the time... feeling too ill and exhausted to do anything. In addition to this feeling of exhaustion there came long periods of mental depression... Besides an unaccountable feeling of misery and depression, my memory seemed to be going, and it was a great effort to think clearly or fix my attention on anything... the mental anguish caused by forcible feeding is, of course, quite indescribable."

== Later years ==
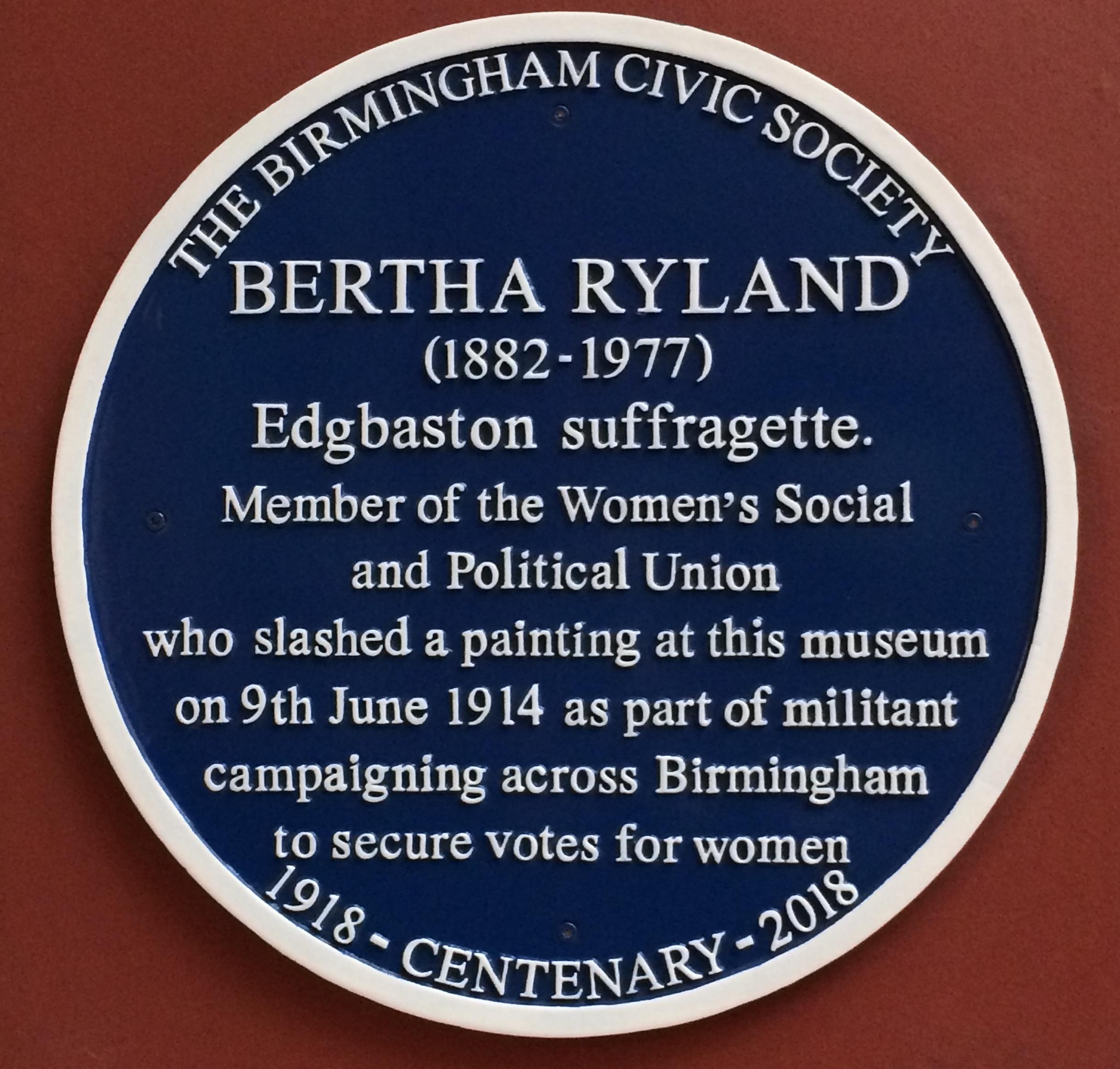
Blue plaque at the Birmingham Museum and Art Gallery commemorating Ryland.

In 1939 Ryland was living in a guest house in Stroud in Gloucestershire where the register described her as "incapacitated through illness."

She received a 1953 Coronation Medal; this with her Hunger Strike Medal from the WSPU were sold by Christie's in 1999 for £6,325. Bertha Ryland never married and died in Birmingham in April 1977.

In November 2018 in commemoration of her attack a century before a blue plaque was unveiled in her honour by Birmingham Civic Society in the Round Room at Birmingham Museum and Art Gallery. The inscription on the plaque reads: "Bertha Ryland (1882-1977) Edgbaston suffragette. Member of the Women's Social and Political Union who slashed a painting at this museum on 9th June 1914 as part of militant campaigning across Birmingham to secure votes for women".
