= Constance Bryer =

British violinist and suffragette (1870–1952)

- Born: c. July 1870; Islington, London, England
- Died: 12 July 1952 (aged 81 or 82); Dartmouth Park, London, England
- Occupations: classical violinist and suffragette
- Organisation(s): Women's Social and Political Union (WSPU); Church League for Women's Suffrage

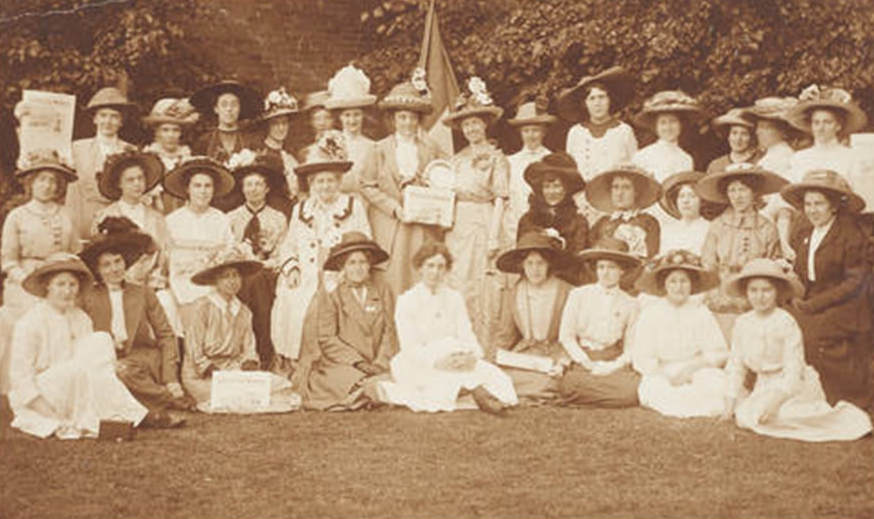
Miss Adams and Constance Bryer released from prison

Constance Elizabeth Bryer (c. July 1870 – 12 July 1952) was a British classical violinist and campaigner for women's rights, an activist and suffragette who during her imprisonment in Holloway Prison went on hunger strike as a consequence of which she was force-fed.

== Early life and family ==
Constance Bryer was born in Islington in London in 1870, the eldest of seven children born to Thomas John Bryer (1844–1916), a bullion merchant, and Elizabeth Butler Bryer (née Chadwick; 1847–1937). In 1908, she was a violinist living in the family home at 49 Tufnell Park Road in London. Her brother, Gilbert William Bryer (1882–1919), served as a gunner with the Royal Garrison Artillery during World War I and died of injuries sustained in service. He is buried in Highgate Cemetery.

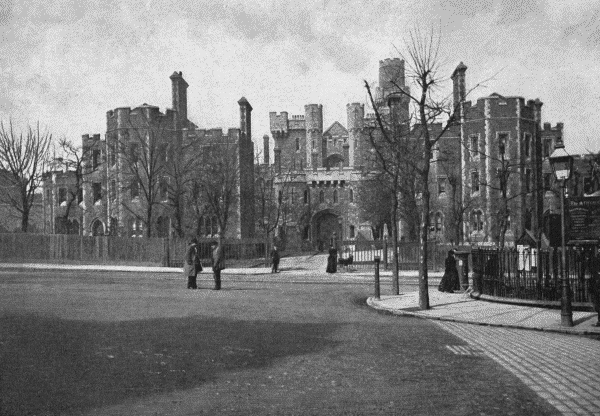
Holloway Prison c. 1896

== Suffrage activity ==
Bryer joined the Women's Social and Political Union (WSPU) and the Church League for Women's Suffrage (CLWS), abandoning her career as a musician to campaign for women's rights. She seems to have come from a musical family for her relative George Bryer was a member of one of the fife and drum bands which took part in the procession for the WSPU's 'Women's Sunday' in June 1908 while her cellist sister Pearl studied under Paderewski.

Between 1911 and 1913 Constance Bryer was the Secretary for the North Islington branch of the WSPU. She was involved in 'Black Friday' in 1910 and was arrested for obstruction but was later discharged. She illegally 'evaded' the 1911 census survey by not being present at her family home at 49 Tuffnell Park Road in London when officials called to record information. In 1911, Bryer was arrested when taking part in a WSPU demonstration against the 'torpedoing' of the Conciliation Bill and for which she was sentenced to five days in prison.

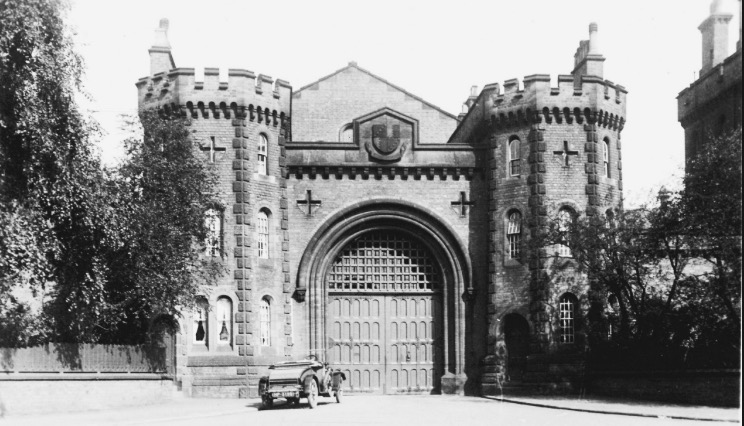
HM Prison Birmingham in the 1920s

In May 1912 Bryer was sentenced to four months in HM Prison Birmingham for breaking windows on Regent Street in London. In prison with her was Olive Wharry, who became her lifelong friend. While on hunger strike there with other suffragette prisoners Bryer wrote a verse and signed her name in an autograph album:

Suffragettes we sit and sew
Sew and sit and sit and sew
Twenty-five are we:
Making shirts and socks for men
Cannot get away from them
Even here you see.

== Later life and death ==
She was made an executor in the will of her friend and fellow suffragette Olive Wharry in which Bryer was left an annuity of £200 together with Wharry's hunger strike medal and some of her etchings and books. Both Wharry and Bryer's hunger strike medals remain together in a private collection.

During World War II she was bombed out of her home and was forced to take rooms on the top floor at 70 Alexandra Road in St John's Wood in London, which she shared with her sister Angela Bryer and where in her later years she was troubled with sciatica. In 1951 she was asked by Adela Verne to play in a concert with her but felt herself to be too out of practice.

Bryer died aged 82 in July 1952 at the Whittington Hospital in Dartmouth Park in London. In her will she left £1,567 16s 6d to her unmarried sisters Emmeline Beatrice Bryer and Evelyn Maude Bryer.
