= Dorothea Waddingham =

English nursing home matron and murderer (1899–1936)

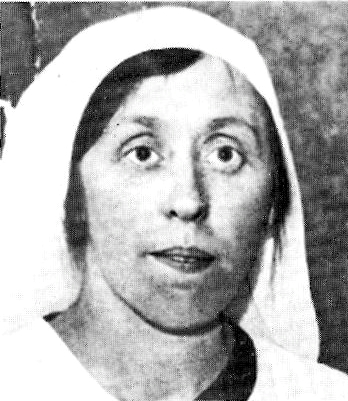
- Born: Dorothy Nancie Merelina Allan Chandler; 21 June 1899; Nottingham, England
- Died: 16 April 1936 (aged 36); HM Prison Birmingham, England
- Occupation: Nursing home matron
- Children: 5
- Status: Executed by hanging
- Conviction: Murder
- Penalty: Death

Dorothea Nancy Waddingham (21 June 1899 – 16 April 1936) was an English nursing home matron who was convicted of murder.

== Life ==
Dorothea Waddingham was born Dorothy Nancie Merelina Allan Chandler, with her parents marrying a year after her birth – Waddingham being her father's surname. Dorothea was born on a farm near Nottingham. She has been referred to as "Nurse" Waddingham because the two murders she was accused and convicted of were committed in a nursing home she ran near Nottingham in England. However, she was not a qualified nurse and the only medical training she received was as a ward-maid at an infirmary near Burton-on-Trent. In 1925, under the name of Dorothea Nancy Waddingham, she married Thomas Willoughby Leech. He was twice her age and dying of cancer. During their marriage, she served two prison terms for fraud and for theft. The couple had three children. Leech died in 1933, at which time Waddingham was seeing a man named Ronald Joseph Sullivan. Sullivan had fought in World War I and had been awarded the Military Medal for gallantry and also served in Ireland after the war. Although they never married, they had two children. Whilst living with Sullivan, she began to take in elderly and infirm patients and turned her home at 32 Devon Drive, Nottingham into a nursing home.

== Activities ==
Mrs. Blagg, the Honorary Secretary of the County Nursing Association, approved of Waddingham's work and arranged for Mrs. Louisa Baguley, who was 88, and her daughter Ada, who had multiple sclerosis or "creeping paralysis" as it was known at the time, to become patients. In February 1935, a patient named Mrs. Kemp died from an illness that required large dosages of morphine, and a quantity of the drug remained on the premises of Waddingham's nursing home after her death.

Ada Baguley had made a will leaving her estate of £1,600 in trust for her mother after her death with the rest to be divided between two cousins, Lawrence Baguley and Fred Gilbert, after her mother died. Ada had been informed that it was likely that she would precede her mothers' death. However, this will was destroyed by Ada in May 1935, and a new will drawn up that left all the money to Dorothea Waddingham and Ronald Sullivan when Ada and her mother both died (in recompense for the nurse's care of them). The elderly Mrs. Baguley died in the second week of May.

Ada lasted through the spring and summer of 1935. On September 10, 1935, Ada received a visit from a family friend, Alice Briggs, who spent an afternoon cheering her up. Briggs told Waddingham that she would have Ada over for tea at her home in a couple of days. The next day, Sullivan advised H. H. Mansfield that his patient Ada was in a coma. Mansfield came and found Ada dead. As this was expected, the doctor was not suspicious, and after gaining further details from Waddingham, he filled out a death certificate stating Ada died of cardiovascular degeneration.

Ada had left instructions to be cremated, and if the cremation had gone through it is probable that Waddingham could not have been proved guilty of Ada's death. However, for a body to be cremated, two doctors were required to sign the death certificate, which could only be done after the family of the deceased was notified. Ada had noted in her will a request not to notify her relatives, and Waddingham said there were no relatives, which was a lie.

The man in charge of cremations was Cyril Banks, who was also the Medical Officer for Health for Nottingham. Banks had never thought highly of Waddingham's so-called "nursing home" and knew there was no state registered nurse on the staff as there should have been. He became suspicious at the note from Ada Baguley that authorised cremation and ordered a post-mortem. The post-mortem found no traces of anything connected to Ada's physical conditions that could have immediately caused death. This led to an analysis of the organs of the deceased by W. W. Taylor, Senior Assistant to the Nottingham Analyst, who found considerable traces of morphine (over three grains) in her stomach, liver, kidneys, and heart.

Suspicions were now raised about the death of Mrs. Baguley and an exhumation was ordered by the Home Office. This was supervised by Dr. Roche Lynch, who found that Luisa Baguley had also died of morphine poisoning. This led to the arrest of Waddingham and Sullivan for the two murders.

== Trial ==
Waddingham's trial started on 4 February 1936 before Justice Rayner Goddard. Her barrister was Mr. Eales, with the prosecution by Norman Birkett (a rarity, for Birkett normally handled criminal defence). Birkett brought out much damaging testimony, including how Ada Baguley's last meal was heavy and rich for a woman in her condition: Waddingham admitted that she gave Ada pork, baked potatoes, kidney beans, and two portions of fruit pie. It was suggested as an effort to disguise the cause of death and showed a lack of concern for the patient's welfare. The result was that Waddingham was convicted of using morphine to poison Mrs. Baguley and Ada. The purported motive behind the murders was to gain the Baguleys' estate. It was also revealed that Waddingham claimed that Dr. Mansfield gave her surplus morphine tablets for Ada Baguley, which that doctor denied. In trial, Sullivan was discharged for insufficient evidence, although the so-called note from Ada Baguley regarding cremation was written by him.

Waddingham was found guilty on 27 February. Despite a recommendation of mercy due to her being a mother of several young children, she was hanged on 16 April 1936, having confessed to the crime shortly before her execution. Her execution was carried out at Winson Green Prison and her hangman was Thomas Pierrepoint, assisted by his nephew Albert Pierrepoint.

Waddingham was a mother of five and was still breastfeeding her 3-month old baby at the time of her execution. 10,000 people gathered outside the gaol to demonstrate against the execution, chanting "Stop this mother murder!" The protests were led by the prominent abolitionist Violet Van der Elst.

The fiancé of Ada Baguley committed suicide after her death.

== Popular culture ==
The execution is dramatised in the 2005 film Pierrepoint, in which Waddingham is played by Elizabeth Hopley. Although the film shows Timothy Spall as Albert Pierrepoint carrying out the execution, in fact the hangman was Thomas Pierrepoint (Albert's uncle); Albert acted as his uncle's assistant. Further, the execution took place at Birmingham's Winson Green prison, not Holloway Prison in London as is implied in the film. The film is also incorrect in that it depicts the execution taking place during the war years.

The case itself is featured on the Investigation Discovery program Deadly Women, appearing as the second of three cases in the tenth-season episode "Cash In".

Her case was examined in Murder, Mystery and My Family in 2019. A judge concluded that her conviction should be upheld.

The case was dramatised in the episode 'Nurse Waddingham' in the 1949-51 radio series Secrets of Scotland Yard.

== Bibliography ==
- O'Donnell, Bernard Should Women Hang? (London: W.H.Allan, 1956) (pp. 88–92: "Women's Murder Weapon" is about poison used by several women poisoners, the first being Waddingham; there is also a photo of her in the book).
- Rowland, John Poisoner In The Dock: Twelve Studies in Poisoning (New York: Archer House – Arco Books, 1960) (pp. 137–157: "Morphine" is about Dorothea Waddingham).
- Wilson, Colin and Pitman, Pat Encyclopedia of Murder (New York: G. P. Putnam's Sons, 1961, 1962) (pp. 533–535: "Waddingham, Dorothea Nancy"
