= All Saints' Hospital, Winson Green =

All Saints' Hospital
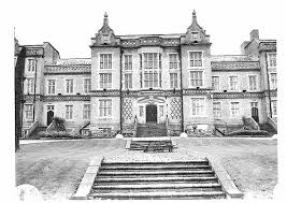
- All Saints' Hospital

- Shown in West Midlands

Geography
- Location: Winson Green, West Midlands, England
- Coordinates: 52.4932°N 1.9359°W

Organisation
- Care system: NHS
- Type: Specialist

Services
- Speciality: Mental health

History
- Founded: 1850
- Closed: 2000

All Saints' Hospital was a mental health hospital and facility in Winson Green, Birmingham, England.

== History ==
All Saints' Hospital was founded in 1847 by Mayor Robert Martineau. It was designed by Daniel Rowlinson Hill (who also designed HM Prison Birmingham) and opened as the Birmingham City Asylum in June 1850. The asylum was run by the Birmingham Lunatic Asylum Committee from 1845 to 1948. The building was repeatedly enlarged in the 1870s to help contain the growing number of pauper inmates, due to the expansion of Birmingham.

Annexes were built at the Leveretts in Handsworth in 1900 and at Glenthorne in Erdington in 1902. The facility became Birmingham City Asylum in the early 20th century.

It joined the National Health Service as Birmingham Mental Hospital in 1949. Following the introduction of Care in the Community in the early 1980s, the hospital went into a period of decline and eventually closed on 12 April 2000. Although the accommodation blocks have been demolished, the main building now forms offices for HM Prison Birmingham. The other hospital buildings were demolished and the main building is positioned outside the large perimeter walls of the prison.
