= Winson Green railway station =

Former railway station in England

Winson Green

General information
- Location: Winson Green, Birmingham; England
- Coordinates: 52.4890°N 1.9371°W
- Grid reference: SP043879
- Platforms: 2

Other information
- Status: Disused

History
- Pre-grouping: London and North Western Railway
- Post-grouping: London, Midland and Scottish Railway

Key dates
- 1 November 1876: Opened
- 26 August 1957: Closed
Location

Winson Green railway station was a railway station in Birmingham, England, built by the London and North Western Railway on their Stour Valley Line in 1876. It served the Winson Green area of Birmingham.

Showell's Dictionary of Birmingham, discussing railway accidents in the city, notes that:

Mr. Pipkins, Stationmaster at Winson Green, was killed Jan. 2. 1877.

but does not elaborate as to the circumstances.

The station closed in 1957, although the Rugby–Birmingham–Stafford line loop from the West Coast Main Line still runs through the site of the station today.

There is some evidence of the station on the ground today, as the two tracks running currently through the site of the station split at the location of an island platform.

The station was not the only one to bear the name. Following the closure of Winson Green station, the nearby Soho and Winson Green station was renamed Winson Green in 1965. However it too was closed in 1972. The site of the latter is now partly occupied by the Soho Benson Road tram stop on the Midland Metro.

Preceding station	Disused railways	Following station
Soho	London and North Western Railway; Stour Valley Line	Monument Lane
