= Winson Green =

Inner-city area of Birmingham, England

Coordinates: 52.4944°N 1.9408°W

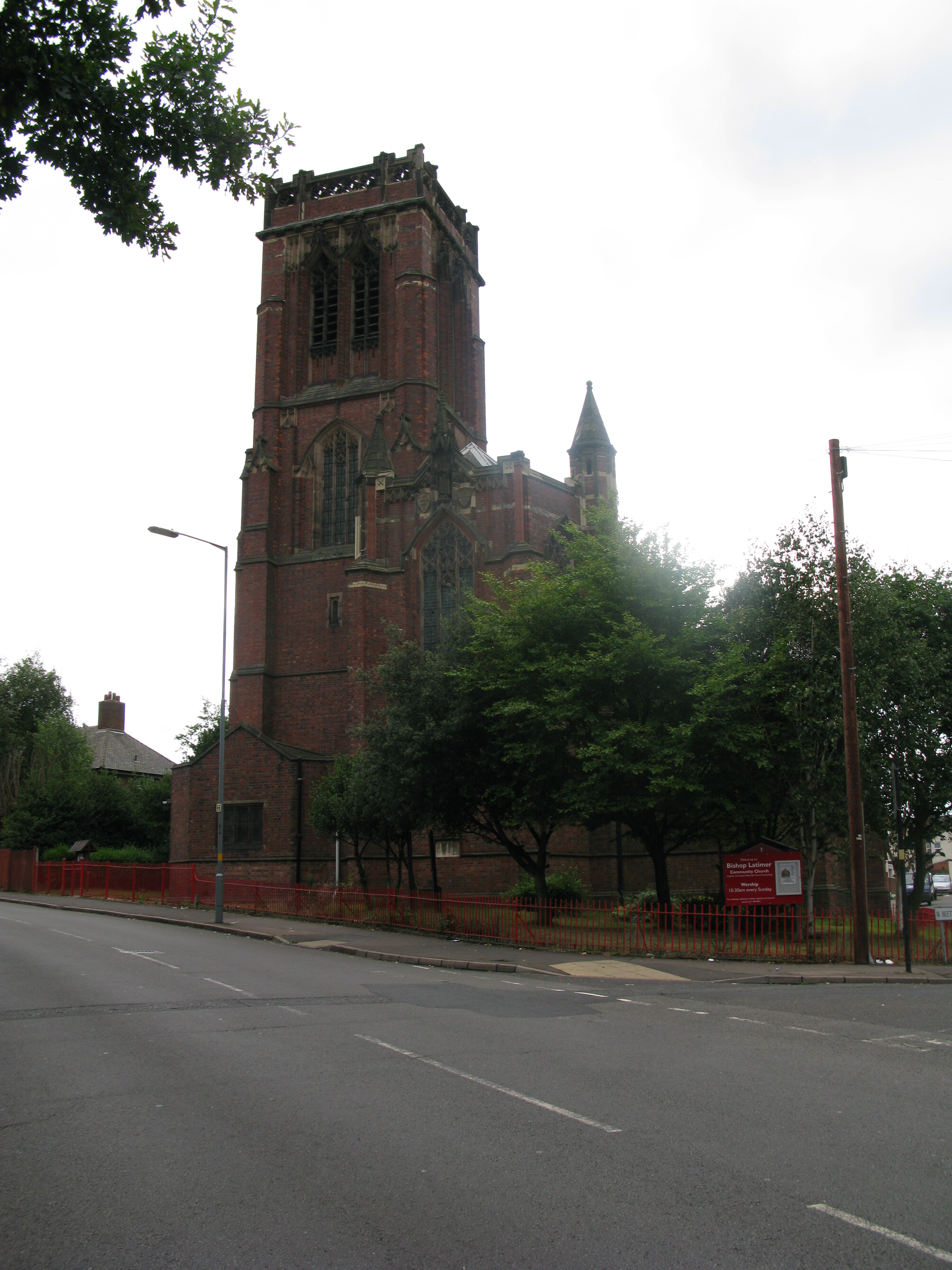
- Bishop Latimer Memorial Church

- Location within the West Midlands
- Language: English
- Metropolitan borough: Birmingham
- Metropolitan county: West Midlands
- Region: West Midlands
- Country: England
- Sovereign state: United Kingdom
- Post town: Birmingham
- Postcode district: B18
- Dialling code: 0121

Winson Green is a loosely defined inner-city area in the west of the city of Birmingham, England. It is part of the ward of Soho. Historically much of the area was occupied by Birmingham Heath, an area of agriculturally poor and undeveloped land enclosed in 1798.

It is the location of HM Prison Birmingham (known locally as Winson Green Prison or "the Green") and of City Hospital (formerly Dudley Road Hospital) as well as of the former All Saints' Hospital.

The area has a diverse multi-racial population, including large Afro-Caribbean and Asian communities. There is a nearby large Tesco supermarket and attached Victorian library, Spring Hill Library.

== 2011 rioting ==
The area was the scene of a riot on the evening of 9 August 2011, one of many to hit England at the time. Three men defending properties along Dudley Road were run over and killed by a car. They were Haroon Jahan (aged 21), Shahzad Ali (aged 30) and Abdul Musavir (aged 31). The father of Jahan appeared on national television the following day and called for the rioting to stop. The alleged driver and passengers of the car were later acquitted in court.

== Benefits Street ==
One of its streets, James Turner Street, was the location of Benefits Street, which caused controversy when it was broadcast in 2014 due to it showing a cannabis farm and instructions on how to avoid detection during shoplifting.

== Transport ==
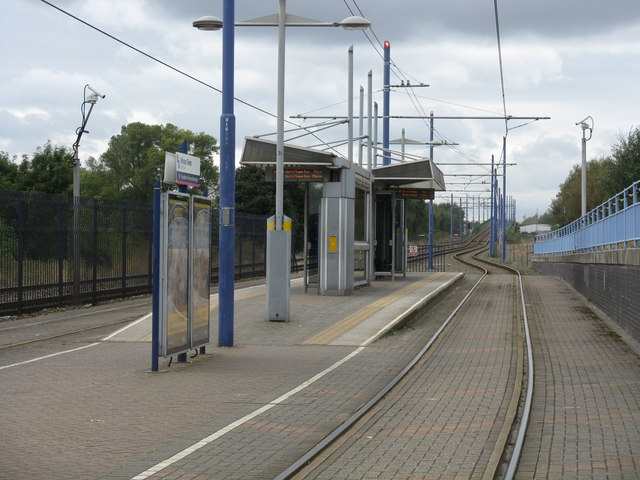
Winson Green Outer Circle tram stop on West Midlands Metro Line 1.

The Birmingham Canal Navigations Main Line Canal passes through the area, as does the former London, Midland & Scottish Railway main line between Birmingham and Wolverhampton. The West Midlands Metro has a stop at Winson Green Outer Circle, connecting with West Midlands bus route 11.

Railway stations which once served the area included Winson Green (built by the London & North Western Railway) and Soho & Winson Green (Great Western Railway). Both have since been demolished.

== Nearby ==
- Black Patch Park
- Handsworth
- Ladywood
- Hockley
