= Sentimentality =

Tender emotional response disproportionate to the situation at hand

Sentimentality originally indicated the reliance on feelings as a guide to truth, but in current usage the term commonly connotes a reliance on shallow, uncomplicated emotions at the expense of reason.

Sentimentalism in philosophy is a view in meta-ethics according to which morality is somehow grounded in moral sentiments or emotions. Sentimentalism in literature refers to techniques a writer employs to induce a tender emotional response disproportionate to the situation at hand (and thus to substitute heightened and generally uncritical feeling for normal ethical and intellectual judgments). The term may also characterize the tendency of some readers to invest strong emotions in trite or conventional fictional situations.

"A sentimentalist", Oscar Wilde wrote, "is one who desires to have the luxury of an emotion without paying for it." In James Joyce's Ulysses, Stephen Dedalus sends Buck Mulligan a telegram that reads "The sentimentalist is he who would enjoy without incurring the immense debtorship for a thing done." James Baldwin considered that "Sentimentality, the ostentatious parading of excessive and spurious emotion, is the mark of dishonesty, the inability to feel...the mask of cruelty". This Side of Paradise by F. Scott Fitzgerald contrasts sentimentalists and romantics, with Amory Blaine telling Rosalind, "I'm not sentimental—I'm as romantic as you are. The idea, you know, is that the sentimental person thinks things will last—the romantic person has a desperate confidence that they won't."

== 18th-century origins ==
In the mid-18th century, a querulous lady had complained to Richardson: "What, in your opinion, is the meaning of the word sentimental, so much in vogue among the polite...Everything clever and agreeable is comprehended in that word...such a one is a sentimental man; we were a sentimental party". What she was observing was the way the term was becoming a European obsession—part of the Enlightenment drive to foster the individual's capacity to recognise virtue at a visceral level. Everywhere in the sentimental novel or the sentimental comedy, "lively and effusive emotion is celebrated as evidence of a good heart". Moral philosophers saw sentimentality as a cure for social isolation; and Adam Smith indeed considered that "the poets and romance writers, who best paint...domestic affections, Racine and Voltaire; Richardson, Maurivaux and Riccoboni; are, in such cases, much better instructors than Zeno" and the Stoics.

By the close of the 18th century, however, a reaction had occurred against what had come to be considered sentimental excess, by then seen as false and self-indulgent Schiller, in a 1795 essay, divided poets into two classes, the "naive" and the "sentimental"—regarded respectively as natural (the respected ancient Greek mode, but largely unattainable in the late 18th century) and as artificial (modern 18th century man's inescapably strained and artificial perception/sensing of "the natural" as an object).

Schiller, however, believed that it was very difficult to wilfully (and successfully) write in the "natural" mode, which was a mode that was largely involuntary and situational, and mostly belonged to the ancient Greeks and Shakespeare—and the past. He and his contemporary authors ("we") had a "sentimental" feeling for nature or the natural that was, of social or historical necessity, like a sick person perceiving health ("Unser Gefühl für Natur gleicht der Empfindung des Kranken für die Gesundheit").

== Modern times ==
In modern times "sentimental" is a pejorative term that has been casually applied to works of art and literature that exceed the viewer or reader's sense of decorum—the extent of permissible emotion—and standards of taste: "excessiveness" is the criterion. The philosopher William James harshly criticized the "nerveless sentimentalist." "Meretricious" and "contrived" sham pathos are the hallmark of sentimentality, where the morality that underlies the work is both intrusive and pat.

"Sentimentality often involves situations which evoke very intense feelings: love affairs, childbirth, death", but where the feelings are expressed with "reduced intensity and duration of emotional experience...diluted to a safe strength by idealisation and simplification".

Nevertheless, as a social force sentimentality is a hardy perennial, appearing for example as "'Romantic sentimentality...in the 1960s slogans 'flower power' and 'make love not war'". The 1990s public outpouring of grief at the death of Diana, "when they go on about fake sentimentality in relation to Princess Diana", also raised issues about the "powerful streak of sentimentality in the British character"—the extent to which "sentimentality was a grand old national tradition".

Baudrillard has cynically attacked the sentimentality of Western humanitarianism, suggesting that "in the New Sentimental Order, the affluent become consumers of the 'ever more delightful spectacle of poverty and catastrophe, and of the moving spectacle of our own attempts to alleviate it'". There is also the issue of what has been called "indecent sentimentality...[in] pornographical pseudo-classics", so that one might say for example that "Fanny Hill is a very sentimental novel, a faked Eden".

However, in sociology it is possible to see the "sentimental tradition" as extending into the present-day—to see, for example, "Parsons as one of the great social philosophers in the sentimental tradition of Adam Smith, Burke, McLuhan, and Goffman...concerned with the relation between the rational and sentimental bases of social order raised by the market reorientation of motivation". Francis Fukuyama takes up the theme through the exploration of "society's stock of shared values as social capital".

In a "subjective confession" of 1932, Ulysses: a Monologue, the analytic psychologist Carl Jung anticipates Baudrillard when he writes: "Think of the lamentable role of popular sentiment in wartime! Think of our so-called humanitarianism! The psychiatrist knows only too well how each of us becomes the helpless but not pitiable victim of his own sentiments. Sentimentality is the superstructure erected upon brutality. Unfeelingness is the counter-position and inevitably suffers from the same defects." [Carl Jung: The Spirit in Man, Art and Literature, London: Routledge, 2003, p. 143]

== Dissensions ==
Complications enter into the ordinary view of sentimentality, however, when changes in fashion and setting— the "climate of thought"—intrude between the work and the reader. The view that sentimentality is relative is inherent in John Ciardi's "sympathetic contract", in which the reader agrees to join with the writer when approaching a poem. The example of the death of Little Nell in Charles Dickens' The Old Curiosity Shop (1840–41), "a scene that for many readers today might represent a defining instance of sentimentality", brought tears to the eye of many highly critical readers of the day. The reader of Dickens, Richard Holt Hutton observed, "has the painful impression of pathos feasting upon itself."

1990s feminist theory clarified the use of the term as it applies to the genre "of the sentimental novel, stressing the way that 'different cultural assumptions arising from the oppression of women gave liberating significance to the works' piety and mythical power to the ideals of the heroines".

== Sentimental fallacy ==
The sentimental fallacy is an ancient rhetorical device that attributes human emotions, such as grief or anger, to the forces of nature. This is also known as the pathetic fallacy, "a term coined by John Ruskin ... for the practice of attributing human emotions to the inanimate or unintelligent world"—as in "the sentimental poetic trope of the 'pathetic fallacy', beloved of Theocritus, Virgil and their successors" in the pastoral tradition.

The term is also used more indiscriminately to discredit any argument as being based on a misweighting of emotion: "sentimental fallacies...that men, that we, are better—nobler—than we know ourselves to be"; "the 'sentimental fallacy' of constructing novels or plays 'out of purely emotional patterns'".

== See also ==
- Jean-Jacques Rousseau
- Kitsch
- Noble savage
- Nostalgia
- Sense and Sensibility
- Sentimental Education
- Spoilt Rotten
- The Sentimental Agents in the Volyen Empire
