= Spoilt Rotten =

2010 book by Theodore Dalrymple

Spoilt Rotten: The Toxic Cult of Sentimentality
- Front cover of the 2010 edition
- Author: Theodore Dalrymple
- Language: English
- Subject: Sentimentality
- Genre: Cultural studies, polemics
- Publisher: Gibson Square Books Ltd
- Publication date: 29 July 2010
- Publication place: United Kingdom
- Pages: 256
- ISBN: 1-906142-61-0

Spoilt Rotten: The Toxic Cult of Sentimentality (subtitle in US editions: How Britain is Ruined by Its Children) is a non-fiction book by the British writer and retired doctor and psychiatrist Theodore Dalrymple, originally published in 2010. Polemical in nature, the book contends that sentimentality has become culturally entrenched in British society, with harmful consequences. The author uses a range of cultural, educational, political, media and literary issues—including falling standards in education, UK aid policies for African development, the death of Diana, Princess of Wales, the disappearance of Madeleine McCann, and the work and life of Sylvia Plath—to illustrate what he sees as the danger of abandoning logic in favour of sentimentality, which he describes as "the progenitor, the godparent, the midwife of brutality". Much of Dalrymple's analysis is underpinned by his experience of working with criminals and the mentally ill.

Spoilt Rotten received a mostly favourable reception in the media. Dalrymple was praised for carrying out a thought-provoking and convincing analysis of a newly emerged cultural phenomenon which sees emotion substituted for reason. Some critics, however, accused the author of cynicism and misanthropic pessimism in his approach, and the historian Noel Malcolm claimed that Dalrymple had overreached in his analysis.

== Background ==
Before the book's publication, Dalrymple had alluded on a number of occasions in his writing to the issue of sentimentality in contemporary society.

In an essay in 1999, he identified what he saw as the harmful role played by sentimentality in a case involving Stephen Lawrence. Lawrence, a young black British man, was murdered and the subsequent case was mired in accusations of racism among the investigating police. Dalrymple wrote that "the response to the Stephen Lawrence case is another example of how the rule of law is to be supplanted by the rule of sentiment—and it is yet one more instance of what one might call the Dianafication of British public life, in which transitory popular enthusiasm trumps venerable tradition". In a 2004 essay, he analysed how sentimentality towards children was closely linked with violence and neglect, particularly in the poorest sections of British society: "The upbringing of children in much of Britain is a witches' brew of sentimentality, brutality, and neglect, in which overindulgence in the latest fashions, toys, or clothes, and a television in the bedroom are regarded as the highest—indeed only—manifestations of tender concern for a child's welfare".

Before the book's publication, Dalrymple analysed two high-profile cases in the British media involving Raoul Moat and Jon Venables.

To make up for its lack of a moral compass, the British public is prey to sudden gusts of kitschy sentimentality followed by vehement outrage, encouraged by the cheap and cynical sensationalism of its press. Spasms of self-righteousness are its substitute for the moral life.

— Dalrymple, writing in 2004

Dalrymple described Moat as "a brutal sentimentalist. He used the extremity of his behaviour to persuade himself that he felt something—supposedly love—very deeply, and that this was the motive and justification of his behaviour". Referring to Venables, Dalrymple wrote, "Probation officers persistently refused to see the writing on Venables's wall. They explained away the obvious signs of his continuing bad character. Just a little more kindness, understanding. What contempt he must have felt! Thus sentimentality, a refusal to face unpleasant realities, causes crime".

== Synopsis ==
=== Chapter One: Sentimentality ===
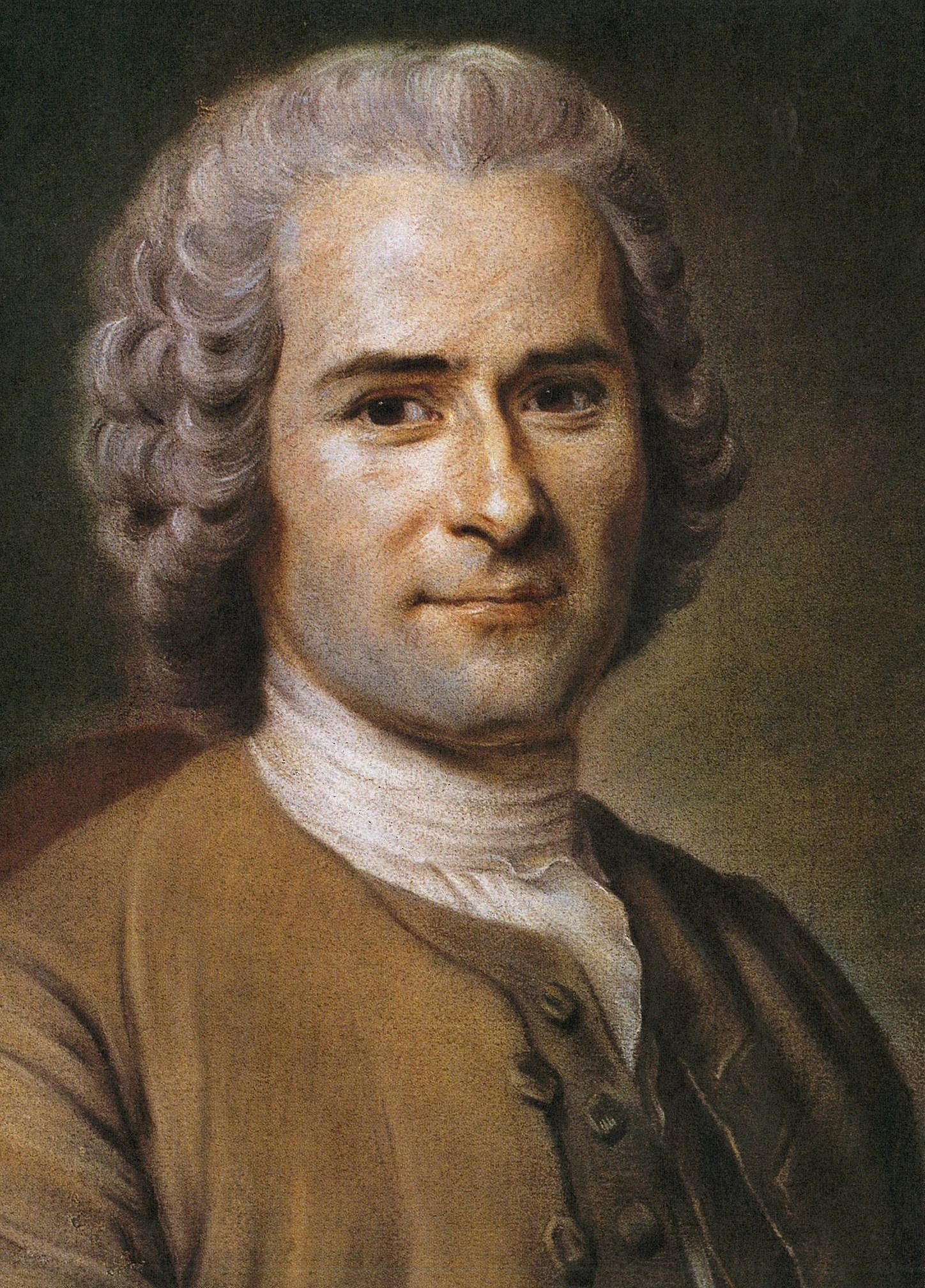
Jean-Jacques Rousseau

Dalrymple begins the chapter by citing several examples to illustrate how sentimentality is increasing as a cultural phenomenon in the United Kingdom. He then analyses falling education standards in the country, and links these trends to "powerful intellectual currents" that "feed into the great Sargasso Sea of modern sentimentality about children", and asserts that in this regard the ideas of the philosopher Jean Jacques Rousseau and the psychologist Steven Pinker have been particularly influential. He then examines a newspaper article which advocates reform of the British prison system. Dalrymple states that the article aroused an emotion "whose effect, if not its intention, was to convince the person experiencing it that he was a person of superior sensibility and compassion", and that such emotionality "often attaches to the question of crime and punishment in contemporary Britain". Dalrymple also cites a modern tendency for criminals under the influence of drugs or alcohol not to be held morally responsible for their crimes. Dalrymple takes issue with this, and agrees with Aristotle that a man is doubly culpable: first for the offence committed, and second for having intoxicated himself. Dalrymple also maintains that it is "the sheerest sentimentality to see drug addicts as the victims of an illness" and that, "sentimentality is now a mass phenomenon almost beyond criticism or even comment".

=== Chapter Two: What is Sentimentality? ===
Dalrymple advances that the kind of sentimentality that he wishes to draw attention to is "an excess of emotion that is false, mawkish, and over-valued by comparison with reason" and which is performed "in full public view". Dalrymple contends that "Sentimentality is the expression of emotion without judgment. Perhaps it is worse than that: it is the expression of emotion without an acknowledgement that judgment should enter into how we should react to what we see and hear. It is the manifestation of a desire for the abrogation of an existential condition of human life, namely the need to always and never unendingly to exercise judgment. Sentimentality is therefore childish and reductive of our humanity". In this chapter he also takes issue with a number of assertions made by the philosopher Robert C. Solomon, including that sentimentality does not manipulate emotions, cause false emotions to be shown, or distort perception and interfere with rational thought.

=== Chapter Three: The Family Impact Statement ===
Dalrymple criticises the introduction by Harriet Harman of the Family Impact Statement. Dalrymple writes that such statements "are not permitted to influence the outcome of a case. They are made only after a jury has made its verdict". As a result, kitsch displays of emotion are encouraged in court, of no practical benefit.

=== Chapter Four: The Demand for Public Emotion ===
Dalrymple analyses the media attention and reaction to the disappearance of Madeleine McCann, and how certain media interpreted a perceived lack of emotion on the part of the girl's parents as evidence of guilt. Dalrymple writes that the "demand that emotion should be shown in public, or be assumed not to exist and therefore indicate a guilty mind, is now not an uncommon one", and cites two similar cases involving Joanne Lees and Lindy Chamberlain. Dalrymple then analyses the outcry from the public and the media to the lack of emotion shown by the Queen after the death of Princess Diana, and contends that "the tabloid newspapers carried out what can only be called a campaign of bullying against the sovereign" and that those gathered outside Buckingham Palace were "bullying rather than expressing any genuine grief". He concludes by asserting that the sentimentality shown by both the media and the public "was inherently dishonest in a way that parallels the dishonesty that lies behind much sentimentality itself".

=== Chapter Five: The Cult of the Victim ===
Dalrymple analyses the poet Sylvia Plath, whom he describes as the "patron saint of self-dramatization", and interprets Margaret Drabble's descriptions of Plath as a "willing casualty" and "supremely vulnerable" to mean "virtues of a high order". He then examines how Plath blamed her father for her suffering, and identifies him in her poem "Daddy" with Nazism and makes allusions to the Holocaust. Dalrymple writes that "Plath felt it right to allude to one of the worst and most deliberate inflictions of mass-suffering in the whole of human history, merely on the basis that her father, who died when she was young, was German…the metaphorical use of the holocaust measures not the scale of her suffering, but of her self-pity". He asserts that before Plath, self-pity "was regarded as a vice, even a disgusting one, that precluded sympathy", and that "the appropriation of the suffering of others to boost the scale and significance of one's own suffering is now a commonplace." He then analyses a number of figures, including Binjamin Wilkomirski and Margaret Seltzer, who he alleges "make bogus claims to victim status" and whose stories reveal perfectly "the dialectic between sentimentality and brutality". Dalrymple ends the chapter by analysing victimhood in the criminal justice system and concludes, "For the sentimentalist, of course, there is no such thing as a criminal, only an environment that has let him down".

=== Chapter Six: Make Poverty History! ===
Dalrymple asserts that across the globe chronic poverty has decreased in the past twenty-five years, but mainly in China and India. As a result, "Africa is an exception and therefore is the current focus of sentimentality about poverty". In this context he examines Gordon Brown's desire as prime minister to ensure that every child in Africa receive a primary education. Dalrymple questions whether there is a link between improving educational standards and increasing economic growth in the continent, and cites the experience of Tanzania under Julius Nyerere, Equatorial Guinea under Macias Nguema, and Sierra Leone's fate after a "long history of historical effort and achievement" as evidence that this may not be so, and argues that Africa's priority is access to markets. Dalrymple concludes that Brown's position is pure sentimental posturing and smacks of "Singerian moral universalism", which is "preposterous—psychologically, theoretically, and practically".

In the book's Conclusion, Dalrymple contends that "in field after field, sentimentality has triumphed", and this has had a number of harmful consequences, including the lives of millions of children being blighted by overindulgence and neglect; the destruction of educational standards; and brutality wherever policies suggested by sentimentality have been advocated.

== Release ==
The book was originally published in the UK in hardback on 29 July 2010 by Gibson Square Books Ltd. The book had at least one alternative subtitle before The Toxic Cult of Sentimentality was finally chosen, and the US edition had the subtitle How Britain is Ruined by Its Children. The book's front cover featured a wrongly attributed comment, "a taboo-shattering, sacred cow-slaughtering, myth-destroying little gem of a book" by Dominic Lawson; Lawson had in fact written this in 2007 in a review of another Dalrymple US-published book, Romancing Opiates: Pharmacological Lies and the Addiction Bureaucracy. The paperback edition of Spoilt Rotten appeared in the UK on 11 August 2011.

== Critical reception ==
After it was released the book received a mostly positive response in the media.

In The Spectator, Jonathan Sumption praised the book, writing "The public hysteria surrounding such high-profile incidents as the death of the Princess of Wales and the search for Madeleine McCann, or the eccentricities of the MacPherson report on the death of Stephen Lawrence are analysed with the author's customary mixture of shrewdness, cynicism and misanthropic pessimism. These phenomena have of course been analysed before, and many of the same points have been made. But Dalrymple is good at relating them to broader trends in our society". The book was described by Toby Young in The Daily Telegraph as being an "excellent new book attacking the cult of sentimentality" and that Dalrymple also "makes a convincing case that standards in British education have plummeted in the last few decades". Young also reviewed the book on his blog No Sacred Cows, where he wrote, "...the remarkable thing about Spoilt Rotten is that Dalrymple never lets his anger obscure his compassion. Throughout the book you get a powerful sense that his outrage is rooted in a commitment to social justice. Yes, he believes members of the underclass should be weaned off the nanny state and forced to take responsibility for themselves, but he also believes it is left-wing intellectuals who have reduced them to a state of helpless infantalism, mainly through the promotion of the cult of sentimentality. He is not a Christian, but believes that it is only when Britain's benefit dependents rediscover the doctrine of Original Sin that they will be able to help themselves".

Also in The Daily Telegraph, Ed West gave the book a favourable review, writing "Sentimentality, in which crude emotion replaces dispassionate analysis, affects all aspects of public life, such as the debates over education, prison places and overseas aid. As Dalrymple points out, no country has ever escaped poverty via international aid—but never mind, since what matters is not actually doing anything about state education or crime or Africa, but being seen to be caring about the 'vulnerable'". The book was listed as a non-fiction choice by Steven Poole in The Guardian, who wrote, "Dalrymple alternates vague ranting with surgical demolition (he is excellent on the fatuity of 'family impact statements' in court), and exhibits impressive thrift, in these uncertain times, with his research, getting tens of pages out of a single visit to WHSmith and the purchase of two newspapers. Perhaps the most suggestive sentence is tucked away in an endnote about tattoos: 'I wish I had the space to elaborate on the dermatological semiotics of violence in England'. If only someone had awarded him that space". The book was also the subject of a spoof review by John Crace in The Guardian, which satirised the book and its author.

Spoilt Rotten was chosen by Jasper Fforde on the Penguin Books website as one of the books he would most like to get for Christmas. Fforde wrote that the book, "makes uneasy reading for huggy liberals, and asks harsh questions over the bizarre sense of sentimentality that seems to have befuddled us Brits ever since millions of us queued up to sign a book of condolences for a princess we didn't know. Dalrymple looks at the downside of an overblown sense of sentiment, which resulted this year with a murderous thug who saw himself as a victim and found 32,000 people agreeing with him, and even opening a tribute Facebook page in his posthumous honor". A positive review in The Scotsman stated, "Dalrymple tackles sentimentality on every front. He is frequently witty, always punchy and sometimes rapier-like, as he analyses the 'bunk' of his opponents to within an inch of its cant".

In a negative review in The Sunday Telegraph, historian Noel Malcolm suggested that Dalrymple "is spreading his net too widely, so that 'sentimentality' comes to stand for any moralising view that does not satisfy his own scrutiny; it's not that these things should not be criticised, merely that sentimentalism may not be the key to what is wrong with them". Malcolm also questioned Dalrymple's views on modern educational theory, writing "these ideas have long and complex histories, in which sentimentalism is only part of the story. The 'progressive' attack on discipline, and on traditional institutions such as the family, was concerned as much with power-structures and class as it ever was with sentiment or human goodness", and took issue with Dalrymple's assessment of Rousseau. In a short negative review of the book in The Independent on Sunday, which appeared after the book's 2011 paperback release, Brandon Robshaw wrote, "There is some good sense here, but it's vitiated by the pompous, peevish tone, the futile nostalgia for an airbrushed past, unnecessary sideswipes (at John Rawls, for example, or climate science) and by the poor editing". In an ambivalent review on the website MercatorNet, Francis Phillips wrote "The book leaves one with the impression that it is a somewhat hotchpotch compendium of views and articles already well rehearsed by the author—though nonetheless true for all that. What is disheartening is his bleak attitude towards human nature; having diagnosed the disease he is at a loss to suggest a remedy".

== See also ==
- Call-out culture
- Descartes' Error

== Bibliography ==
- Dalrymple, Theodore (2010). Spoilt Rotten: The Toxic Cult of Sentimentality. Gibson Square Books Ltd. ISBN 978-1-906142-61-2.
