= HM Prison Birmingham =

Prison in Birmingham, England

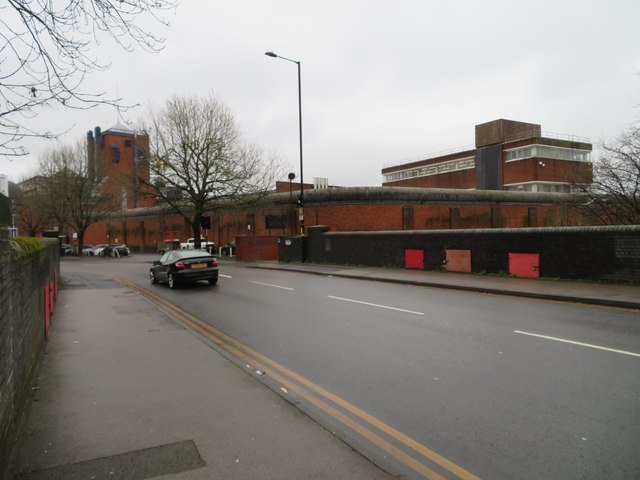
- The prison viewed from Winson Green Road
- Interactive map of HM Prison Birmingham
- Location: Winson Green, Birmingham, West Midlands; 52°29′35.54″N 1°56′14.05″W
- Status: Operational
- Security class: Adult Male/Category B & C
- Capacity: 1,028 (November 2018)
- Opened: 1849
- Managed by: G4S (2011–2018); HM Prison and Probation Service (2018–present)
- Governor: Neil O’Connor

HM Prison Birmingham is a Category B men's prison in the Winson Green area of Birmingham, England, operated by HM Prison and Probation Service.

== History ==
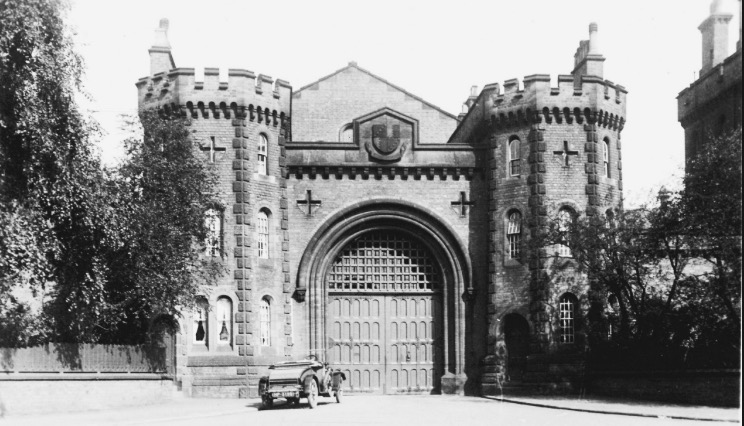
Winson Green Prison in the 1920s

HM Prison Birmingham was formerly called Winson Green Prison. It is a Victorian prison, designed by Daniel Rowlinson Hill, who also designed All Saints' Hospital, which was completed in 1849.

In 1995, Birmingham was criticised by its own Board of Visitors for being soft on prisoners. This arose after allegations that one inmate had gone on two weeks' holiday to Menorca, while being released for weekend leave.

In January 1999 an inspection report by Her Majesty's Chief Inspector of Prisons attacked conditions at Birmingham, describing the health centre in the jail as the "untidiest and dirtiest" inspectors had ever come across. The report also criticised the prison for its lack of a sex offender treatment programme, the lack of employment and education opportunities, and the inadequate bathing arrangements where some inmates were only being allowed a full wash three times a week.

In March 2001 the Chief Inspector declared that conditions had worsened in Birmingham Prison where around 11% of inmates had claimed to have been assaulted by prison officers. One particular incident involved a mentally-disturbed prisoner who had been denied a wash or change of clothes for weeks because staff thought he was faking his illness.

In 2002 the prison was expanded as a result of a multimillion-pound investment programme by the Prison Service. 450 additional prisoner places were added together with new workshops, educational facilities, a new healthcare centre and gym as well as extensions and improvements to existing facilities. Two years later, a report from the Chief Inspector found that conditions at Birmingham had substantially improved, stating that the prison was a place where "positive attitudes are firmly embedded".

In November 2007, the Independent Monitoring Board warned in a report that overcrowding at Birmingham was putting prisoners and staff at risk. The report stated that if overcrowding was not tackled, then there was a potential for unrest. Two years later, the Board issued another report that criticised levels of overcrowding at Birmingham Prison. The report also noted that inmates from the jail were being transferred to prisons farther north, to accommodate increased prisoner levels from the South-East of England.

Birmingham became the first publicly built, owned and operated prison in the UK to be transferred to the private sector. G4S formally took over the day-to-day running of the prison in October 2011. Shortly after taking over the operation of the prison, G4S had to spend £500,000 replacing all the keys and locks in the prison after the master keys went missing.

=== Executions ===
Numerous judicial executions by hanging took place at the prison until the abolition of capital punishment in the UK. The first was that of Henry Kimberley, on 17 March 1885, for the murder of Emma Palmer. During the 20th century, 35 executions took place at Birmingham prison. The last person ever to be hanged at the prison was a 20-year-old Jamaican named Oswald Augustus Grey. He was executed on 20 November 1962 after being convicted of the shooting death of newsagent Thomas Bates during the course of a robbery in Lee Bank Road on 3 June 1962. Christopher Simcox, a double-murderer, was scheduled for execution at Birmingham prison on Tuesday, 17 March 1964, but was reprieved.

List of people executed in Birmingham Prison between 1885 and 1962
Executed person	Age	Date executed	Victim(s)
Henry Kimberley	53	17 March 1885	Emma Palmer
George Nathaniel Daniels	34	28 August 1888	Emma Hastings (21)
Harry Benjamin Jones	25	28 August 1888	Florence Harris, a child
Frederick Davis	40	26 August 1890	his wife
Frederick William Fenton	32	4 April 1894	Florence Elborough (24)
Frank Taylor	21	18 August 1896	Mary Lewis (10)
John Joyce	36	20 August 1901	John Nugent (61)
Charles Samuel Dyer	25	5 April 1904	Martha Eliza Simpson (21, girlfriend)
Samuel Holden	43	16 August 1904	Susan Humphries (35, girlfriend)
Frank Greening	34	13 August 1913	Elizabeth Ellen Hearne (27, girlfriend)
William Allen Butler	39	16 August 1916	Florence Beatrice Butler (29)
Louis Van Der Kerkhove	32	9 April 1918	Clemence Verelst (35, girlfriend)
Henry Thomas Gaskin	27	8 August 1919	Elizabeth Gaskin (23, wife)
Samuel Westwood	26	30 December 1920	Lydia Westwood (24, wife)
Edward O'Connor	43	22 December 1921	Thomas O'Connor (5, son)
Elijah Pountney	48	11 August 1922	Alice Gertrude Pountney (47, wife)
William Rider	40	19 December 1922	Rosilla Patience Barton (24, bigamous wife)
John Fisher	58	5 January 1926	Ada Taylor (56, girlfriend)
George Sharples	20	13 April 1926	Milly Illingworth Crabtree (25)
James Joseph Power	32	31 January 1928	Olive Gordon Turner (18)
Victor Edward Betts	21	3 January 1931	William Thomas Andrews (63)
Jeremiah Hanbury	49	2 February 1933	Jessie Payne (39, girlfriend)
Stanley Eric Hobday	21	29 December 1933	Charles William Fox (24)
Dorothea Nancy Waddingham	36	16 April 1936	Louisa Baguley (89), Ada Baguley (50)
Peter Barnes	32	7 February 1940	Elsie Ansell (21), John Arnott (15), James Clay (81), Rex Gentle (30), and Gwilym Rowland (50)
James McCormick (alias Richards)	29	7 February 1940	Elsie Ansell (21), John Arnott (15), James Clay (81), Rex Gentle (30), and Gwilym Rowland (50)
Eli Richards	45	19 September 1941	Jane Turner (64)
Arthur Peach	23	30 January 1942	Kitty Lyon (18)
Harold Oswald Merry	40	10 September 1942	Joyce Dixon (27, girlfriend)
William Quayle	52	3 August 1943	Vera Clarke (8)
James Farrell	19	29 March 1949	Joan Mary Marney (14)
Piotr Maksimowski	33	29 March 1950	Dilys Doreen Campbell (30, girlfriend)
William Arthur Watkins	49	3 April 1951	Unnamed illegitimate son (newborn)
Horace Carter	31	1 January 1952	Sheila Ethel Attwood (11)
Leslie Green	29	23 December 1952	Alice Wiltshaw (62)
Frederick Arthur Cross	33	26 July 1955	Donald Haywood Lainton (28)
Corbett Montague Roberts	46	2 August 1955	Doris Acquilla Roberts (41, wife)
Ernest Charles Harding	42	9 August 1955	Evelyn Patricia Higgins (10)
Dennis Howard	24	4 December 1957	David Alan Keasey (21)
Matthew Kavanagh	32	12 August 1958	Isaiah Dixon (60)
Oswald Augustus Grey	20	20 November 1962	Thomas Bates (47)

== The prison today ==
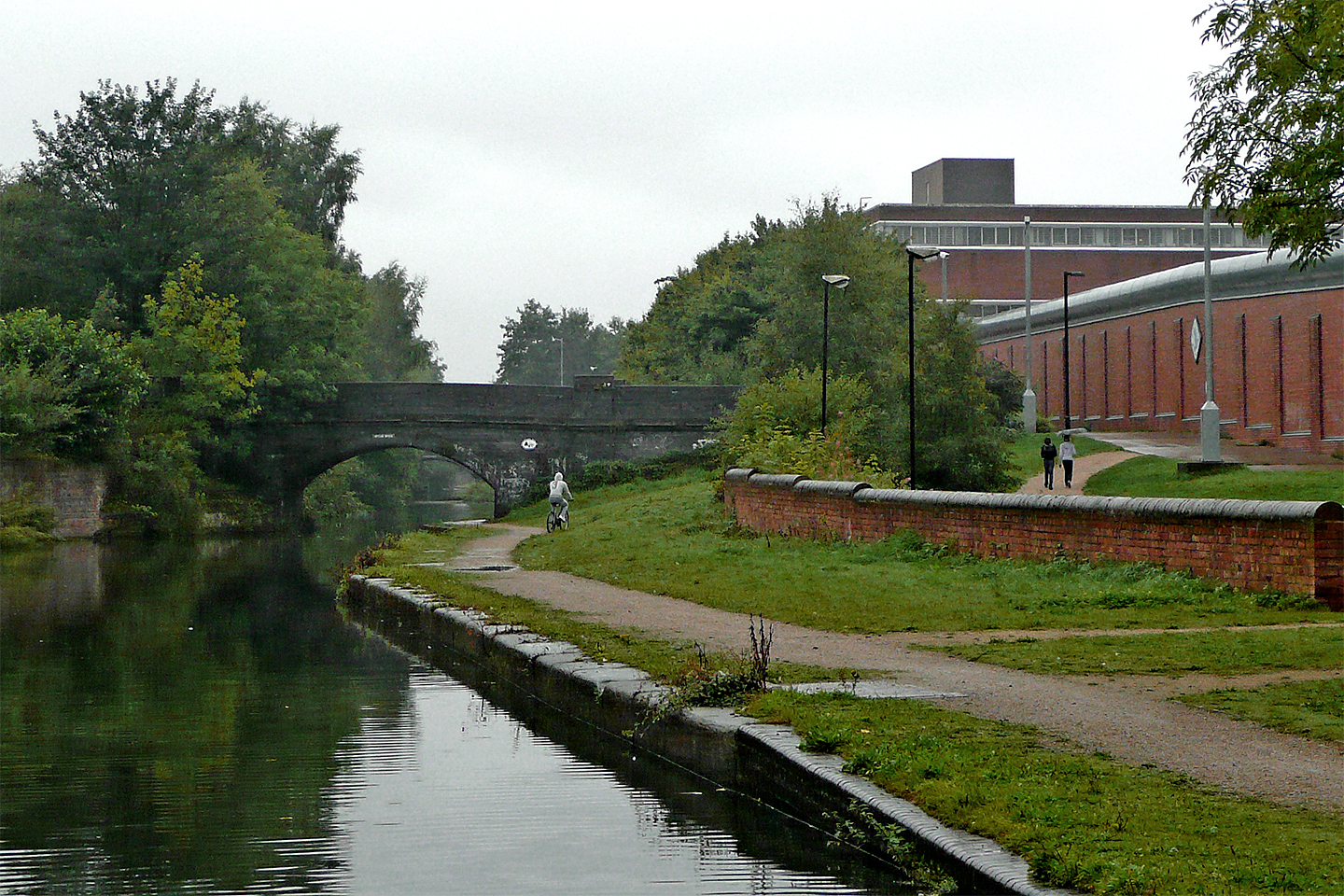
The prison (right) next to the Soho Loop

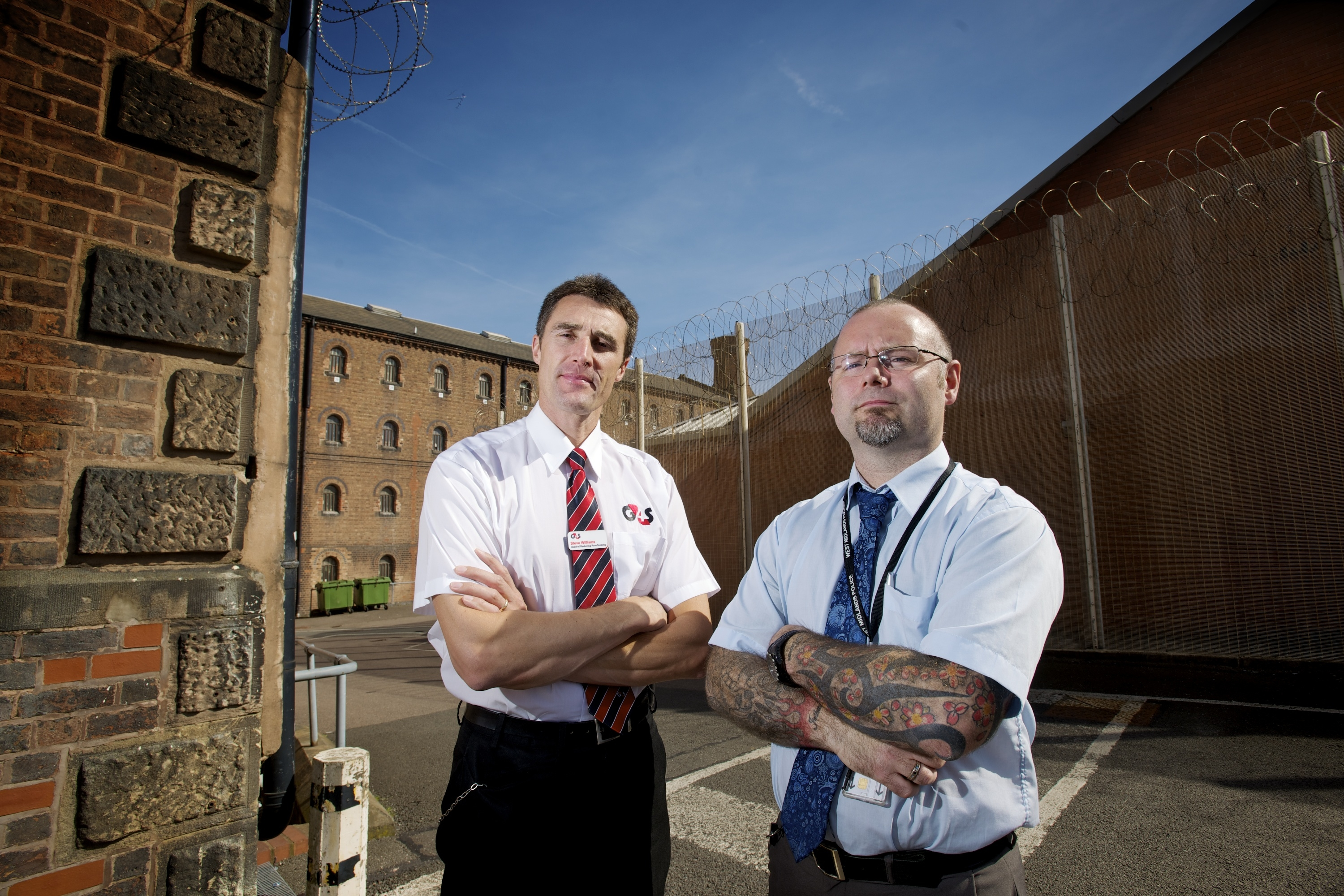
Detective Constable Jim Farrell and HMP Birmingham Prison Director Steve Williams inside the prison in 2012

Birmingham holds adult male prisoners, serving the Crown Court sitting in Birmingham, Stafford and Wolverhampton and the Magistrates' Courts of Birmingham, Wolverhampton and Cannock.

Education and training at Birmingham Prison is provided by NOVUS, part of The Manchester College group. Learning programmes for inmates include basic and key skills, bricklaying, plumbing, painting and decorating, carpentry, joinery, forklift truck training, industrial cleaning, catering, textiles, barbering, information technology, business, creative arts and performing arts. All courses lead to qualifications such as NVQs, and there is the option for further study with the Open University.

The Prison Library Service is provided by Birmingham City Council's Library Services, and all prisoners have access to the service. As well as facilities for independent learners, the library has special collections on law, employment, health, community information, English as a second or other language (ESOL), and basic skills materials. There is also a Learning Centre within the library to provide additional learning support to those with dyslexia and ESOL needs.

Physical education at Birmingham is provided on a daily basis over a 7-day period, and evenings over 5 days. There are a number of sports delivered and also sports related subjects from basic skills to NVQ Level 2 in Sports and Recreation.

Birmingham has a prison chaplaincy with full-time chaplains from the Church of England, Roman Catholic, Free Church and Muslim faiths. There are also sessional staff from the Sikh, Buddhist and Hindu faiths.

Assaults by prisoners have been rising with an average of three assaults a week on staff, some serious. There have also been assaults and serious assaults by prisoners on other prisoners. Drones were used to bring drugs into the prison which Petherick of G4S confirmed.

In June 2016 inspectors said prison violence was increasing because of large amounts of illegal drugs in the prison.

In autumn 2016 concerns were expressed about drugs which can make prisoners violent being smuggled into the prison. Jerry Petherick of G4S who run the prison claimed "a very small minority of staff are corrupt". Petherick also said contraband was brought in by visitors, by drones and was thrown over the walls.

Staff shortages were also problematic influencing efficiency, morale, and wellbeing. Jobs for prison officers at Birmingham Prison were advertised with a starting salary of just under £10 an hour.

=== 2016 prison riot ===
There was reportedly a buildup of frustration by prisoners over prison conditions prior to the riot. Low staff numbers, poor healthcare and nutrition were cited as factors. Also, prisoners being on 'lockdown' in their cells all day was cited as a major contributing factor to the disturbance.

On 16 December 2016, a prison officer was reportedly "rushed" by inmates leading to a rapid escalation of what prison officials described as "trouble". According to a G4S statement, staff retreated from two of the prison's four wings, sealing the abandoned sections before withdrawing. The disturbances, however, subsequently spread to the remaining two wings. According to a different account of events told by a prison affairs blogger quoted by The Guardian, the breakdown in order began after inmates seized control of fire hoses and began breaking lights. Prison staff attempted to lock down inmates in their cells, however, during the operation a governor's keys were stolen, whereupon security staff were ordered to evacuate the wing. An injured prisoner was used as 'bait' to encourage officers to unlock doors.

A Prison Officers Association spokesman described the incident as, "another stark warning to the Ministry of Justice that the service is in crisis". Shadow justice secretary, Richard Burgon said, "This is only the latest in a number of disturbances across the prison estate. The justice secretary is failing to get this crisis under control". Michael Spurr of National Offender Management Service Agency claimed drugs, overcrowding, and reduced staffing had put prisons under pressure.

One inmate in the prison's G wing, which was reserved for sex offenders during the riots, reportedly informed his solicitor that, during the disturbance, rioting inmates had attempted to gain access to that section of the facility and that prisoners were "terrified" they would be attacked.

On Friday evening, specialist riot squads from His Majesty's Prison Service were dispatched to assume control of the situation due to the scale of the disturbance, which had grown to involve more than 600 inmates. By late that day, prison officials were reportedly back in control of the facility. 460 prisoners were moved to other prisons and some caused problems at Hull Prison. The Birmingham riot was described by one source as the worst prison disturbance in a B category prison in the United Kingdom since the 1990 Strangeways Prison riot. The Birmingham riot caused about £2 million worth of damage.

This is the third serious incident within under two months. Riots previously happened at Bedford Prison and Lewes Prison and a subsequent riot happened at Swaleside Prison.

=== After the riot ===
After the riot inspectors found violence and illegal drug use were still problematic. Some prisoners felt unsafe. Prison wings damaged during the riot were not reopened until April 2017. There was a further disturbance in September 2017 Prisoners refused to return to their cells and 28 were subsequently moved.

6 prisoners died from January 2018 to late April 2018, one was from natural causes and the others are under investigation. 7 prisoners died during 2017. One prisoner death was self-inflicted. The Howard League for Penal Reform maintains the figure for deaths is the joint highest in England and Wales in 2018, together with HMP Durham, and considers it "extremely concerning". Roger Swindells, of the Independent Monitoring Board for Birmingham Prison described problems including overcrowding, with prisoners facing cramped conditions in Victorian cells, also cockroach and rat infestations. There is a high rate of sickness among prison officers and the prison has trouble retaining staff.

In August 2018, the government announced they were taking Birmingham prison over because it is in a state of crisis. Peter Clarke, the Chief Inspector of Prisons, maintained some prisoners are afraid to leave their cells and described Birmingham Prison as, "the worst prison he had ever been to." Clarke maintained there was a "dramatic deterioration" in conditions after the 2016 riot and reported there was a lack of order, where violent people could act with "near impunity". Some staff locked themselves in their offices, and parts of the prison were filthy, with blood, vomit and rat droppings on the floor. Clarke described an, "abject failure" to manage and deliver the contract at Birmingham. Clarke wrote, "The inertia that seems to have gripped both those monitoring the contract and delivering it on the ground has led to one of Britain's leading jails slipping into a state of crisis that is remarkable even by the low standards we have seen all too frequently in recent years." In 2017 1,147 assaults including fights were recorded at the prison. This was higher than for any other prison in England or Wales that year and five times higher than 2012, the first complete year that G4S ran the prison.

Prisoners effectively ran some wings, staff were afraid to leave their offices, inspectors and NHS staff felt unable to enter some wings due to large amounts of drugs in the atmosphere affecting them. Rory Stewart maintains more should be done to prevent drugs like spice getting into the prison as these drugs cause, "crazy aggressive behaviour". Steve Gillan of the Prison Officers Association stated, "The secretary of state needs to resign and there now needs to be a full public inquiry into the prison system in England and Wales. We cannot continue like this. Government should now halt any other intention to privatise. The warning signs have been at Birmingham for all to see yet ministers have buried their heads in the sand and chosen to ignore it. They knew Birmingham was struggling before and after the riot [in December 2016] yet chose to do nothing". Gillan maintained prisons were being privatised for ideological reasons.

Clarke refers to the "disturbing case" of a troubled prisoner with personal hygiene problems who was "soaked" with water from a fire hose by other prisoners. Clarke said, "We struggle to understand how staff could have allowed this appalling bullying to take place." Inspectors found a further "distressed" prisoner who sat on "scruffy material on the springs of his bed" since the mattress was stolen three days before. Clarke maintains this indicates the, "day-to-day vulnerability" of some prisoners. Clarke maintained further, "It was often difficult to find officers, although we did find some asleep during prisoner lock-up periods," and added that "ineffective frontline management and leadership" were basic to the prison's problems.

Prisoners did little to conceal use of psychoactive substances or trade in those substances and staff accepted the situation. Prisoners who had taken spice walked around like zombies. There had been three "likely" drug-related deaths since the previous inspection. It had been noted that spice and similar drugs were available at Birmingham Prison. Inspectors stated, "We witnessed many prisoners under the influence of drugs and some openly using and trafficking drugs around the prison. Incidents involving new psychoactive substances (NPS) were routine and we often smelt cannabis on the wings. Shockingly, staff were too often ambivalent and accepting of such incidents." Other findings were, the prison was "exceptionally violent and fundamentally unsafe", many prisoners and staff lived and worked in fear, frightened, vulnerable prisoners segregated themselves in locked cells but faeces and urine were thrown through their door panels, prisoners could misbehave, "with near impunity", many prisoners were living in, "squalor and little was done to adequately occupy them, leaving many simply to mill around on wings", Birmingham prison was "failing in its responsibility to protect the public by preparing prisoners adequately for release, including hundreds of sex offenders" Peter Clarke wants an independent analysis, "as to how HMP Birmingham descended into appalling, chaotic conditions." The Independent Monitoring Board for the prison stated part of the problem was that the prison reopened too soon after the December 2016 riot. This was because of, "commercial pressures" and increasing numbers of prisoners. Chair, Roger Swindells said, "Re-opening without CCTV on those wings, and with various services not fully functioning and with limited access to education facilities did not assist in provision of a safe stable environment for the men in the prison."

Paul Newton, previously governor at Swaleside Prison will be the new governor, there will be 30 more staff, also the prison population will drop from 1,200 to 900. The Independent Monitoring Board wrote in May 2018, "put simply, the prison fails to provide a safe and decent environment on an almost daily basis". Notable concerns included violence, large scale prohibited drugs, also "regularly overcrowded and unfit living conditions", The board noted further, "toilets in cells with no screen, a generally dirty, poor environment, litter, objects in stairwells, broken windows, heating broken or excessive, broken showers, lack of kettles and even, on occasion, lack of kit and bedding and cockroaches ever present". Frances Crook of the Howard League for Penal Reform, was pleased about the news but feared prisoners would probably "be shipped out in the middle of the night" causing "even more overcrowding in other prisons".

== In popular culture ==
- The prison was featured in an episode of EastEnders in 2000 which shows the character Nick Cotton being released from the prison.
- The prison is mentioned in the book The Third World War: The Untold Story in which it and the city of Birmingham are destroyed by a Soviet nuclear warhead.
- The prison is featured in the 2009 grime film 1 Day.

== Notable inmates ==
Notable former inmates:

- Dorothea Nancy Waddingham (1899 – 16 April 1936) was an English nursing home matron who was convicted of murder.
- Konon Molody, aka Gordon Lonsdale, Soviet spy, subsequently involved in a spy swap
- Charlie Wilson, imprisoned for his part in the Great Train Robbery, he escaped the prison on 12 August 1964. He was recaptured on 24 January 1968 in Canada.
- Ozzy Osbourne (1948-2025), later frontman of the heavy metal band Black Sabbath, served six weeks after he was arrested for breaking and entering and theft in 1966.
- Fred West, serial killer who arrived on remand in May 1994. He committed suicide in his cell on 1 January 1995, before he could be brought to trial.
- Lee Hughes, former West Bromwich Albion striker, spent the early part of his six-year jail term for dangerous driving at the prison in 2004.
- Michael Collins, Irish revolutionary spent a short term at this prison after the Easter rising in 1916.
- Ashley Blake, television presenter
- The Birmingham Six
- Olive Wharry, Edith Marian Begbie, Bertha Ryland, Florence Macfarlane, Constance Bryer and Hilda Burkitt, suffragettes who were force-fed in prison.
- Troy Deeney, Birmingham City F.C. striker, of Watford F.C. at the time. He was convicted of affray in 2012 and was subsequently sentenced to ten months.

Notable current inmates:

- Matthew Falder, serial sex offender and blackmailer.
- James Hurst, former Premier League footballer who was jailed in August 2024 for stalking, harassment, sending false communications and breaching a non-molestation order.
- Lawrence Jones, convicted of rape and sexual assault in 2023 and jailed for 15 years.

== See also ==
- Controversies surrounding G4S
