= 2007 Nobel Prize in Literature =

- Doris Lessing
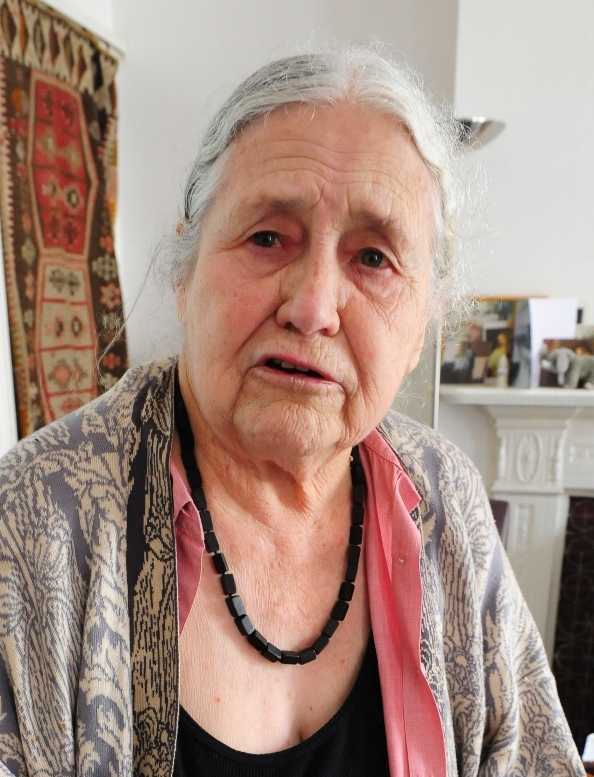
- "that epicist of the female experience, who with scepticism, fire and visionary power has subjected a divided civilisation to scrutiny."
- Date: 11 October 2007 (announcement); 10 December 2007 (ceremony)
- Location: Stockholm, Sweden
- Presented by: Swedish Academy
- First award: 1901
- Website: Official website

The 2007 Nobel Prize in Literature was awarded to the British novelist Doris Lessing (1919–2013) as "that epicist of the female experience, who with scepticism, fire and visionary power has subjected a divided civilisation to scrutiny." Lessing was the oldest person ever, at age 88, to receive the Nobel Prize in Literature followed by the German historian Theodor Mommsen, who received the prize at age 85. She is also the third-oldest Nobel laureate in any category (after Leonid Hurwicz and Raymond Davis Jr.). She became the 11th woman to be awarded the prize.

== Laureate ==
Doris Lessing's body of work comprises around 50 books and spans several genres including The Grass Is Singing (1950), The Memoirs of a Survivor (1974), and The Sweetest Dream (2001). Her writing is characterized by penetrating studies of living conditions in the 20th century, behavioral patterns, and historical developments. Her most experimental novel, The Golden Notebook (1962) is a study of a woman's psyche and life situation, the lot of writers, sexuality, political ideas, and everyday life. Some of Lessing's books reach into the future and, among other things, she portrays our civilization's final hour from the perspective of an extraterrestrial observer such as the Canopus in Argos Series (1979–83). She has also written autobiographical accounts of her life and numerous memoirs like Under My Skin: Volume One of My Autobiography, to 1949 (1994) and Alfred and Emily (2008).

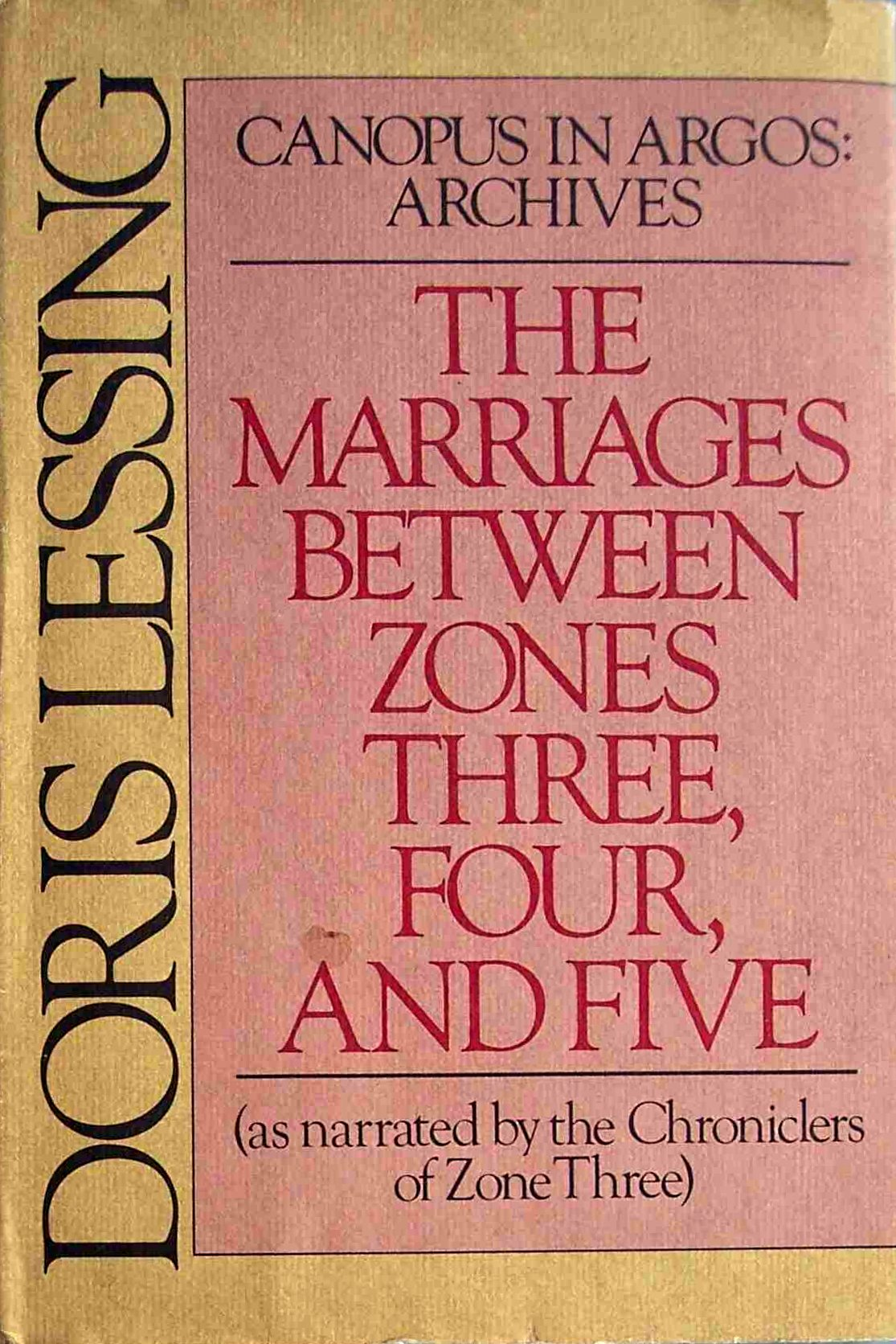
The Marriages Between Zones Three, Four and Five, the second book in Lessing's five-book Canopus in Argos series.

== Deliberations ==
Lessing had been considered by the Nobel committee for many years. In 1974 she was shortlisted for a shared prize with Nadine Gordimer (awarded in 1991). Lessing had that year been proposed by Nobel committee member Artur Lundkvist. In a report about the final candidates for the 1974 prize, Nobel committee chairman Karl Ragnar Gierow found that Gordimer/Lessing was a strong proposal and that they "represent in modern literature not just geographically but also concerning social conditions and experiences a new world of emerging problems, by both brought to life by great artistic power. But they have a future ahead of them". In 1975, Lessing was again on the Nobel committee's shortlist as one of the final candidates for that year's prize.

== Pre-announcement speculations ==
Favourites speculated about to be awarded the 2007 Nobel Prize in Literature included Korean poet Ko Un, Syrian poet Adonis, American novelists Don DeLillo and Cormac McCarthy, Canadian Margaret Atwood, Israeli Amos Oz, Mexican Carlos Fuentes, Peruvian Mario Vargas Llosa (awarded in 2010), Somali Nuruddin Farah and Swedish poet Tomas Tranströmer (awarded in 2011).

== Reactions ==
Lessing was out shopping for groceries when the Nobel Prize announcement came. Arriving home to a gathering of reporters, she exclaimed, "Oh Christ!" "I've won all the prizes in Europe, every bloody one, so I'm delighted to win them all. It's a royal flush."

Her longtime agent, Jonathan Clowes, was delighted at the news of the award he said, "was very well-deserved". Speaking to Reuters, her editor at Fourth Estate, Nicholas Pearson, called it "thrilling" and claimed that her early books "changed the face of literature through the description of the inner lives of women". Jane Friedman, chief executive of HarperCollins (of which Fourth Estate is a division), described her as "an icon for women". American literary critic Harold Bloom provided a negative reaction, describing the choice of Lessing as "pure political correctness", and her later works as "unreadable fourth-rate science fiction".

Lessing called winning the Nobel Prize "a disaster" for her writing, but her friends say the money which came with the prize helped ease her final years, spent, by her own account, giving interviews and caring for her invalid son.

== Nobel lecture ==
She entitled her Nobel Lecture On Not Winning the Nobel Prize and used it to draw attention to global inequality of opportunity and to suggest that fiction writers can be involved in redressing those inequalities. Lessing wrote that "it is our imaginations which shape us, keep us, create us – for good and for ill. It is our stories that will recreate us, when we are torn, hurt, even destroyed." The lecture was later published in a limited edition to raise money for children made vulnerable by HIV/AIDS. In a 2008 interview for the BBC's Front Row she stated that increased media interest after the award had left her without time or energy for writing. Her final book, Alfred and Emily, appeared in 2008.

In 2017, just 10 years later, her Nobel medal was put up for auction. Previously only one Nobel medal for literature had been sold at auction, for André Gide in 2016.
