= Irakli Lomouri =

Georgian writer, translator and playwright

- Born: April 12, 1959 (age 67); Tbilisi, Georgia
- Occupations: Novelist, short story writer, screenwriter, playwright, translator
- Writing career
- Genres: drama, tragicomedy, comedy
- Notable works: An Incident (1982); Auto-Obituary (2012)
- Literary movement: Postmodernism, Metamodernism
- Website: armuri.4forum.biz/t560-topic#11425

Irakli Lomouri (IPA: [iɾakʼli lomouɾi]; Georgian: ირაკლი ლომოური; born 12 April 1959) is a Georgian writer, translator and playwright.

== Biography ==
Lomouri born in 1959, Tbilisi, Georgia. In 1981 he graduated Tbilisi State University, faculty of Oriental studies; later he entered Tbilisi Theological Academy, majoring in Christian Anthropology. Afterwards, he worked as a teacher at various schools and as a journalist in various newspapers, published several Georgian stories, novels and plays. His plays were performed in Georgia at theaters, on television and on radio. Some of his works have been translated into English and Russian. His main works are An Incident and Auto-Obituary.

== Books ==
- Gza (გზა), Ushba Publications Tbilisi, 2020
- Journey to Olympia, Olympic Committee Publishing, 2014
- What the Three World Religions Preach, Ustari Publishing House, 2013
- An Open Letter to Bidzina Ivanishvili or Rather to His Secretary, Intelekti Publishing, 2013
- The Woman from Paris, Intelekti Publishing, 2013
- Mamlakuda and Other Tales, Saunje Publishing House, 2013
- Auto-Obituary, Ustari Publishing House, 2012
- The Chronicles of Parallel Georgia, Gumbati Publishing, 2011
- 33 Rhyme Puzzles for Fun, Palitra L Publishing, 2009
- The Tiflis Stamp or Murder in the Family, Palitra L Publishing, 2008
- Murder in the Sexology Centre, Palitra L Publishing, 2007
- Belles-lettres Cactus, Parnasi Publishing, 2005
- Ex Libris, Publishing House Merani-Lomisi, 2003
- An Incident, Publishing House Lomisi, 1999

== Translations ==
- Short stories by O. Henry, Tbilisi, Palitra L Publishing, ISBN 978-99940-42-52-4
- The Godfather by Mario Puzo, Tbilisi, Palitra L Publishing, ISBN 978-999-40-24-03-2
- The Golden Notebook by Doris Lessing, Tbilisi, Palitra L Publishing, ISBN 978-9941-19-622-5

== Literary prizes and awards ==
- Winner of Literary Contest Lit Harvest 2012 for short story Jo(r)jo
- Winner of National Radio Broadcasting contest 1988 for radio play In the Draw-Well
