= Argyle Street, Norwich =

Street in Norwich, formerly squatted

Argyle Street
- Argyle Street Alternative Republic
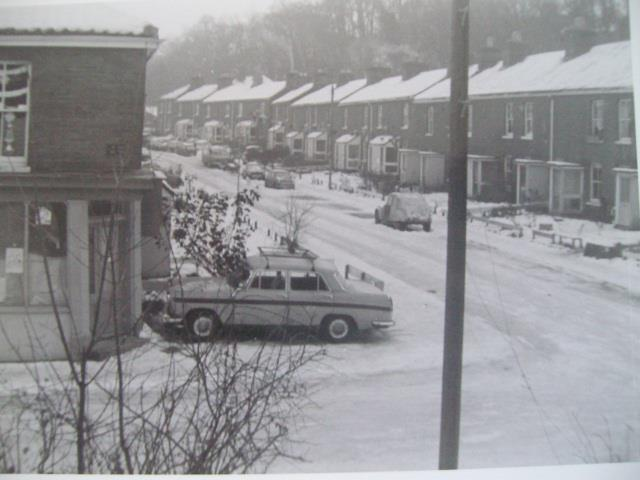
- Argyle Street in winter 1981

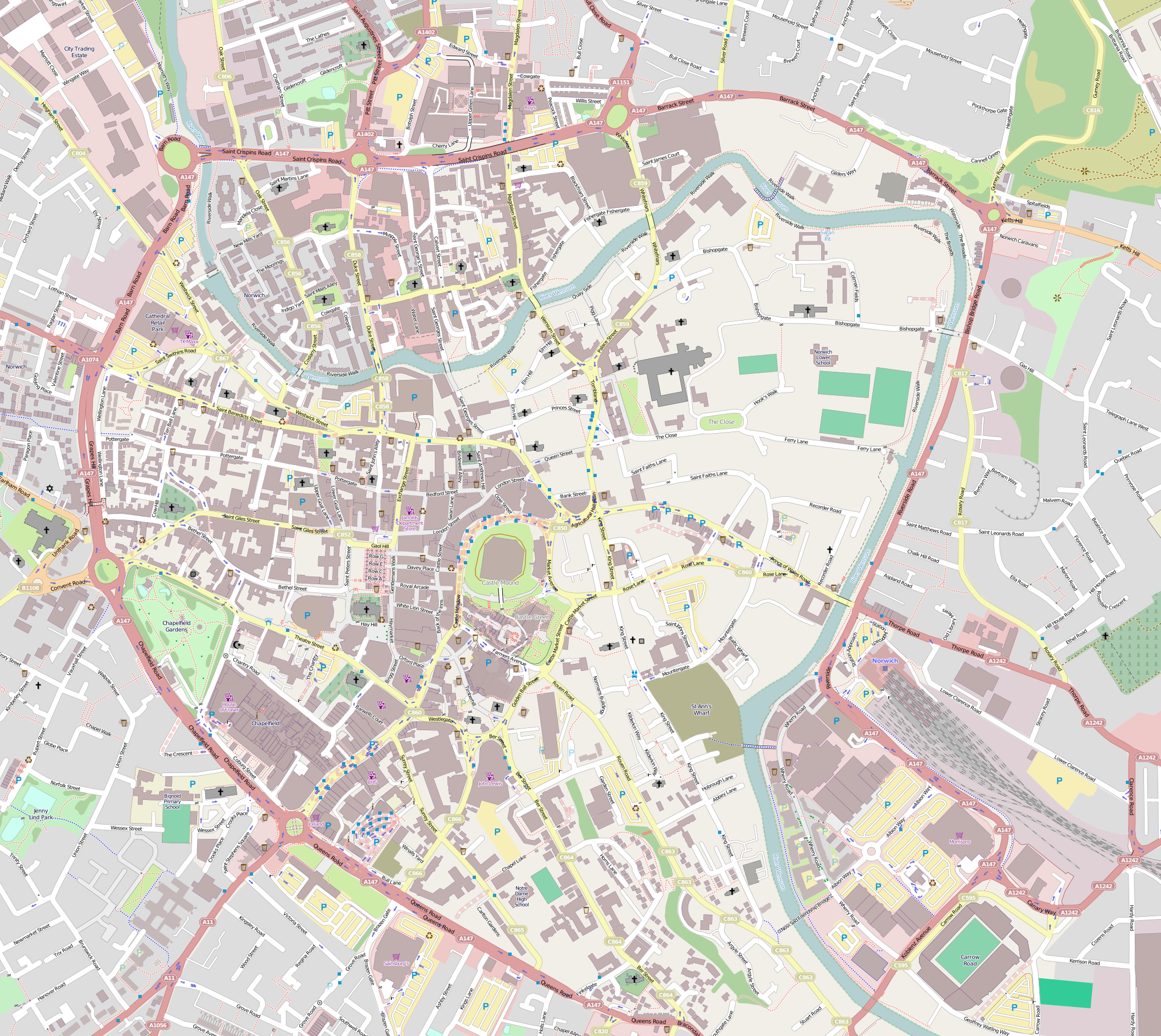
- Location within Norwich
- Maintained by: Norwich City Council
- Coordinates: 52°37′18.9″N 1°18′10.7″E

Construction
- Completion: 1873
- Demolished: 1986

Other
- Known for: Squats in the 1980s

Argyle Street was a Victorian terraced street in Norwich, Norfolk. It became a squat lasting from 1979 to 1985. The street was then demolished in 1986. Some of the newbuild houses were subsequently demolished in 2015.

== History ==
Argyle Street was a Victorian street consisting of small two-up two-down terraced houses. According to Morant's map, it was partly built in 1873. In 1883-4 there were 106 families, primarily manual workers with a significant number of men employed by the railway. The Jarrold & Sons Directory of 1889 lists one shopkeeper.

The street was saved from slum clearance in the early 1960s, after the nearby area of Richmond, or the "village on the hill", was completely demolished.

== Squatted ==
The University of East Anglia planned to buy the Victorian terraced housing of Argyle Street from Norwich City Council for student homes in 1979. However, on 6 December 1978, forty squatters moved into fourteen empty houses and one of Britain's largest and longest running squats had begun. The other fifteen empty houses were quickly occupied and eventually the street had 120 squatters.

The squatters termed the squat the "Argyle Street Alternative Republic". The lamp posts were painted to look like giraffes and the pavements were embellished with rainbows and peace signs.

In 1980 the squatters formed a co-operative which was backed by Norwich City Council, which at the time included Pat Hollis. Together they applied for a grant from the Government-funded Housing Corporation. In 1981 a £1 million grant was agreed for a major renovation scheme, but in 1982 the Department of the Environment blocked Norwich City Council's plan to sell or lease the houses to the co-operative.

== Redevelopment ==
In 1984 Norwich City Council decided to demolish the street and redevelop the area for sheltered homes. The final eviction of squatters from Argyle Street occurred in February 1985.

Some of the redeveloped houses, built in 1986, were judged to be at risk of subsidence in 2009. The tenants were evacuated and the buildings were finally demolished in 2015 after standing empty for six years and becoming an eyesore. The only option left to the council was to demolish the homes for £230,000 and turn the area into a park.

== Film ==
In 1981, Argyle Street became the setting for scenes of a filmed adaptation of Doris Lessing's dystopian novel Memoirs of a Survivor.

In 1985, Al Stokes made a film about the eviction of the squatters, called Street of Experience. Stokes and his crew filmed the leaving party on the night of 19 February and the eviction the following day.
