= A Ripple from the Storm =

1958 novel by Doris Lessing

- Author: Doris Lessing
- Cover artist: William Belcher
- Language: English
- Series: Children of Violence
- Genre: Novel
- Published: 1958
- Publisher: Michael Joseph
- Publication place: United Kingdom
- Media type: Print
- ISBN: 0060976640
- Preceded by: A Proper Marriage
- Followed by: Landlocked

A Ripple from the Storm (1958) is the third novel in British Nobel Prize in Literature-winner Doris Lessing five volume, semi-autobiographical, series, Children of Violence. The first volume is Martha Quest (1952), and the others are, A Proper Marriage (1954), Landlocked (1965), and The Four-Gated City (1969). The Children of Violence series, follows the life of protagonist Martha Quest "from girlhood to middle age".

A Ripple in the Storm describes the growth of a Communist group in a small town in Central Africa, "as a result of the general mood of optimism, enthusiasm and admiration for the Soviet Union current in the years 1942, 1943 and 1944." Martha Quest, now divorced from her husband, joins the communists and marries its leader, who is a German refugee.

There are obvious parallels with Doris Lessing's own life, because after she divorced her first husband, she joined the Left Book Club in 1943. It was here that she met her future second husband, Gottfried Lessing, a refugee from Germany.

== Reception ==
Paul Schlueter of The Buffalo News opined that Lessing is "capable of the intricate and methodical care demanded of such a form" and called the series as a whole a "monumental accomplishment." John Wain of The Observer called it a "very good book" and "battleship-grey". Virgilia Peterson-Sapieha of the Chicago Tribune wrote that Lessing "appears to lack" the "negative, but invaluable instinct of knowing what to leave out and when to stop."
