= Southern Rhodesia Communist Party =

Underground communist party in Rhodesia

- Founded: 1941
- Ideology: Communism

The Southern Rhodesia Communist Party was an illegal, underground communist party established in Southern Rhodesia (present-day Zimbabwe) which was formed in large part due to the minority settler rule, which had an immensely repressive structure. It emerged in 1941 from a split in the Rhodesia Labour Party. The party consisted of a small, and predominantly white, membership. During the parties existence it had links to other communist parties such as the Communist Party of South Africa and the Communist Party of Great Britain. The party disappeared in the late 1940s, with the exact date of its dissolution not being known. Nobel Laureate Doris Lessing author of various works including “The Grass is Singing,” is the most well known member of the Southern Rhodesian Communist Party.

== Overview ==
Southern Rhodesia was a British colony established under minority settler rule; this repressive structure continued to expand throughout the colonies existence. In the 20th century, much of Rhodesia's GDP was made up of extractive methods such as agriculture and mining. However, these sectors were developed on an uneven, unequal, and racist platform. These themes of inequality and racism only continued to grow over the 20th century. In the early 1900s, this led to significant unrest between the Rhodesian working class and the Rhodesian regime and its ruling class. The ruling class faced resistance from the peasantry and the working class. However, the working class and peasantry was not organized or coordinated, so the government quickly crushed any attempts by the workers to strike during this period.

The strikes lacked success because they did not receive large amounts of support from the white working class citizens. Most of these workers came from South Africa and Britain and were familiar with proletarian organizations and struggles, so they were resistant to labor strikes or uprisings. However, In 1916, railway workers formed the Rhodesia Railway Workers' Union. The Rhodesia Mine and General Workers' Association was formed in 1919, both of which led to some spectacularly successful strikes in the early 1920s and allowed for the creation of the Rhodesian Labour Party. The earlier success of the Rhodesian Labour Party led to the creation of the Southern Rhodesian Communist Party, which was created from a split in the Rhodesian Labour Party.

However, because of this there was a possibility of developing an independent movement through the Southern Rhodesia Communist Party, which was gaining traction and popularity in the early 1940s; the party had been formed from the radical elements in the Rhodesian Labour Party, and those who had been associated with the South African Communist Party as well as the Communist Party of Great Britain. Many intellectuals, including prominent author Doris Lessing, also supported it; however, at this time, Russia was pushing for the "Popular Front" unity of all classes, which in Rhodesia meant unity with the white liberals. The price the Southern Rhodesian Communist Party had to pay for this unity was by stopping the work it had been doing with the increasingly emerging black working class, as this was deemed antagonistic towards the increasingly racist white Rhodesian labor force. This decision ultimately proved detrimental to the party, as the black workers and supporters formed a significant population of its working-class base and support.

== Movements ==
In its short-lived existence, the Southern Rhodesian Communist Party and its leaders provided a platform for the black and white working class, which played a part in forming a mass meeting attended by approximately 40,000 people in Bulawayo on April 13, 1948. However, the meeting triggered a strike, which was not the intention of the black and white middle-class workers and party leaders that had organized the event. The strike erupted the following day and was marked by intense militancy as tens of thousands of workers protested at the poor wages and demanded a national living wage as well as better living conditions. The strike was able to gain momentum and spread across the state; it was able to gain support from farmworkers, domestic workers, the unemployed, and even some housewives.

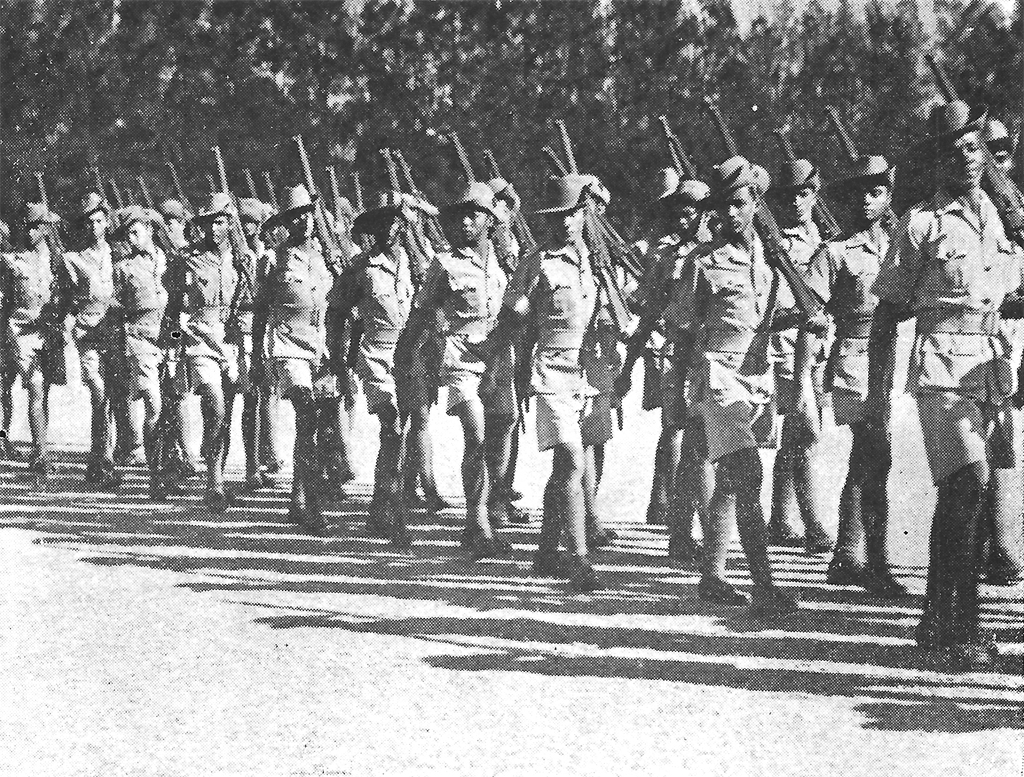
Troops Sent to End Strike. Bulawayo, 1948

The colonial state was able to suppress the strike only by the use of unprecedented force, including that of soldiers. Nevertheless, the government was forced to grant significant concessions to the strikers, including a national minimum wage and recognition of trade unions, which was a win for many supporters and members of the Southern Rhodesian Communist Party. While the organizers of the event did not plan or anticipate the uprising, it was able to enact the change that members of the Southern Rhodesian Communist Party had advocated for throughout the party's existence.

Four years after the Bulawayo strike of 1948, the movement was described by a Zimbabwean writer and anthropologist named Lawrence Vambe as "The first strike which truly threatened the white man."

== Notable figures ==
=== Doris Lessing ===
Doris Lessing was known for her commitment to socialism, which began in the British colony of Southern Rhodesia. Doris Lessing moved from England to Southern Rhodesia with her family at the age of 5. Like many of the Southern Rhodesian Communist party members, she was unhappy about the political situation in Southern Rhodesia, particularly the ingrained racism of the white ruling class.

At twenty-three years old, Doris Lessing joined the Southern Rhodesian Communist party, where she found other like-minded people who felt a similar sentiment to her about Rhodesia and its white ruling class. While in the Southern Rhodesian Communist party, she met and married Gottfried Lessing, another prominent member of the party. During her time in the Communist party, she wrote her first book titled: “The Grass is Singing,” which takes place in Southern Rhodesia, and it addresses the racial politics between blacks and whites in Southern Rhodesia. The book achieved great success in Europe as well as the United States.

However, after the dissolution of the Southern Rhodesian Communist Party, she left Rhodesia and returned home to England. Where she became a member of the Communist Party of Great Britain. She is most well known for winning the Nobel prize for literature for her work in 2007.

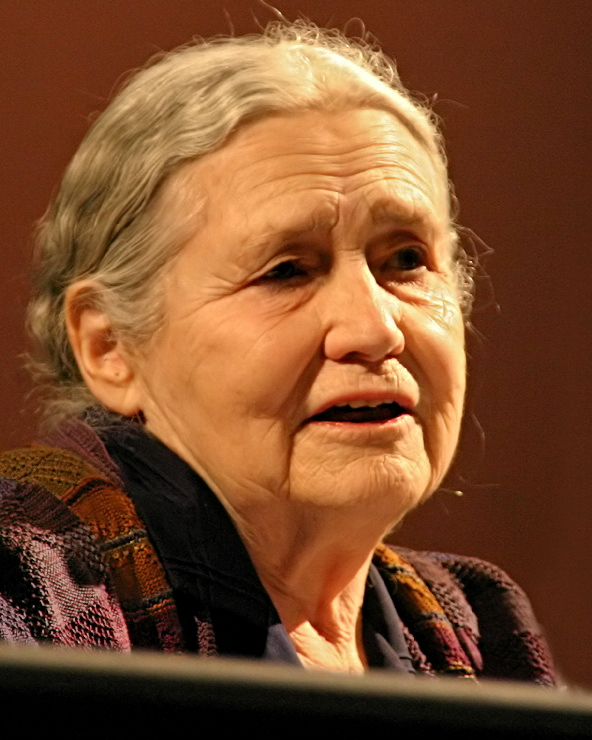
Doris Lessing

=== Gottfried Lessing ===
Gottfried Lessing was another well-known intellectual and member of the Southern Rhodesian Communist Party. He was born in Petrograd, Russia, in 1914. He moved to Rhodesia, where he was a Lawyer in Salisbury (Harare) from 1941 to 1946. It was there that he became a founding member of the Southern Rhodesian Communist Party and one of its leading members. It was during his time in the Southern Rhodesian Communist Party that he met and married Doris Lessing, and the couple had a son. After the dissolution of the Southern Rhodesian Communist Party, Gottfried returned to Great Britain, where he joined the Communist Party of Great Britain.

== Relationships with other communist parties ==
=== Communist Party of Great Britain ===
The Southern Rhodesian Communist Party had links to the Communist Party of Great Britain (CPGB). The CPGB saw Rhodesia as an arena of the same battle against capitalism and imperialism in Southern Africa. Furthermore, the CPGB viewed Rhodesia as the “weakest link” in the chain of the imperialist system and an essential battle against racial oppression in the fight against apartheid. Because of this, The Southern Rhodesian Communist Party drew on support from the CPGB to achieve the group’s mutual goals. The Communist Party had long been involved in anti-colonial and anti-imperialist politics in Africa, which aligned with the Southern Rhodesian Communist party, and the CPGBs publicity material proudly stated:

“ The Communist Party is the only political party that has always opposed imperialism and all forms of colonial rule and exploitation. It fully supports the efforts of the colonial and newly independent peoples.”

“We have stood consistently by the peoples of Africa and Asia and never hesitated in that cause to oppose our government and condemn the actions of our military forces.”

=== South African Communist Party ===
During the Southern Rhodesian Communist Party's existence, the group also had links to the South African Communist Party. However, that was short-lived. When the Southern Rhodesian Communist Party tried to strengthen its links with its fellow communist counterparts in South Africa, the South Africans questioned the basis for a communist party in Rhodesia and said that "black masses [in Zimbabwe] have no political consciousness." Because of this, the two groups links were short-lived and never very strong.

== Dissolution ==
A significant reason for the party's short-lived existence was that it was underground and was not officially recognized by the colonial government, making it hard to draw in support and awareness. Also, at the time of the Rhodesian Communist Party, the USSR was pushing for the "Popular Front" unity of all classes, which in Rhodesia meant unity with the white liberals, which did not include black people in Rhodesia, which was a significant source of support for the movement. As a result, the Southern Rhodesian Communist Party had to pay for the unity of the "popular front" by stopping the work it had been doing with the black working class. This proved detrimental to the movement as the black supporters formed a significant population of its working-class base and supporters. In addition, another primary reason that the Southern Rhodesia Communist Party was never able to achieve the same level of success as other Communist Parties was because the farmers and laborers of Rhodesia were never nearly as impoverished as the ones in other countries such as South Africa.

Furthermore, because the party lacked outside support from organizations other than the Communist Party of Great Britain, it could not increase its popularity or prominence, which was a significant reason for the movement's short-lived existence. Ultimately this proved to be too much to overcome. By the turn of the decade, the party had dissolved, with many of its key members leaving Southern Rhodesia to return home to Europe or South Africa.
