= Memoirs of a Survivor (film) =

1981 film

- DVD cover
- Directed by: David Gladwell
- Written by: David Gladwell; Kerry Crabbe; Doris Lessing
- Based on: The Memoirs of a Survivor by Doris Lessing
- Produced by: Penny Clark; Michael Medwin
- Starring: Julie Christie
- Cinematography: Walter Lassally
- Edited by: Bill Shapter
- Production company: Memorial Films
- Distributed by: Columbia-Warner Distributors
- Release date: September 1981
- Running time: 115 minutes
- Country: United Kingdom
- Language: English
- Budget: £800,000

Memoirs of a Survivor is a 1981 British science fiction film directed by David Gladwell, with some scenes filmed at the location of Argyle Street, Norwich. It was screened in the Un Certain Regard section at the 1981 Cannes Film Festival. It is based on the 1974 novel of the same name by Doris Lessing.

== Plot ==
After a near-future economic collapse, England lies in ruins. Middle aged D (Julie Christie) struggles to survive in the failing city, where electricity is infrequent, water delivery scarce and trash pick up non-existent. As she rarely leaves her apartment, D is required to take in teenager Emily, allowing her to share D's apartment, in exchange for the girl's help.

Emily soon begins to fall for Gerald (Christopher Guard) and leaves D to move in with Gerald. Gerald operates a makeshift refugee camp for the orphan and homeless children of the city. D is able to see Gerald's failing whereas Emily cannot.

In addition. D's grasp on reality is questioned as she can also travel back in time and observe a Victorian age family that resided in the same apartment. D may be witnessing the distorted history of the young woman currently in her care, as the child in the Victorian age is also named Emily, although whether these trips to the past are actually occurring or they are a fantasy in D's mind is a question left unanswered.

== Cast ==
- Julie Christie as D
- Christopher Guard as Gerald
- Leonie Mellinger as Emily Mary Cartwright
- Debbie Hutchings as June
- Nigel Hawthorne as Victorian Father
- Pat Keen as Victorian Mother
- Georgina Griffiths as Victorian Emily
- Christopher Tsangarides as Victorian Son
- Mark Dignam as Newsvendor
- Alison Dowling as Janet White
- John Franklyn-Robbins as Prof. White
- Rowena Cooper as Mrs. White
- Barbara Hicks as Woman on Waste Ground
- John Comer as Man Delivering Emily
- Adrienne Byrne as Maureen

== Production ==
Part of the budget came from the National Film Finance Corporation (NFFC). It was part of a slate of films from them that including Babylon, Gregory's Girl and An Unsuitable Job for a Woman. Mamoun Hassan of the NFFC said he was prompted to invest because the film dealt with the possibility of a nuclear apocalypse. "I felt this was a subject we had to film: not survival as some kind of adventure story, but a film which would link up with the anxieties so many people have, both spoken and unspoken."

Houssan said "It is very difficult for any of us to look into the abyss directly, and this was, as it were, a reflected view of the abyss. It was a kind of mirror, so that we could look into the abyss without being turned to stone." He called Doris Lessing "a major writer... the Hermann Hesse of today" and the script "marvellous" and felt Gladwell as "the director to do it: a man who had already dealt with an extraordinary theme, people emerging from their graves."

Director David Gladwell originally wanted Ingrid Bergman to play the lead but she was too old. Then he approached Jeanne Moreau, as she was close in age to the character in the novel, and she agreed to make it but he was unable to raise finance with her attached. The NFFC suggested Julie Christie. Christie agreed to make the film for less than her usual salary after being impressed by Gladwell's Requiem for a Village.

Even with Christie attached raised finance proved difficult. Houssan said "there were half a dozen co-investors, each of whom fell out at various times, but eventually EMI came in. And that in itself was remarkable, because EMI had not invested in that kind of picture for a very long time." At the time EMI Films was under Barry Spikings. The movie was part of a slate of $70 million from EMI which also included Honky Tonk Freeway, Comrades and The Knight (the last two would not be made).

Filming took place over nine weeks in London and Norfolk. Houssan said the film cost "somewhere between half a million and a million" and was "probably the most risky we have backed to date" and "did suffer from limitations of finance. It suffered in terms of the schedule." Houssan said he knew the film was a risk:

There were mysteries in the film, opaque passages, and we were not naive enough to think that it would be easy. It is not allowed for a director who works in our culture to set up questions to which there are no immediate answers. Or no answers at all. And although film buffs are likely to forgive Tarkovsky, when he fails to enable them to understand him, they will not forgive a British director. There is no tradition here of that kind of film where the journey itself is more exciting than talking about the destination. We knew all those problems, but I still feel it was essential that we should be prepared to take that kind of risk. Whether we are going to succeed, in the sense of getting large enough audiences in Britain, I have no idea.

== Reception ==
The film was a financial disappointment.

Variety praised the performance of Christie, but stated that the low budget hampered the portrayal of the degenerating city.

The Evening Standard called it a "dense and sometimes enigmatic film."

Christie won a Fantasporto International Fantasy Film Award for Best Actress for her performance.

The website Experiential Conversations states that the movie "takes an impressionistic approach" to the material of the novel, while mentioning that Christie is able to carry this curious and haunting film; however, they state that the viewer must abandon trying to comprehend the literal meaning of the Victorian sequences, and instead accept the film on the whole as an immensely atmospheric mood piece. Moria Reviews states that the film is "what one might kindly call a flawed film", although it also praised the visuals of the film, as well as the ending and a brooding scene.

== Notes ==
- Houston, Penelope (Autumn 1981). "A Minor Major". Sight and Sound. Vol. 50, no. 4. p. 244-253.
- Taylor, Jenny (1982). "Memoirs was made of this: an interview with David Gladwell, director of Memoirs of a Survivor". Notebooks, memoirs, archives : reading and rereading Doris Lessing. Routledge & Kegan Paul. p. 227-240.
