= A Proper Marriage =

1954 novel by Doris Lessing

- First edition
- Author: Doris Lessing
- Cover artist: Peter Rudland
- Language: English
- Series: Children of Violence
- Published: 1954
- Publisher: Michael Joseph
- Publication place: United Kingdom
- Media type: Print
- Pages: 448
- ISBN: 0246109416
- Preceded by: Martha Quest
- Followed by: A Ripple from the Storm

A Proper Marriage (1954) is the second novel in British writer Doris Lessing's five volume, semi-autobiographical, series, Children of Violence. The first volume is Martha Quest (1952), and the others are A Ripple from the Storm (1958), Landlocked (1965), and The Four-Gated City (1969). The Children of Violence series, follows the life of protagonist Martha Quest "from girlhood to middle age". A Proper Marriage has been considered a bildungsroman.

A Proper Marriage continues the story of Lessing's eponymous protagonist that she began in Martha Quest. In that novel Martha, aged fifteen left the Southern Rhodesian farm on which she was brought up to work as a typist in the provincial capital, 'the big city'. "Although rapidly disillusioned, she was inescapable drawn into the hectic life of the smart set" and then gets married. A Proper Marriage reveals the way in which "Martha's rebellious temperament reacted to her new life", and of "her growing discontent with the young married set to which she and her husband Douglas now belong; of the arrival of her baby, which seems another threat to her freedom". The novel also deals with the outbreak of World War II "and of her husband's "departure with the army".
