= The Good Terrorist =

1985 political novel by Doris Lessing

- Cover of first UK edition
- Author: Doris Lessing
- Language: English
- Genre: Political novel
- Publisher: Jonathan Cape (UK); Knopf (US)
- Publication date: September 1985
- Publication place: United Kingdom
- Media type: Print
- Pages: 370
- Awards: WH Smith Literary Award; Mondello Prize
- ISBN: 0-224-02323-3
- OCLC: 466286852

The Good Terrorist is a 1985 political novel written by the British novelist Doris Lessing. The book's protagonist is the naïve drifter Alice, who squats with a group of radicals in London and is drawn into their terrorist activities.

Lessing was spurred to write The Good Terrorist by the Irish Republican Army (IRA) bombing of the Harrods department store in London in 1983. She had been a member of the British Communist Party, but left after the 1956 Hungarian uprising. Some reviewers labelled the novel a satire, while Lessing called it humorous. The title is an oxymoron which highlights Alice's ambivalent nature.

The Good Terrorist divided reviewers. Some praised its insight and characterisation, while others faulted its style and the characters' lack of depth. One critic complimented Lessing's "strong descriptive prose and her precise and realistic characterisations", another her "brilliant account of the types of individuals who commit terrorist acts", yet another called it "surprisingly bland", and the characters "trivial or two-dimensional or crippled by self-delusions". The Good Terrorist was shortlisted for the Booker Prize, and won the Mondello Prize and the WH Smith Literary Award.

== Plot summary ==
The Good Terrorist is written in the subjective third person from the point of view of Alice, an unemployed politics and economics graduate in her mid-thirties who drifts from commune to commune. She is trailed by Jasper, a graduate she took in at a student commune she lived in fifteen years previously, who sponges off her. Alice fell in love with him, only to become frustrated by his aloofness and burgeoning homosexuality. She considers herself a revolutionary, fighting against "fascist imperialism", but is still dependent on her parents, whom she treats with contempt. In the early 1980s, Alice joins a squat of like-minded "comrades" in a derelict house in London. Other members of the squat include Bert, its ineffective leader, and a lesbian couple, the maternal Roberta and her unstable and fragile partner Faye.

The abandoned house is in a state of disrepair and earmarked by the City Council for demolition. In the face of the indifference of her comrades, Alice takes it upon herself to clean up and renovate the house. She also persuades the authorities to restore the electricity and water supplies. Alice becomes the house's "mother", cooking for everyone, and dealing with the local police, who are trying to evict them. The members of the squat belong to the Communist Centre Union (CCU), and attend demonstrations and pickets. Alice involves herself in some of these activities, but spends most of her time working on the house.

To be more useful to the struggle, Jasper and Bert travel to Ireland and the Soviet Union to offer their services to the Irish Republican Army (IRA) and the KGB, but are turned down. A more organised group of revolutionaries moves in next door and start using Alice's house as a conduit for arms, to which Alice objects. Mysterious strangers visit the squat and question their decision making.

The comrades eventually decide to act on their own, calling themselves "Freeborn British Communists". They start experimenting with explosives and build a car bomb. Alice does not fully support this action, but accepts the majority decision. They target an upmarket hotel in Knightsbridge, but their inexperience results in the premature detonation of the bomb, which kills Faye and several passers-by. The remaining comrades, shaken by what they have done, decide to leave the squat and split up. Alice, disillusioned by Jasper, chooses not to follow him and remains behind because she cannot bear to abandon the house into which she has poured so much effort. Despite her initial reservations about the bombing, Alice feels a need to justify their actions to others, but realises it would be fruitless because "[o]rdinary people simply didn't understand". She acknowledges that she is a terrorist now, though she cannot remember when the change happened.

== Background ==
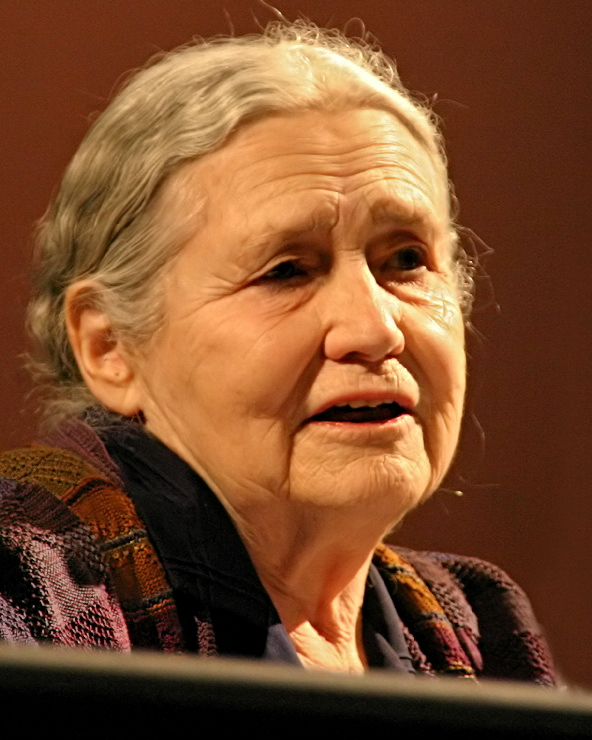
Doris Lessing speaking at a Cologne literature festival in Germany, 2006

Doris Lessing's interest in politics began in the 1940s while she was living in Southern Rhodesia (now Zimbabwe). She was attracted to a group of "quasi-Communist[s]" and joined the chapter of the Left Book Club in Salisbury (now Harare). Later, prompted by the conflicts arising from racial segregation prominent in Rhodesia at the time, she also joined the Southern Rhodesian Labour Party. Lessing moved to London in 1949 and began her writing career there. She became a member of the British Communist Party in the early 1950s, and was an active campaigner against the use of nuclear weapons.

By 1964, Lessing had published six novels, but grew disillusioned with Communism following the 1956 Hungarian uprising and, after reading The Sufis by Idries Shah, turned her attention to Sufism, an Islamic belief system. This prompted her to write her five-volume "space fiction" series, Canopus in Argos: Archives, which drew on Sufi concepts. The series was not well received by some of her readers, who felt she had abandoned her "rational worldview".

The Good Terrorist was Lessing's first book to be published after the Canopus in Argos series, which prompted several retorts from reviewers, including, "Lessing has returned to Earth", and "Lessing returns to reality". Several commentators have labelled The Good Terrorist as a satire, while Lessing called it humorous. She said:

[I]t's not a book with a political statement. It's ... about a certain kind of political person, a kind of self-styled revolutionary that can only be produced by affluent societies. There's a great deal of playacting that I don't think you'd find in extreme left revolutionaries in societies where they have an immediate challenge.

Lessing said she was inspired to write The Good Terrorist by the IRA bombing of the Harrods department store in London in 1983. She recalled, "the media reported it to sound as if it was the work of amateurs. I started to think, what kind of amateurs could they be?" and realised "how easy it would be for a kid, not really knowing what he or she was doing, to drift into a terrorist group." Lessing already had Alice in mind as the central character: "I know several people like Alice—this mixture of ... maternal caring, ... and who can contemplate killing large numbers of people without a moment's bother." She described Alice as "quietly comic[al]" because she is so full of contradictions. She said she was surprised how some of the characters (other than Jasper, Alice's love interest) developed, such as the pill-popping and fragile Faye, who turned out to be a "destroyed person".

== Genre ==
The Good Terrorist has been labelled a "political novel" by the publishers and some reviewers, including Alison Lurie in The New York Review of Books. Lurie stated that as political fiction, it is "one of the best novels ... about the terrorist mentality" since Joseph Conrad's The Secret Agent (1907), although this was questioned by William H. Pritchard in The Hudson Review, who wrote that compared to Conrad, The Good Terrorist is "shapeless". Several commentators have called it more a novel about politics than political fiction. In From the Margins of Empire: Christina Stead, Doris Lessing, Nadine Gordimer, Louise Yelin called the work a novel about politics, rather than a political novel per se.

The Good Terrorist has also been called a satire. In her book Doris Lessing: The Poetics of Change, Gayle Greene called it a "satire of a group of revolutionaries", and Susan Watkins, writing in Doris Lessing: Border Crossings, described it as a "dry and satirical examination of a woman's involvement with a left-wing splinter group". A biography of Lessing for the Swedish Academy on the occasion of her being awarded the 2007 Nobel Prize in Literature called it "a satirical picture of the need of the contemporary left for total control and the female protagonist's misdirected martyrdom and subjugation". Yelin said the novel "oscillat[ed] between satire and nostalgia". Academic Robert E. Kuehn felt that it is not satire at all and that while the book could have been a "satire of the blackest and most hilarious kind", in his opinion Lessing "has no sense of humor, and instead of lashing [the characters] with the satirist's whip, she treats them with unremitting and belittling irony".

Virginia Scott called the novel a fantasy. Drawing on Lewis Carroll's Alice's Adventures in Wonderland in The International Fiction Review, she wrote that "[Lessing's] Alice with her group of political revolutionaries can be seen as a serious fantasy which has striking parallels to ... Carroll's Alice". Both Alices enter a house and are confronted by seemingly impossible challenges: Carroll's Alice has to navigate passages too small to fit through, while Lessing's Alice finds herself in a barely inhabitable house that is earmarked for demolition. Both Alices are able to change their appearances: in Wonderland, Alice adjusts her size to suit her needs; in The Good Terrorist, Alice changes her demeanour to get what she wants from others. Scott noted that at one point in The Good Terrorist, Faye refers to Alice as "Alice the Wonder, the wondrous Alice", alluding to Carroll's Alice.

== Themes ==
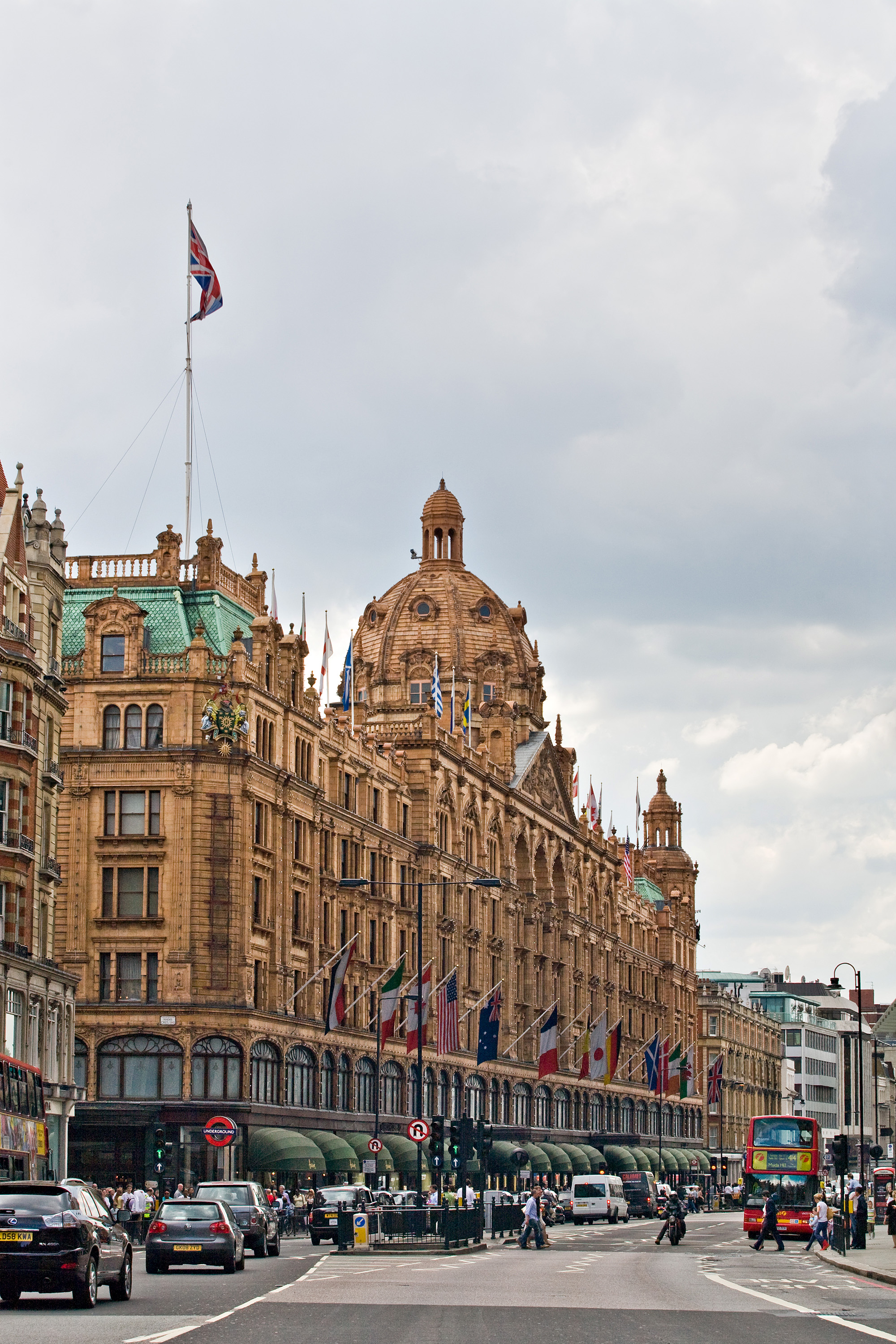
The 1983 IRA bombing of the Harrods department store (shown here in 2009) spurred Lessing to write The Good Terrorist.

The American novelist Judith Freeman wrote that one of the common themes in The Good Terrorist is that of keeping one's identity in a collective, of preserving "individual conscience". This theme suggests that problems occur when we are coerced into conforming. Freeman said that Alice is a "quintessential good woman ... the little Hausefrau [sic] revolutionary", who turns bad under peer pressure.

Another theme present is the symbolic nature of the house. Margaret Scanlan stated that as in books like Mansfield Park and Jane Eyre, The Good Terrorist "defines a woman in terms of her house". Writing in the journal Studies in the Novel, Katherine Fishburn said that Lessing often uses a house to symbolise "psychological or ontological change", and that here, "the house ... symbolizes Alice's function in the story". Yelin described The Good Terrorist as "an urban, dystopian updating of the house-as-England genre, [where] ... England is represented by a house in London".

Several critics have focused on the theme of motherhood. In "Mothers and Daughters/Aging and Dying", Claire Sprague wrote that Lessing often dwells on the theme of mothers passing their behaviours onto their daughters, and how the cycle of daughters fighting their mothers permeates each generation. The British novelist Jane Rogers said that The Good Terrorist "is as unsparing and incisive about motherhood as it is about the extreme left", and that motherhood here "is terrible": Alice's mother is reduced to despair continually yielding to her selfish daughter's demands; Alice mothers Jasper, and has a similar despairing relationship with him. Rogers added that motherhood is depicted here as a compulsion to protect the weak, despite their propensity to retaliate and hurt you.

Feminist themes and the subjugation of women have also been associated with The Good Terrorist. Scanlan indicated that while many of the comrades in the book are women, they find that political activity does not elevate their position, and that they are "trapped in the patriarchy they despise". Yelin suggested that although Lessing ridicules the male members of the CCU and their role playing, she is also critical of the female members "who collude in male-dominant political organizations and thus in their own oppression". But with the book's allusions to Jasper's homosexuality, Yelin added that Lessing's "critique of women's infatuation with patriarchal misogyny and their emotional dependence on misogynist men" is muted by homophobia and the "misogyny pervasive in patriarchal constructions of (male) heterosexuality".

== Critical analysis ==
Several critics have called The Good Terrorist's title an oxymoron. Robert Boschman suggested it is indicative of Alice's "contradictory personality" – she renovates the squat's house, yet is focused on destroying society. In The Hudson Review, George Kearns wrote that the title "hovers above the novel with ... irony". The reader assumes that Alice is the "good terrorist", but that while she may be a good person, she is "rotten at being a terrorist". Writing in World Literature Today, Mona Knapp concluded that Lessing's heroine, the "good terrorist", is neither a good person, nor a good revolutionary. She knows how to renovate houses and manipulate people to her advantage, but she is unemployed and steals money from her parents. When real revolutionaries start using the squat to ship arms, she panics and, going behind her comrades' backs, makes a telephone call to the authorities to warn them. Knapp called Alice "a bad terrorist and a stunted human being". Fishburn suggested that it is Lessing herself who is the "good terrorist", symbolised here by Alice, but that hers is "political terrorism of a literary kind", where she frequently disguises her ideas in "very domestic-looking fiction", and "direct[ly] challenge[s] ... our sense of reality".

Kuehn described Alice as "well-intentioned, canny and sometimes lovable", but as someone who, at 36, never grew up, and is still dependent on her parents. Yelin said Alice is "in a state of perpetual adolescence", and her need to "mother everyone" is "an extreme case of psychological regression or failure to thrive". Greene wrote that Alice's "humanitarianism is ludicrous in her world", and described her as "so furiously at odds with herself" because she is too immature to comprehend what is happening and her actions vary from being helpful to dangerous.

Boschman called Lessing's narrative "ironic" because it highlights the divide between who Alice is and who she thinks she is, and her efforts to pretend there is no discrepancy. Alice refuses to acknowledge that her "maternal activities" stem from her desire to win her mother's approval and, believing that her mother has "betrayed and abandoned" her, turns to Jasper as a way to "continue to sustain her beliefs about herself and the world". Even though Jasper takes advantage of her adoration of him by mistreating her, Alice still clings to him because her self-image "vigorously qualifies her perception of [him], and thus proliferates the denial and self-deception". The fact that Jasper has turned to homosexuality, which Alice dismisses as "his emotional life", "suits her own repressed desires". Kuehn called Alice's obsession with the "hapless" and "repellent" Jasper "just comprehensible", adding that she feels safe with his gayness, even though she has to endure his abuse.

Knapp stated that while Lessing exposes self-styled insurrectionists as "spoiled and immature products of the middle class", she also derides their ineptness at affecting any meaningful change. Lessing is critical of the state which "feeds the very hand that terrorizes it", yet she also condemns those institutions that exploits the working class and ignores the homeless. Knapp remarks that Lessing does not resolve these ambiguities, but instead highlights the failings of the state and those seeking to overthrow it. Scanlan compared Lessing's comrades to Richard E. Rubenstein's terrorists in his book Alchemists of Revolution: Terrorism in the Modern World. Rubenstein wrote that when "ambitious idealists" have no "creative ruling class to follow or a rebellious lower class to lead [they] have often taken upon themselves the burden of representative action", which he said "is a formula for disaster".

== Reception ==
Critical opinion is divided on The Good Terrorist. Elizabeth Lowry highlighted this in the London Review of Books: "[Lessing] has been sharply criticised for the pedestrian quality of her prose, and as vigorously defended". The Irish literary critic Denis Donoghue complained that the style of the novel is "insistently drab", and Kuehn referred to Lessing's text as "surprisingly bland". Lowry noted that the English academic Clare Hanson defended the book by saying that it is "a grey and textureless novel because it ... speaks a grey and textureless language".

Freeman described the book a "graceful and accomplished story", and a "brilliant account of the types of individuals who commit terrorist acts". Writing in the Los Angeles Times, Freeman described Lessing as "one of our most valuable writers" who "has an uncanny grasp of human relationships". In a review in the Sun-Sentinel, Bonnie Gross wrote that it was Lessing's "most accessible" book to date, and that her "strong descriptive prose and her precise and realistic characterizations" made it "remarkable" and "rewarding reading". Gross considered the female characters, particularly Alice, much more developed than the male ones.

Amanda Sebestyen wrote in The Women's Review of Books that at first glance the ideas in The Good Terrorist appear deceptively simple, and the plot predictable. But she added that Lessing's strength is her "stoic narrat[ion] of the daily effort of living", which excels in describing day-to-day life in a squat. Sebestyen also praised the book's depiction of Alice, who "speak[s] to me most disquietingly about myself and my generation". In a review in Off Our Backs, an American feminist publication, Vickie Leonard called The Good Terrorist a "fascinating book" that is "extremely well written" with characters that are "exciting" and "realistic". Leonard added that even though Alice is not a feminist, the book illustrates the author's "strong admiration for women and their accomplishments".

Writing in The Guardian, Rogers described The Good Terrorist as "a novel in unsparing close-up" that examines society through the eyes of individuals. She said it is "witty and ... angry at human stupidity and destructiveness", and within the context of recent terrorist attacks in London, it is an example of "fiction going where factual writing cannot". A critic in Kirkus Reviews wrote that Alice's story is "an extraordinary tour de force—a psychological portrait that's realistic with a vengeance". The reviewer added that although Alice is "self-deluding" and not always likeable, the novel's strength are the characters and its depiction of political motivation.

Donoghue wrote in The New York Times that he did not care much about what happened to Alice and her comrades. He felt that Lessing presents Alice as "an unquestioned rigmarole of reactions and prejudices", which leaves no room for any further interest. Donoghue complained that Lessing has not made up her mind on whether her characters are "the salt of the earth or its scum". In a review in the Chicago Tribune, Kuehn felt that the work has little impact and is not memorable. He said Lessing's real interest is character development, but complained that the characters are "trivial or two-dimensional or crippled by self-delusions".

The Good Terrorist was shortlisted for the 1985 Booker Prize, and in 1986 won the Mondello Prize and the WH Smith Literary Award. In 2007 Lessing was awarded the Nobel Prize in Literature for being "part of both the history of literature and living literature". In the award ceremony speech by Swedish writer Per Wästberg, The Good Terrorist was cited as "an in-depth account of the extreme leftwing squatting culture that sponges off female self-sacrifice". Following Lessing's death in 2013, The Guardian put The Good Terrorist in their list of the top five Lessing books. Indian writer Neel Mukherjee included the novel in his 2015 "top 10 books about revolutionaries", also published in The Guardian.

== Publication history ==
The Good Terrorist was first published in September 1985 in hardcover by Jonathan Cape in the United Kingdom, and by Alfred A. Knopf in the United States. The first paperback edition was published in the United Kingdom in September 1986 by Grafton. An unabridged 13-hour audio cassette edition, narrated by Nadia May, was released in the United States in April 1999 by Blackstone Audio. The novel has been translated into several other languages including Catalan, Chinese, French, German, Italian, Spanish and Swedish.

== Works cited ==
- Boschman, Robert (January 2003). "Excrement and 'Kitsch' in Doris Lessing's 'The Good Terrorist'". In Bloom, Harold (ed.). Doris Lessing. New York City: Infobase Publishing. pp. 87–106. ISBN 978-0-7910-7441-1.
- Fishburn, Katherine (1988). "Wor(l)ds Within Words: Doris Lessing as Meta-fictionist and Meta-physician". Studies in the Novel. 20 (2). University of North Texas: 186–205. JSTOR 29532567.
- Greene, Gayle (1997). Doris Lessing: The Poetics of Change. Ann Arbor, Michigan: University of Michigan Press. ISBN 0-472-08433-X.
- Kearns, George (1986). "Revolutionary Women and Others". The Hudson Review. 39 (1). The Hudson Review, Inc: 121–134. doi:10.2307/3851633. JSTOR 3851633.
- Lessing, Doris (2013) [1985]. The Good Terrorist. London: Fourth Estate. ISBN 978-0-00-749878-9.
- Scanlan, Margaret (1990). "Language and the Politics of Despair in Doris Lessing's The Good Terrorist". Novel: A Forum on Fiction. 23 (2). Duke University Press: 182–198. doi:10.2307/1345737. JSTOR 1345737.
- Yelin, Louise (1998). From the Margins of Empire: Christina Stead, Doris Lessing, Nadine Gordimer. Ithaca, New York: Cornell University Press. ISBN 978-0-8014-8505-3.
