= Briefing for a Descent into Hell =

1971 novel by Doris Lessing

- First edition
- Author: Doris Lessing
- Language: English
- Genre: Psychological novel
- Publisher: Alfred A. Knopf
- Publication date: 1971
- Media type: Print (hardcover and paperback)
- Pages: 308
- ISBN: 0394421981

Briefing for a Descent into Hell is a 1971 psychological novel by British novelist Doris Lessing. It was shortlisted for that the 1971 Booker Prize.

== Plot ==
The novel begins when a well-dressed but dishevelled man is found wandering alone at night on London's Embankment. Unable to remember anything, he is escorted to a psychiatric hospital, where he is identified as Charles Watkins, a professor of Classics at the University of Cambridge. An example of what Lessing called "inner space fiction", the novel contrasts Watkins's fantastical accounts of his own semi-mystical hallucinations – including being adrift on a raft in the Atlantic and flying through outer space – with the doctors' and nurses' increasingly draconian attempts to sedate and "cure" the patient.

== Release ==
Briefing for a Descent into Hell was first published in hardback in the United Kingdom and United States in 1971 through Jonathan Cape and Alfred A. Knopf, respectively.

== Reception ==
In a largely negative review in The New York Times, Joan Didion described the novel's grappling with questions of sanity and insanity as "less than astonishing stuff". She noted parallels between the novel and the writings of Scottish psychiatrist R. D. Laing. Didion included the review in her 1979 essay collection The White Album.
