= Ben, in the World =

Novel by Doris Lessing

- First edition (UK)
- Author: Doris Lessing
- Language: English
- Publisher: Flamingo (UK); HarperCollins (US)
- Publication date: 05 June 2000 (UK)25 July 2000 (US)
- Publication place: United Kingdom
- Media type: Print (hardback & paperback)
- Pages: 192
- ISBN: 0-00-226195-2
- Preceded by: The Fifth Child

Ben, in the World is a novel written by Doris Lessing, published in 2000, in which she stages a parody of the 'objectivity' of the narrator's voice. The story delves into the life of Ben Lovatt following the events of the first book dedicated to this character, The Fifth Child.

== Plot summary ==
Ben, in the World takes place a number of years after the events in The Fifth Child.

In the beginning of Ben, in the World, Ben Lovatt is 18 years old and living with an elderly lady named Mrs. Biggs. However, she cannot afford to support both of them, and sends Ben to his estranged family to ask for his birth certificate so that he can get unemployment benefit. By the time Ben returns (without the birth certificate), Mrs. Biggs has been hospitalised. She returns home but needs to be nursed by Ben, but they cannot survive for long on her pension alone. He leaves to find somewhere else to stay.

He returns to Rita, a sex worker he has seen several times previously, and who was attracted to his primal nature. Johnston, her procurer, does not like Ben, but knows Rita cares for him.

Johnston comes up with a plan to use Ben to smuggle a large amount of narcotics into France, which would give him and Rita enough money to permanently get off the streets. Johnston also sees this as an opportunity to get Ben out of their lives by leaving him in France, a plan that Rita is aware of, and objects to, but ultimately doesn't do anything about. The plan succeeds, and Ben remains in France under the temporary care of Richard, one of Johnston's men, in an expensive hotel, with a cut from the smuggling deal.

Although Richard comes to like Ben, and stays with him a little longer than planned, he ultimately leaves Ben in the hotel with two weeks paid in advance. Ben meets Alex, an American film producer who is drawn to Ben, and decides to make a film about him, with a theme around what he sees as primitive tribes. To save money he decides to set the film in Brazil, as he knows many people there who may fund it. He takes Ben to Rio de Janeiro and introduces Ben to Teresa, an actress who is Alex's girlfriend when he stays in Rio.

Alex goes into the jungle with his co-writer, leaving Teresa and Ben in a flat in Rio. Teresa grows attached to Ben, and introduces him to several friends, including Inez, who is privileged and works in a compound as a scientist. Alex stays longer and longer in the jungle, slowly abandoning his original idea for the movie, along with the inclusion of Ben in the story.

Inez introduces Ben to scientists from the compound at the flat, who see him as a throwback, and want to study him. Initially they have Teresa convince Ben to go for voluntary testing at the compound. When Ben becomes agitated, reminded of the testing and abuse suffered in the institution setting of The Fifth Child, he and Teresa refuse any further tests.

Unable to convince the pair to cooperate with the tests, Ben is kidnapped and caged with animals in a laboratory. Teresa rescues him with the help of Alfredo, who works at the compound and is an emerging love interest for Teresa.

After being rescued, Ben is in despair about his repeated poor treatment and abandonment by those who say they care for him. Alfredo, in an attempt to cheer him up, claims to have seen people like Ben before, which excites Ben, who wants to be taken to see them.

The group trek into the mountains to see Ben's people. As it turns out, those people are only rock paintings. Ben is the only person of his species still alive - he is a step backwards in evolution. The crushing despair Ben feels leads him to throw himself off the edge of a cliff.

== Characters ==
- Ben Lovatt. The fifth child of Harriet and David Lovatt, born different.
- The Lovatts. Ben's family. Consists of his mother Harriet, father David, and his siblings Luke, Helen, Jane, and Paul.
- Mrs. Biggs. An elderly woman who looks after Ben for a while.
- Rita. A courtesan that Ben becomes interested in.
- Johnston. The owner of a minicab company and Rita's pimp.
- Alex. A film director and producer interested in making a movie about Ben.
- Teresa. A courtesan turned actress interested in helping Ben.
- Inez. Teresa's friend, and a scientist with a keen interest in Ben.
- Alfredo. The man sent by the Scientific Institute to convince Ben to submit to testing, who eventually turns traitor and takes Ben to see 'his people'.

== Reception ==
In his review for The New York Times, Michael Pye said the book "lets you see things as Ben sees them, as you have not seen things before. The book shares that uncanny effect with the best fiction." In her analysis of Lessing's experimental comments on literary genre, Susan Watkins argues that by exaggerating the picaresque, Lessing forces her readers "to ask a series of questions about the meaning of the distinction between the animal and the human." Watkins finds that Ben is "a marginal figure, critical of society but unable to find a place outside it", like a picaro hero. Lessing uses the figure of Ben "as a way to comment on a society experiencing intense social upheaval." While the traditional picaro is a semi-outsider, Ben is much more isolated. Furthermore, it is far more in doubt if he is able "to survive by his wits and turn a series of exploitative situations to his advantage (another feature of the genre)." Watkins observes that in Ben, in the World prolepsis is used to a humorous effect by which the 'objectivity' of the narrator's voice is being parodied. The device of omniscience is exaggerated so that the reader is made to see how naïve it is to believe in what the narrator relates. Another effect of this is, according to Watkins, that the reliability of perception is questioned and that any 'commons sense' judgments about Ben's alleged difference from others are called into doubt.

By its depicting an outsider, Ben, in the World has been compared to Bartleby, the Scrivener (1853) by Herman Melville, to The Metamorphosis (1912) by Franz Kafka, to The Stranger (1942) by Albert Camus, to Nineteen Eighty-Four (1949) by George Orwell, to The Bluest Eye (1970) by Toni Morrison, and to Unaccustomed Earth (2008) by Jhumpa Lahiri.
