= The Diaries of Jane Somers =

1984 novel by Doris Lessing

- Paperback cover
- Author: Doris Lessing
- Language: English
- Genre: Novel
- Publisher: Vintage Books
- Publication date: 1984
- Publication place: United States
- Media type: Print
- Pages: 502
- ISBN: 9780394729558

The Diaries of Jane Somers is a book by Nobel Prize-winning author Doris Lessing which contains two novels she previously published under the pseudonym Jane Somers. The original books were published in 1983 and 1984 with the titlesThe Diary of a Good Neighbour and If the Old Could….

In the preface to The Diaries of Jane Somers, Lessing explains her motivation for writing pseudonymous novels, including her hope to be reviewed in a new light without the associations with her prior work. She discusses the reaction of publishers and reviewers to Jane Somers' work, and illustrates the challenges for writers, agents, publishers, reviewers and sellers in creating and marketing books.

== The Diary of a Good Neighbour by Jane Somers ==
In this 1983 novel, Janna Somers is a magazine editor living in 1970's London whose life is shaken up after her husband dies. Janna befriends a feisty elderly woman, fascinated by her history and appalled at her living conditions. Janna's diary records her friendship with Maudie; building her career and what she loves about working; and reflections on her own family relationships.

A 1983 review of the original The Diary of a Good Neighbor in The Atlantic called the book "a grim story, but interesting and intelligent." Kirkus Reviews said "while somewhat unsatisfying as a novel ... there's power in the notion of a woman forced to re-assess her life when confronted by an old, dying mirror-image."

In a 2021 article, Fiona Tolan addressed feminist themes and the value afforded to women’s labor in the The Diary of a Good Neighbour. Janna Somers “embodies a certain mode of 1980s liberal feminist success,” which contrasts with her sister who is raising four children. The care, cleaning and feeding that Janna offers Maudie is a revelation to the childless Janna. Most of the characters are women, including the social workers and elderly neighborhood women, as well as Janna’s co-workers. The cast of characters allows the author to consider different women’s responsibilities and attitudes towards work.

== If the Old Could... by Jane Somers ==
In the 1984 sequel to The Diary of a Good Neighbour, fifty-year-old Janna starts an intense love affair with Richard, a British man who has been living in America. They are mutually besotted, yet unwilling to share some areas of their lives. Janna also deals with her niece Kate, who comes to stay with her.

A 1984 review in the New York Times said “the problems of older women and sex, of loneliness, and of the generation gap are all central to this novel's theme, and the author grapples fair and square with them all” and “this novel fails to achieve greatness, in spite of its sharpness and honesty, I think, because the writing style is essentially that of the soap opera.” Kirkus Reviews said it’s an “earnest, upper-middle-class romantic flutter--without the non-Jane focus that made Diary of a Good Neighbour modestly substantial.”

== Reaction to The Diaries of Jane Somers ==
Later in 1984, Lessing revealed that she was Jane Somers when she published The Diaries of Jane Somers under her own name. The New York Times described Lessing’s use of a pen name as a ruse attempting to dramatize the difficulties faced by unknown writers. They described Lessing’s process for submitting the Jane Somers books to publishers in Britain and America, including Lessing’s long-time British publisher, Jonathan Cape. In 2013, James Lasden told the story of how, at age 23, he was the in-house reader who rejected Jane Somers submission to Jonathan Cape Publishers. He also describes how this came to haunt him, as he now reads and admires Lessing’s work.

In their review of The Diaries of Jane Somers, the New Yorker described Lessing’s desire to “break away from herself,” citing Lessing in the preface to the book as saying “Jane Somers knew nothing about a kind of dryness, like a conscience, that monitors Doris.” But they characterize Somers’ writing as “dogged labyrinthine interior monologue, explanatory phrases, irregular rhythm of the prose, expressionistic punctuation, artless first name dropping—the dryness, like a conscience: pure Doris Lessing.”, expressing surprise that readers were fooled.
