= David Gladwell =

British film editor and director (born 1935)

- Born: 1935 (age 90–91); United Kingdom
- Occupations: Film editor, film director, artist

David Gladwell (born 1935) is a British film editor, director and artist.

His most notable films as editor include If.... (1968) and O Lucky Man! (1973) both by director Lindsay Anderson. In 1981, Gladwell directed the adaptation of the Doris Lessing novel Memoirs of a Survivor starring Julie Christie.

His other films include the feature Requiem for a Village (1975), and the short films A Summer Discord (1955), Miss Thompson Goes Shopping (1958), The Great Steam Fair (1964), An Untitled Film (1964), 28b Camden Street (1965), Port Health (1967), Dance (1967), New Ways At Northgate (1969), Aberdeen By Seaside and Deeside (1970), Demolition (1971), Antoni Tapies (1979) and Earthstars (1985).
