= Landlocked (novel) =

1965 novel by Doris Lessing

- First edition
- Author: Doris Lessing
- Language: English
- Series: Children of Violence
- Genre: Novel
- Published: 1965
- Publisher: MacGibbon & Kee
- Publication place: United Kingdom
- Media type: Print
- Pages: 352
- ISBN: 0061991821
- Preceded by: A Ripple from the Storm
- Followed by: The Four-Gated City

Landlocked (1965) is the fourth novel in British Nobel Prize in Literature-winner Doris Lessing five volume, semi-autobiographical, series, Children of Violence. The first volume is Martha Quest (1952), and the others are, A Proper Marriage (1954), A Ripple from the Storm (1958), and The Four-Gated City (1969). The Children of Violence series, follows the life of protagonist Martha Quest "from girlhood to middle age".

This is the last of the series that is set in southern Africa: "The time is the last few months of a war that had not only ruined Europe but had flooded a message of equality even into this backwater. Some of the white people have already sensed the imminence of change: they could never again unthinkingly hold down this corner of Africa for themselves and their heirs".
