= Pat Keen =

English actress (1933–2013)

Patricia Margaret "Pat" Keen (21 October 1933 – 1 March 2013) was an English actress whose career on stage, television and film ran from the 1950s to the 2000s.

Born in Willesden, Brent, London, Keen trained at the Central School of Speech and Drama in the company of the novelist Paul Bailey, and after graduating in 1956, was offered a job at the Oxford Playhouse. Her first West End appearance came with the role of Margaret in the first stage production of Robert Bolt's A Man for All Seasons in 1960, in which Susannah York was cast in the later film version.

Before acting, she worked for two years in the Foreign Office, which she attributed to her ability to speak French.

In David Copperfield (1974), a Sunday tea time serial for the BBC, Keen played the "perfect" Clara Peggotty, however the actress was best known for playing strident, bossy middle-aged women throughout the 1970s and 1980s, such as Virginia in the Fawlty Towers episode "The Anniversary" (1979), and as an anxious mother in Clockwise (1986). She was also known for playing Addy (the mother in law) in the TV series Down to Earth (2000–2001).

== Death ==
During her later life, Keen resided in Ipswich. Becoming increasingly frail, she moved to a nursing home in April 2009, where she died on 1 March 2013, aged 79, from undisclosed causes. She was survived by her sister Angela Yeo, three nieces and a nephew.

== Partial filmography ==
- A Kind of Loving (1962) – Christine Harris
- The Sailor's Return (1979) – Mrs. Bascombe
- Memoirs of a Survivor (1981) – Victorian Mother
- Clockwise (1986) – Mrs. Wisely
- We Think the World of You (1988) – Miss Sweeting
- Without a Clue (1988) – Mrs. Hudson
- The Rachel Papers (1989) – Mrs. Tauber
- Shadowlands (1993) – Mrs. Young
- Fierce Creatures (1997) – Woman's Mother
