= Alfred and Emily =

2008 book by Doris Lessing

- First edition (UK)
- Author: Doris Lessing
- Language: English
- Publisher: Fourth Estate
- Publication date: 2008
- Publication place: United Kingdom
- Media type: Print (hardback & paperback)
- ISBN: 978-0-00-723345-8

Alfred and Emily is a book by Doris Lessing in a new hybrid form. Part fiction, part notebook, part memoir, it was first published in 2008. The book is based on the lives of Lessing's parents. Part one is a novella, a fictional portrait of how her parents' lives might have been without the interruption of the First World War. Part two is a retelling of how her parents' lives really developed.

== Plot synopsis ==
The novella begins in England in 1902, when Alfred and Emily meet at a cricket match. However, as the story progresses to 1916, the pair do not marry, as they did in real life. The absence of the war from this fictional portrait means that Alfred is spared his crippling war wounds and Emily is spared her real-life role as nurse, enduring the agony of nursing desperately ill soldiers without the aid of morphine. Instead the couple flourish separately. Alfred becomes a farmer and shares a happy marriage with Betsy. Emily marries a doctor, but he soon dies, and she is left a childless and wealthy widow. She channels her financial resources into philanthropic projects such as establishing schools for the poor. At the end of part one, there is an explanatory section written from an authorial perspective, followed by two portraits of a man and an encyclopaedic entry about the hospital that Emily worked in. This reprint of an existing entry in turn is followed by a photo taken in a hospital room showing a patient and a nurse.

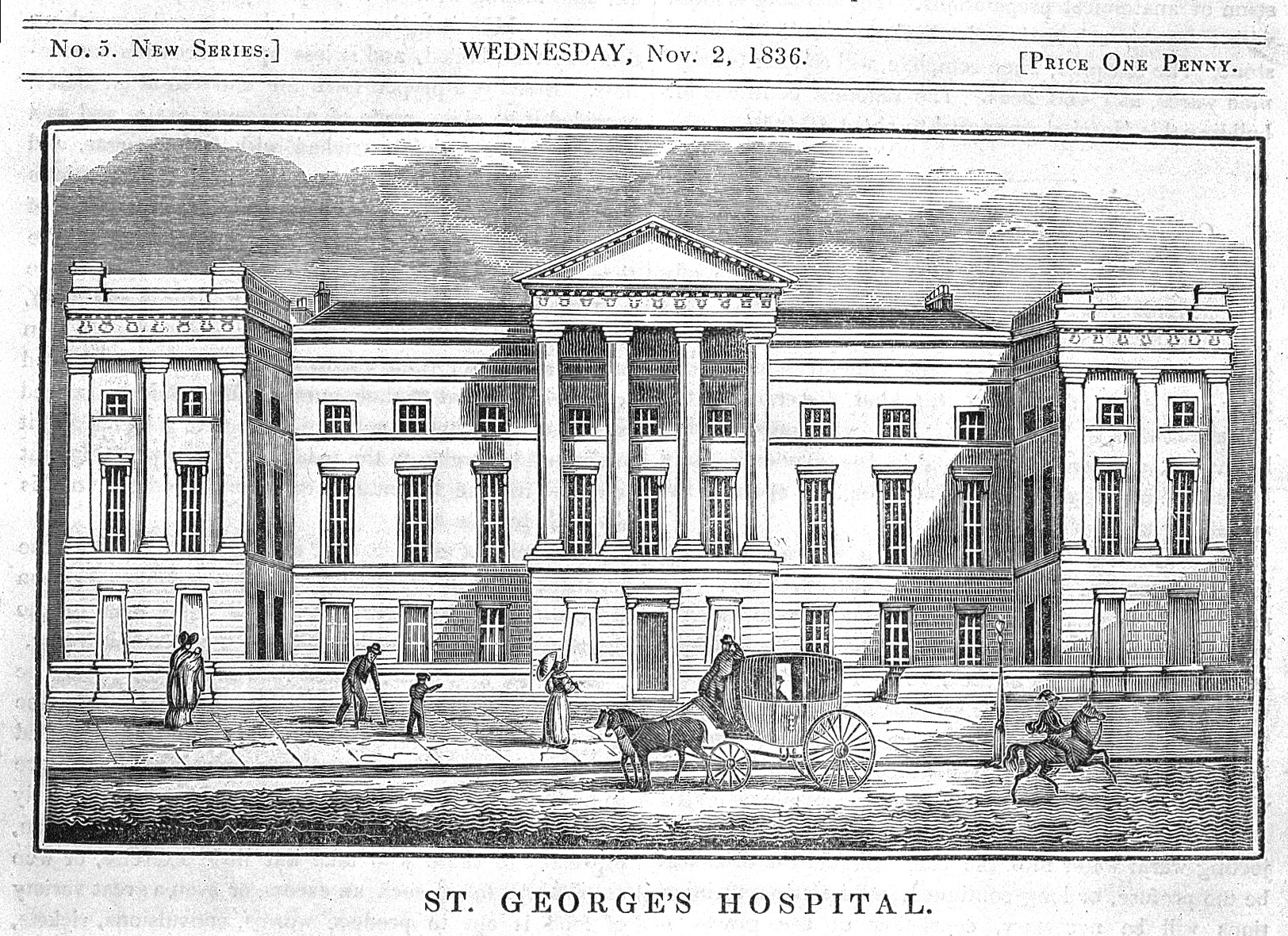
St George's Hospital, London, ca. 1836, where Emily intends to work as a nurse before the First World War is started

The second part of the book transports Alfred and Emily to the stage in their married life when they were farming, unhappily, in Southern Rhodesia. Their unhappiness is explained in a series of episodes from Lessing's own childhood.

== Reception ==
Tim Adams for The Guardian described the book as "perfectly crafted" and a "quietly extraordinary meditation on family", observing that between part one and part two there is a gap which "is the one in which the writer has always lived." Caryn James in The New York Times observed that "this book continues [Lessing's] obsession with alternate realities" and she sees it as an "entire project" that "is more revealing than either part of the book alone", by documenting that Lessing "at 88, [is] still ferociously grappling with the meaning of her parents' shattered lives." She concluded with praise: "In its generosity of spirit, its shaped and contained fury, Alfred and Emily is also an extraordinary, unconventional addition to Lessing’s autobiography." Valerie Sayers in The Washington Post saw Alfred and Emily as proving Lessing's "ongoing interest in formal experimentation", in this case finding "two ingenious forms". She applauded the work as "a clever, moving coupling of fiction and nonfiction" to the effect that by "allowing her readers this insight into the connection between autobiography and fiction, between form and content, she reaffirms fiction's powers and possibilities."

== A new hybrid form ==
There is some disagreement about the significance of the book's structure and the respective reading quality of its parts. According to Susan Williams, Alfred and Emily is made up of two parts, or "rather, it is two books. The first is a novella, in which she rewrites their lives; the second is based on fact." In the first part "Lessing abolishes the First World War", the second part comes as a contrast: "But whereas the first part is a page-turning narrative, this is disjointed and edgy, with no clear framework." Bernadette Conrad's praise reads the other way round. According to her point of view, the first part makes too shallow reading. Instead, she holds that the second part is a precious piece of literature that deserves a reader's attention because Lessing reworks her longstanding topics masterfully, and with a loving gesture towards her otherwise hated mother. Conrad finds it remarkable that Lessing should achieve such a rehabilitation not in the fictional part but in part two – where her mother's real life is remembered. Virginia Tiger points out that the book's hybrid form is new: "triptych-like in form", plus a foreword informing the reader about "the authorial intention for this tripartite strategy." Tiger identifies three panels: a novella, a notebook ("Explanation"), and a memoir. The notebook, one of Lessing's famous formats (echoing her 1962 classic, The Golden Notebook) according to Tiger has the function of offering "an authorial gloss on the novella's imaginative mulch." The reason she finds Alfred and Emily confounding and exasperating is that there are two more sections following the Explanation: an encyclopaedic entry and an epigraph. She also takes the photographs into account, especially the one of Emily as a nurse at St. George's hospital, and she observes that "fact and fiction do not so much blur as bleed into one another." Tiger sides with Conrad when she writes that the novella is "barely coherent, even wooden" and that its prose is "enervated when not convoluted." Other reasons include that she finds the novella's narrative not compelling since "memorial commentary dispels the invented world" by interrupting it with a couple of prolepses, to the effect that "the temporal now of fiction is dislodged." Judith Kegan Gardiner thinks that in Alfred and Emily Lessing's "deliberate teasing of the readers' desires to collapse fiction into autobiography" is "even more striking" than in The Golden Notebook. Roberta Rubenstein singles out the last two chapters as unique. She reads "Getting-off-the-Farm" and "Servant Problems" as appendices to "the process of filial reconciliation." Last but not least, here is a statement that may be taken to illustrate hybridity in yet another shape: ″Alfred and Emily is unusual in being both fiction and non-fiction at once: the same story told in two different ways – a double throw of the dice″, finds Blake Morrison in his review in The Guardian.

== The Parts ==
Foreword

Alfred and Emily

- (A photo of a young man in cricket outfit, standing; no caption)
- (A portrait of a young woman; no caption)
- PART ONE. Alfred and Emily: a novella
  - "1902"
  - "August 1905"
  - "August 1907"
  - "The Best Years"
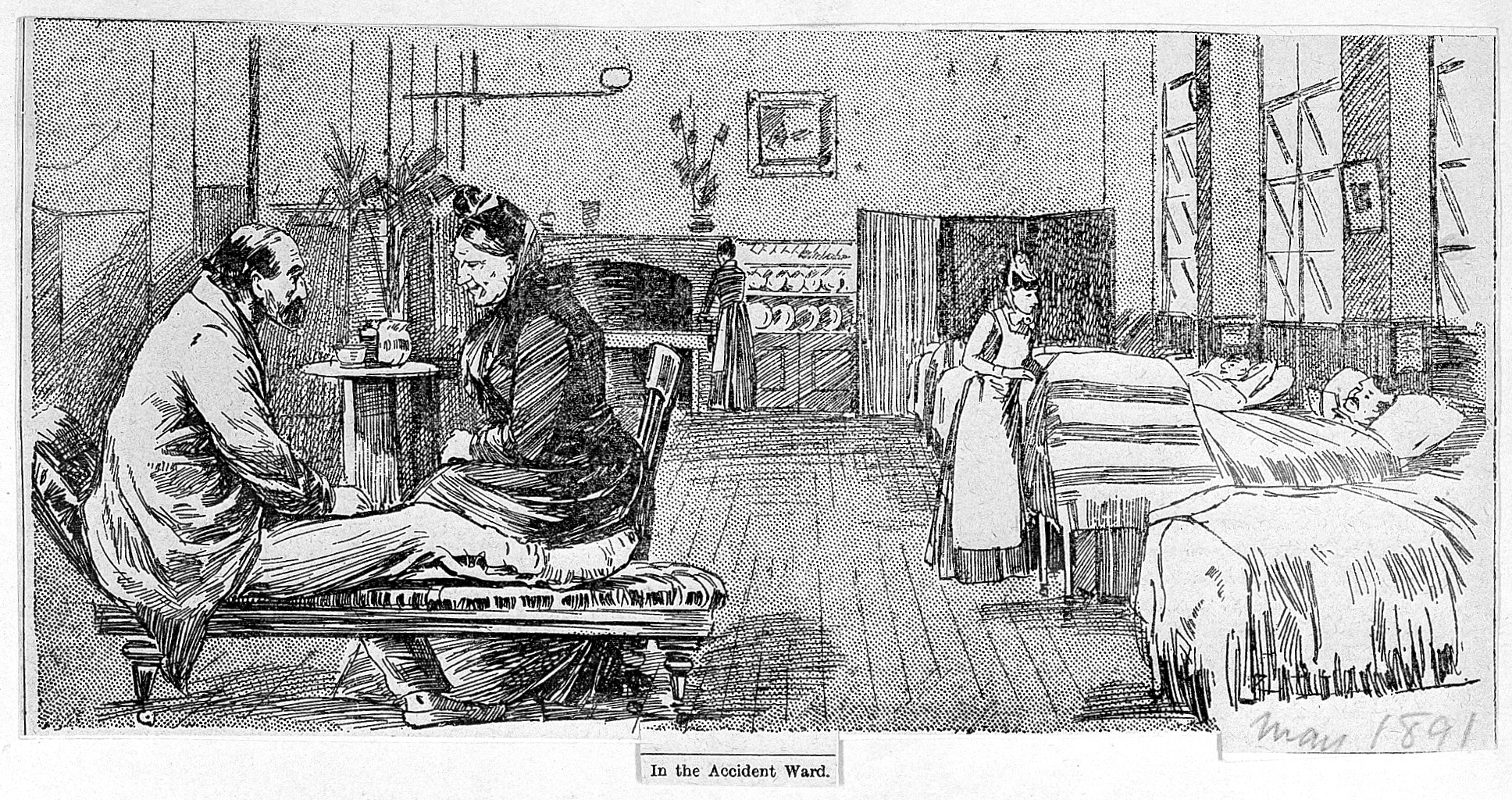
    Ca. 1891, nurse and patient in the accident ward of the Royal Free Hospital, London
  - (Epitaphs for Alfred and for Emily)
  - "Explanation" (a notebook)
  - (Two photos of the same man, first a portrait, overleaf standing; no captions)
  - "From The London Encyclopaedia, edited by Ben Weinreb and Christopher Hibbert, 1983" (contains the entry "Royal Free Hospital, Pond Street, Hampstead, NW 3" plus a photo taken in a hospital room, with a male patient and a female nurse; no caption)
- PART TWO. Alfred and Emily; Two Lives
  - (A photo of a man and a woman; no caption)
  - (An epigraph being a quote from D. H. Lawrence, Lady Chatterley's Lover)
  - (An untitled chapter starting with "I have written about my father in various ways; in pieces long and short, and in novels" ...)
  - "A Women's Group, Informal, Casual" (includes one photo of a person working with oxen and later three family photos; no captions)
  - "Sister McVeagh" (includes one photo of a farmhouse with trees; no caption)
  - "Insects"
  - "The Old Mawonga Tree"
  - "Provisions"
  - "Provisions – In Town"
  - "My Brother Harry Tayler"
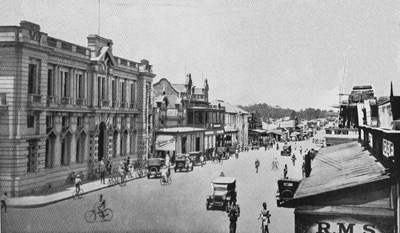
    1930, town centre of former Salisbury, today Harare, Zimbabwe
  - "Getting-off-the-Farm" (appendix 1)
  - "Servant Problems" (appendix 2)

== See also ==
- 2008 in literature
- List of English Heritage blue plaques in Camden
