= Through the Tunnel =

1955 short story by Doris Lessing

First standalone edition Published by Creative Education (US)

"Through the Tunnel" is a short story written by British author Doris Lessing, originally published in the American weekly magazine The New Yorker in 1955.

== Plot ==
Jerry, a young English boy, and his widowed mother are vacationing at a beach they have come to many times in years past. Though the beach’s exact location is not given, it is obviously in a foreign country. Each tries to please the other and not to impose too many demands. The mother is “determined to be neither possessive nor lacking in devotion,” and Jerry, in turn, acts from an “unfailing impulse of contrition — a sort of chivalry.”

On the second morning, Jerry mentions that he would like to explore a “wild and rocky bay” which he glimpsed from the path. He wanted to act grown-up and not constantly travel with his mother. His conscientious mother sends him on his way with what she hopes is a casual air, and Jerry leaves behind the crowded “safe beach” where he has always played. A strong swimmer, Jerry plunges in and goes so far out that he can see his mother only as a small yellow speck on the other beach.

Looking back to shore, Jerry sees some boys strip off their clothes and go running down to the rocks, and he swims toward them but keeps his distance. The boys are “of that coast; all of them were burned smooth dark brown and speaking a language he did not understand. To be with them, of them was a craving that filled his whole body.” He watches the boys, who are older and bigger than he is, until finally one waves at him and Jerry swims eagerly over. As soon as they realize he is a foreigner, though, they forget about him, but he is happy just to be among them.

Jerry joins them in diving off a high point into the water for a while, and then the biggest boy dives in and does not come up. “One moment, the morning seemed full of chattering boys; the next, the air and the surface of the water were empty. But through the heavy blue, dark shapes could be seen moving and groping.” Jerry dives down, too, and sees a “black wall of rock looming at him.” When the boys come up one by one on the other side of the rock, he “understood that they had swum through some gap or hole in it. . . . [However] he could see nothing through the stinging salt water but the blank rock.” Jerry feels failure and shame, yelling at them first in English and then in nonsensical French, the “pleading grin on his face like a scar that he could never remove.”

The boys dive into the water all around him, and he panics when they do not come back to the surface. Only when he has mentally counted to 160 does he admit that they are gone for sure. Believing they are leaving to get away from him, he “cries himself out.”

He spends the next several days contemplating swimming through the rock tunnel himself, and he practices holding his breath underwater. After one round of practice, his nose bleeds so badly that he becomes dizzy and nauseated, and he worries that the same might happen in the tunnel, that he really might die there, trapped. He resolves to wait until the day before he leaves when his mother says they will be gone in four days, but an impulse overtakes him two days beforehand, and he feels that he must make his attempt immediately — now or never. “He was trembling with fear that he would not go; and he was trembling with horror at the long, long tunnel under the rock, under the sea.”

Once inside the tunnel he begins counting, swimming cautiously, feeling both victory and panic. “He must go on into the blackness ahead, or he would drown. His head was swelling, his lungs cracking. . . . He was no longer quite conscious.” Even when he surfaces, he fears “he would sink now and drown; he could not swim the few feet back to the rock.”

In "Through the Tunnel", the literal passage through the rock tunnel becomes a coming-of-age passage for Jerry. Having accomplished his challenge, he returns to his mother's company, satisfied and confident of the future. He does not feel it necessary to tell his mother of the monumental obstacle that he has overcome.

== See also ==
- Rite of passage
- Bildungsroman
