= The Fifth Child =

1988 novel by Doris Lessing

- First edition
- Author: Doris Lessing
- Language: English
- Publisher: Jonathan Cape
- Publication date: 1988
- Publication place: United Kingdom
- Media type: Print (Hardback & Paperback)
- Pages: 159
- ISBN: 0-224-02553-8
- OCLC: 21411827
- Followed by: Ben, in the World

The Fifth Child is a short novel by the British writer Doris Lessing, first published in the United Kingdom in 1988, and since translated into several languages. It describes the changes in the happy life of a married couple, Harriet and David Lovatt, as a consequence of the birth of Ben, their fifth child. A sequel, Ben, in the World (2000) recounts Ben's life after he has left his family.

== Plot summary ==
When David Lovatt meets Harriet at a party, they both immediately fall in love. They both share the same conservative outlooks, which they perceive to be a rarity in the immoral London of the 1960s.

The two marry and purchase a large house in a small town within commuting distance of London. The couple intends to have several children—a wish frowned upon by the rest of the family. By the time they have four children–two boys and two girls–their house becomes a centre of joy not only for them but for all their relatives and friends who come and visit. This continues until Harriet has a fifth, wildly dysfunctional child, Ben. Her painful pregnancy with him marks the beginning of the misery and suffering that this child brings to the whole family.

== Characters ==
- Harriet Lovatt. Main female character. Married to David Lovatt
- David Lovatt. Main male character. Married to Harriet Lovatt
  - Luke. Harriet's and David's first child
  - Helen. Harriet's and David's second child
  - Jane. Harriet's and David's third child
  - Paul. Harriet's and David's fourth child
  - Ben. Harriet's and David's fifth child and the focus of the story
- James Lovatt. David's and Deborah's father. He has divorced Molly and married Jessica instead.
- Molly.
  - Deborah Lovatt. David's sister
- Dorothy. Harriet's mother
- Sarah. Harriet's sister. She is married to William and has children with him, one being Amy, who has Down syndrome.
- Angela. Harriet's sister
- John. A young man who takes care of Ben. He goes away to Manchester for a job-training offer.
- Mary Jones. A girl Ben injures
- Dr. Gilly. A specialist that Harriet and Ben see in London
- Billy, Derek, Vic, and Elvis. Several boys whose gang Ben joins when he's older
