= Children of Violence =

Series of novels by Doris Lessing

Children of Violence is a sequence of five semi-autobiographical novels by British Nobel Prize in Literature-winner Doris Lessing: Martha Quest (1952), A Proper Marriage (1954), A Ripple from the Storm (1958), Landlocked (1965), and The Four-Gated City (1969). The novels "are strongly influenced by Lessing's rejection of a domestic family role and her involvement with communism." Lessing identified the series as a bildungsroman.

The series follows the life of protagonist Martha Quest from adolescence until her death, which takes place in the future, in the year 1997. The first four novels are set during the 1930s and 1940s, in the fictional country of Zambesia, based on the former British colony of Southern Rhodesia (now Zimbabwe), where Lessing lived from 1925 until 1949. The fifth work, The Four-Gated City, is set in London, primarily in the 1950s and 1960s. The novel's appendix extends into a dystopian future in which Britain has become uninhabitable due to an unspecified catastrophe, speculated to be either a nuclear detonation or mass contamination from chemical weapons following a fire at Porton Down.

== Books ==
- Martha Quest (1952)
- A Proper Marriage (1954)
- A Ripple from the Storm (1958)
- Landlocked (1965)
- The Four-Gated City (1969)
