= Martha Quest =

1952 novel by Doris Lessing

- First edition
- Author: Doris Lessing
- Cover artist: Peter Rudland
- Language: English
- Series: Children of Violence
- Publisher: Michael Joseph
- Publication date: 1952
- Publication place: United Kingdom
- Media type: Print
- Pages: 320
- ISBN: 0451028740
- Followed by: A Proper Marriage

Martha Quest (1952) is the second novel of British Nobel Prize in Literature-winner Doris Lessing, and the first of the five-volume semi-autobiographical Children of Violence series, which traces Martha Quest’s life to middle age. The other volumes in The Children of Violence are A Proper Marriage (1954), A Ripple from the Storm (1958), Landlocked (1965), and The Four-Gated City (1969).

Martha Quest is set in the former British colony of Southern Rhodesia, now Zimbabwe, in southern Africa, where Lessing lived from 1925 until 1949. At the beginning of the novel Martha is fifteen years old, "living on an impoverished African farm with her parents; a girl of passionate vitality, avid for experience and for self-knowledge, bitterly resentful of the conventional narrowness of her home life". She then becomes a typist in the provincial capital where "she begins to encounter the real life she is so eager to experience and understand." Lessing's first novel The Grass Is Singing published in 1950, also takes place in Southern Rhodesia, and, set during the 1940s, deals with the racial politics between the British settlers and Africans in that country.

Novelist C. P. Snow, in a review of Martha Quest for The Sunday Times, described Lessing as "one of the most powerfully equipped young novelists now writing."

== Autobiographical novel ==
Martha Quest, like much of Lessing's fiction, is autobiographical. In it she draws "upon her childhood memories and her serious engagement with politics and social concerns", which "emerge out of her experiences in Africa", and Martha Quest, like other of Lessing's works set in Africa, that were "published during the fifties and early sixties, decry the dispossession of black Africans by white colonials, and expose the sterility of the white culture in southern Africa". In 1956, Lessing's courageous outspokenness led her to being declared a prohibited alien in both Southern Rhodesia and South Africa.

== Bibliography ==
- Mohammad Kaosar Ahmed & Sultana JahanSeeing Herself through Literature: Martha Quest’s Reading Habit in Doris Lessing’s The Children of Violence
- Frederick J. Solinger Nostalgia for the Future: Remembrance of Things to Come in Doris Lessing’s Martha Quest by, from ariel: A Review of International English Literature, Volume 45, Number 3, July 2014, pp. 75–99 (subscription required)
- Jessica Teisch Doris Lessing: Book by Book Profile
- Lamia Tayeb Martha's Odyssey: the Motif of the Journey in Doris Lessing's The Children of Violence
- Gayle Greene Doris Lessing: The Poetics of Change (ISBN 9780472084333)
- Laya Sedhain Mainali Relationship Between Women and Knowledge in Lessing´s The Summer Before the Dark, Martha Quest and A Proper Marriage (bachelor thesis, submitted at Luleå University of Technology
