= The Memoirs of a Survivor =

1974 novel by Doris Lessing

- UK first edition
- Author: Doris Lessing
- Language: English
- Publisher: Octagon Press (UK); Alfred A. Knopf (US)
- Publication date: 1974
- ISBN: 0-900860-30-8
- OCLC: 1208042
- Dewey Decimal: 823/.9/14
- LC Class: PR6023.E833 M4 PR6023.E833

The Memoirs of a Survivor is a dystopian novel by Nobel Prize-winner Doris Lessing. It was first published in 1974 by Octagon Press, and Alfred A. Knopf in the U.S. in 1975. It was made into a film in 1981, starring Julie Christie and Nigel Hawthorne, and directed by David Gladwell.

== Plot summary ==
The story takes place in a near-future Britain where society has broken down due to an unspecified disaster, referred to as "The Crisis." The new society that emerges after the collapse retains many features of the old world but is fundamentally different. What serves as a government in the post-crisis nation is unable to consolidate its authority and exercises little control over the populace. Newscasts can be heard and law and order are upheld by vigilantes and a handful of policemen. Education exists for those who pass as the wealthier survivors, while schools for the poor act as an apparatus of the army and are designed to control the population. Limited commercial activity continues, but scavenging is required to obtain rare goods.

By the start of the novel, the situation in the society is starting to deteriorate as the edifice of the past society crumbles. The narrator describes people moving out of the city, and empty shelves indicate a food shortage. Rationing is in effect, and gangs migrate through the city block by block attacking residents. Many of the narrator's neighbours want to move out of the city as the situation becomes worse.

The narrator, a middle-aged woman who lives a quiet life in a flat, unexpectedly ends up with 'custody' of a teenage girl named Emily Cartwright and her cat Hugo. The narrator seeks to please the new arrival and works hard to ensure that Emily has a high opinion of her. She often comments on Emily's competence and neatness and ponders the purpose of the girl's existence. Emily herself is intelligent and insightful but is also quite distant. The narrator and Emily somewhat enjoy each other's company and seem to form a tacit arrangement of tolerance between them.

This idyllic time (in the words of the narrator) ends when a gang of young people take up residence in the community. Emily goes out to meet them but retreats when they tease her and threaten Hugo. Later that evening she meets with the gang again, and this time enjoys herself. Upon returning home, she remarks to the narrator that the gang members are at least able to enjoy themselves. Many different gangs pass through the community in the next few months, and Emily always interacts with them. This, coupled with Emily's abrasive wit, creates friction between her and the narrator, though the latter weathers Emily's remarks and remains stoic.

As Emily grows older, she exhibits more and more signs of adolescence. She designs her own clothes, gains then loses weight, and works ardently to become more attractive. As the story progresses, a group of similar minded young people from the community begin to form a gang of their own, modelled after the previous gangs that visited the community. Emily happily joins them in their nightly revelry. Soon it becomes apparent that the gang is going to depart from the community, and the narrator believes that Emily will leave with them. However, Emily is conflicted about leaving Hugo behind. She tries to introduce him to the gang, but no progress is made. The next day three of the gang members go to the flat where Emily and the narrator live with the intent to eat Hugo but are dissuaded by the presence of the Narrator. Emily learns of this occurrence and decides that, for the moment, she cannot leave her longtime companion behind. The gang soon splits into two groups, and Emily stays with the group that chooses not to depart.

The story continues to progress as Emily grows older. Outside of the narrator's flat, society begins to revert to a pre-industrial state, with agriculture becoming more and more common in the city. A few blocks away, a young man named Gerald organises dispossessed children into a new group and begins to establish a new gang. Emily becomes infatuated with Gerald, and it is implied that they form a physical relationship. Emily's influence in the community continues to grow, and she is soon seen as one of the leaders of the young people. One day the narrator returns home and finds items missing from her flat. Emily finds out about this thievery, and orders the thieves (who are some of the children that she leads) to return the stolen goods, displaying her authority over the children and her ability to protect the narrator, who up until this point had protected her. She then leads the narrator upstairs, where a thriving market has formed in the upper floors of the apartment building.

Emboldened by his successes, Gerald continues to solidify his control over his group of followers. Emily often helps him, though friction is created between the two when Gerald seeks out other partners. Eventually, Gerald (who, according to the narrator, has too kind a heart) adopts feral children who had inhabited the sewers into his gang. However, the children are filthy and vicious, with their behaviour leading to the collapse of Gerald's formerly well-managed gang. The people of the community gather to discuss what should be done about the children when the police arrive and break up the meeting. Fearing that the eyes of the authorities (described as "them") have fallen upon the community, many of the narrator's neighbours flee in the following months.

Months go by and society continues to collapse. The feral children are ostensibly under Gerald's control, but often run wild in what remains of the neighbourhood. Water is in short supply, caravans and traders are often attacked, and it is implied that even the government is starting to abandon parts of the city. Emily and the narrator spend most of their time in the flat and are able to interact with the children due to Emily's relationship with Gerald, but both fear an attack in the future, as the children are actively raiding and killing other humans at night. By this point, most of the residents of the neighbourhood have departed for the lands to the north and west of the city, lands from which there is forebodingly no news. Eventually, the children turn on Gerald and attack him, while he remains incredulous that such young children could betray him. Emily is able to save Gerald and hurry him into the flat. Faced with a bleak existence, the small group of Emily, Gerald, Hugo, and the Narrator fall asleep, expecting an attack from the children. The narrator awakes to find that the wall has opened before her and a new world lies on the other side. Emily leads the group through, whereupon they step into a new, better world as the walls dissolve away.

Periodically, the narrator is able, through meditating on a certain wall (see above) in her flat, to traverse space and time. Many of these visions are about Emily's sad childhood under the care of her harsh mother and distant father. At the end of the novel, the main character's strange new family breaks through dimensional barriers via the wall and walks into a much better world.

== Concept and creation ==
Author Doris Lessing says this novel grew out of a "very hubristic" ambition to write an autobiography in dreams.

According to Jenny Diski, Emily is partly based on Diski, who lived with Lessing for some years as an adolescent.

== Reception ==
"Doris Lessing is not afraid to break through the barrier separating the mainstream from the fantastic, to let go of man's world," writes Marleen S. Barr in her essay in A Companion to Science Fiction. She argues that feminist science fiction novels such as Memoirs of a Survivor provide an alternate viewpoint that "dissolve walls that imprison women within a sexist reality." However, the warping of space and time presented in this novel led scholar Betsy Draine to label it a "failure", saying the shifts between realistic and mystical frames are impossible to follow. The New York Review of Books felt the ending, in which Emily leads the other main characters through the walls into another reality, was "reminiscent of a Technicolor fade-out into the sunset."

== Themes ==
The New York Times wrote, "Lessing's message, recognizable from her previous work, is close to W. H. Auden's 'We must love one another or die'." Although we will inevitably be defeated and disillusioned, we still need to care about other people."

Consciousness becomes a physical boundary represented by the wall of the narrator's home: "the rooms and garden beyond it are areas of the unconscious which she explores." The mystical dimension is given the author's tacit approval when she allows the principal characters to escape the dystopian reality by passing through the wall.

Another theme is that of breakdown, both of mechanised Western culture and of adult, mechanical personality.
