= Gottfried Lessing =

East German lawyer, political activist, and diplomat (1914–1979)

- Born: Gottfried Anton Nicolai Lessing; 14 December 1914; Petrograd, Russia
- Died: 11 April 1979 (aged 64); Kampala, Uganda
- Occupations: Lawyer; Diplomat
- Political party: SED
- Spouse(s): Doris Tayler (m. 1943; div. 1949) Ilse
- Children: 1

Gottfried Anton Nicolai Lessing (14 December 1914 – 11 April 1979) was a German lawyer, political activist, and diplomat.

== Life and career ==
Lessing was born in Petrograd, Russia to Gottfried Lessing (1877–1950) and Tatjana Lessing (née von Schwanebach) (1878 - 1960). He fled Germany in 1938 (one of his grandfathers was Jewish, and therefore he was considered a mischling under the Nuremberg Laws). First he sought refuge in the UK, and later he moved to Salisbury, Southern Rhodesia (now Harare, Zimbabwe). He worked as a lawyer in Salisbury from 1941 to 1946 and took part in the founding of the small Southern Rhodesia Communist Party, becoming a leading member. There he became involved with Doris Lessing (winner of the Nobel Prize for Literature in 2007). They were married from 1943 to 1949 and had one son. Doris Lessing's memoir, Under My Skin, includes a short biography of Gottfried Lessing and a detailed description of their life together in Harare.

In 1949 he returned to the UK, where he worked for the Communist Party of Great Britain. In 1950 he settled in East Berlin, and in 1951 he became a member of the Socialist Unity Party of Germany.

From 1952 to 1957 he was the president of the Chamber of Foreign Trade. Then, in 1959–1960, he led East Germany's trade representation in Indonesia. In 1961 he was sent to Mali. From 1962 to 1965 he was back in East Germany, working as the head of the Africa section at the Ministry of Foreign Affairs. Between 1965 and 1969, Lessing served as East Germany's Consul General in Tanzania. He again returned to East Germany, and worked in the Planning Section of the Ministry of Foreign Affairs.

Lessing went on to serve as the East German Ambassador to Uganda. He and his third wife were killed during the Fall of Kampala in 1979, as Tanzania and its Ugandan rebel allies occupied Uganda's capital and overthrew dictator Idi Amin. Lessing and his wife attempted to escape the city amid the fighting at 04:00 on 11 April, but as they drove by a golf course UNLF insurgents fired two rocket-propelled grenades at Lessing's and a following car, destroying both and killing the four occupants.

Lessing was the maternal uncle of politician Gregor Gysi.
