= The Sweetest Dream =

2001 novel by Doris Lessing

- First edition
- Author: Doris Lessing
- Language: English
- Publisher: Flamingo
- Publication date: 2001
- Publication place: United Kingdom
- Media type: Print (Hardback & Paperback)
- ISBN: 0-00-655230-7

The Sweetest Dream is a 2001 novel by British Nobel Prize in Literature-winner Doris Lessing. The novel begins in the 1960s leading up to the 1980s and is set in London and the fictional African nation, Zimlia, a thinly veiled reference to Zimbabwe.

== Plot summary ==
In 1960s' Hampstead, London, the large home of Julia Lennox is a gathering place for an assortment of young and old characters. Frances Lennox finds herself living with her mother-in-law, Julia after her husband Johnny, a communist leader has abandoned her and his two sons, Andrew and Colin to continue an affair with a glamorous "comrade". The arrangement is difficult owing to the natures of both women, Frances is independent-minded and Julia betrays her German background and is more rigid. However both women are united in their disapproval of Johnny. Rather than working, Johnny's priorities are travelling and staying at hotels in communist countries and all the while continuing with his affairs.

Frances later gives up her theatre ambitions for a more lucrative position on a liberal newspaper. The Lennox household becomes filled with the classmates and dropout friends of her two sons now in secondary school. Frances acts as an earth-mother figure to the adolescents, offering a communal atmosphere so different from their strict family homes. Johnny maintains a presence in the household, occasionally appearing to the benefits of free meals and the captive audience that the estranged adolescents provide at the kitchen table. Communist member, Rose Trimble is also a regular addition until she turns gutter-press journalist and attacks Frances and Julia, branding them "imperialists". Other colourful characters that abound in the household include Johnny's anorexic daughter, two of Johnny's wives; political refugees as well as a newly arrived young black boy Franklin, from Zimlia, Africa.

Meanwhile, Colin and Andrew make their transition into adulthood. Colin becomes a novelist and Andrew, a graduate of the London School of Economics, becomes an illustrious international finance figure, working with the corrupt African leaders and other Third World countries in order to help funnel money to their poverty-stricken nations. However Andrew is blind to the scale of the leaders' corruption and misuse of funding. Sylvia becomes a doctor, and finds herself at a mission in Zimlia where the locals live in dire poverty and are crippled by the spread of AIDS. The new black leader of Zimlia and his wife are immensely wealthy, and his ministers, as are his ministers such as the adult Franklin. These ministers continue to line their pockets as farms are expropriated from the nation's white farmers.

Sylvia returns to England with two black boys when her hospital in Zimlia is shut down. The boys move into the Lennox home where Frances is now in her early seventies, and shares the home with Colin and his family. Eventually a now impoverished Johnny returns to the home, as communism is replaced by capitalism in the countries he once visited.

== Reception ==
The Independent described the work as a "rare literary pleasure the kind you might have in suddenly coming upon a long lost novel by George Eliot or Balzac." The review continued to appreciate the "haunting brilliance of her characters, whom one feels one knows rather better than one's friends, the passion of her ideas and vision, remain undiminished." The Spectator described the work as "a startling, burningly committed book which, like all Lessing, contains a marvellous sense of possibilities opening as the fiction progresses, an enriching and absorbing conviction of change and growth." The Times described it as a "remarkable novel" that is notable for its "vigour and attack, and for its passionate interest in justice and goodness." Lessing wrote The Sweetest Dream in place of volume three of her autobiography that would have covered the same time period. She decided against the autobiography lest she offend "vulnerable" people.
