= The Four-Gated City =

1969 novel by Doris Lessing

- Author: Doris Lessing
- Language: English
- Series: Children of Violence
- Genre: Novel
- Publisher: MacGibbon & Kee
- Publication date: 1969
- Publication place: United Kingdom
- Media type: Print (hardcover and paperback)
- Pages: 712
- ISBN: 0061991821
- Preceded by: Landlocked

The Four-Gated City, published in 1969, is the concluding novel in British Nobel Prize-winning author Doris Lessing's five-volume, semi-autobiographical series The Children of Violence, which she began, in 1952, with Martha Quest. In The Four-Gated City Lessing moves the setting from Zambesia, a fictionalized version of Southern Rhodesia, to London. Martha "is integrally part of the social history of the time - the Cold War, the Aldermaston Marches, Swinging London, the deepening of poverty and social anarchy." The novel extends into science fiction, depicting a dystopian future following the destruction of Britain.

When published it created a stir with claims that it promoted communism. The Four-Gated City is one of Lessing's most important works.

== Plot summary ==
The Four-Gated City, set in postwar London, is structured in four sections with an appendix. Martha arrives in London around 1950 and accepts a job as live-in secretary to Mark Coldridge. Mark is a novelist with one son, Francis; his wife, Lynda, is in a psychiatric hospital. Martha intends this employment to be temporary, but she elects to stay with the Coldridge family after Mark's brother Colin defects to the Soviet Union, leaving behind his son, Paul. Colin's defection subjects the family to scrutiny by both the government and the press. Already more progressive than his Tory parents, Mark shifts politically to the left, briefly becoming a communist and, in the longer term, engaging actively with the anti-nuclear movement. Mark, Martha, and other members of the Coldridge family participate in the Aldermaston Marches.

Martha becomes integral to the family, remaining with them until the Coldridge house is "compulsorily purchased for demolition, or redevelopment" in the late 1960s. She assists Mark with his writing and political work, becomes his intermittent sexual partner, and helps to raise Francis and Paul to adulthood. She also develops a strong relationship with Lynda, who returns home and lives in the basement flat of the Coldridge house, still married to Mark, for most of the novel. Lynda has periodic "breakdowns", but in time Martha recognizes that Lynda "need never have been ill": instead, she has a legitimate capacity for telepathy, and had been "made a psychological cripple" by a society that could not grasp "the possibility that they were calling people mad who merely possessed certain faculties". Martha realizes that she possesses a similar capacity, which she develops over the course of "a decade of private experimenting." After Lynda divorces Mark, he remarries and moves abroad with his second wife.

The novel's appendix comprises a series of letters collected by Francis Coldridge's stepdaughter after "the Catastrophe", which took place in 1978. The specific nature of the Catastrophe is never specified, but Martha speculates in a letter that it was a nuclear detonation or a release of nerve gases following a fire at Porton Down. Most of the people of Britain are killed in this event, and the nation is largely rendered uninhabitable. Martha spends the last years of her life with a small group of refugees on an island off the northwest coast of Scotland and dies around 1997.

== Genre ==
In an author's note, Doris Lessing writes that The Four-Gated City “is what the Germans call a Bildungsroman.”" Yet the novel is not typical of the genre in some respects. As Susan A. Gohlman notes, while the stereotypical Bildungsroman protagonist is an “innocent young man,” Martha “is neither a man nor young” at the outset of the novel. The first four novels of the Children of Violence sequence “trace the heroine’s… formation from childhood to adulthood, characteristically emphasizing those experiences that place her in direct confrontation with life; also, they focus on her degree of success in assimilating these experiences as she attempts to find her niche in society.” Yet “at the final point of integration with society, the ultimate goal of the Bildungsprozess… Martha breaks with tradition: once she has reached the stage where she has learned all that her immediate world has to offer, she rejects, rather than affirms, the identity which she has created out of her experience.” Molly Hite observes, similarly, that “Martha, who for four volumes of the Children of Violence series has been a more or less conventional protagonist, dissolves into a series of roles, a vehicle for impersonal forces, one perspective on a version of a reality approached from other directions by other characters. Her individual experience is finally so unimportant to the plot that it is unclear when or how she dies… The effect of this diffusing of personality is to transform what had appeared to be a five-volume bildungsroman, the ongoing saga of a woman’s personal growth and development, into an experimental narrative that culminates in a repudiation of the assumptions about personality and history that make the bildungsroman possible.”

== Themes ==
The novel "takes on the medical profession", which it is suggested is "destroying [...] that part of humanity which is in fact most sensitive to evolution". It "criticizes the scientists who have created and perpetuate a climate in which "rationalism" has become a new God"; the novel further explores the possibilities of people having " 'extra-sensory perception', in varying degrees, but "have been brainwashed into suppressing it, and that schizophrenia is the name of our blindest contemporary prejudice".
