= The Golden Notebook =

1962 novel by Doris Lessing

- First edition cover
- Author: Doris Lessing
- Language: English
- Genre: Novel
- Publisher: Michael Joseph
- Publication date: 1962
- Publication place: United Kingdom
- Media type: Print (hardback and paperback)
- ISBN: 0-7181-0970-8
- OCLC: 595787
- Dewey Decimal: 823/.9/14
- LC Class: PZ3.L56684 Go5 PR6023.E833

The Golden Notebook is a 1962 novel by the British writer Doris Lessing. Like her two books that followed, it enters the realm of what Margaret Drabble in The Oxford Companion to English Literature called Lessing's "inner space fiction"; her work that explores mental and societal breakdown. The novel contains anti-war and anti-Stalinist messages, an extended analysis of communism and the Communist Party in England from the 1930s to the 1950s, and an examination of the budding sexual revolution and women's liberation movements.

The book numbered among a 2005 TIME magazine list of the 100 best English-language novels since 1923. Translated editions include French, Polish, Italian, Swedish, Hungarian, and Hebrew.

== Plot summary ==
The Golden Notebook is the story of writer Anna Wulf, the four notebooks in which she records her life, and her attempt to tie them together in a fifth, gold-coloured notebook.

The book intersperses segments of an ostensibly realistic narrative of the lives of Anna and her friend Molly Jacobs as well as their children, ex-husbands and lovers—entitled Free Women—with excerpts from Anna's four notebooks, coloured black (of Anna's experience in Southern Rhodesia, before and during World War II, which inspired her own best-selling novel), red (of her experience as a member of the Communist Party), yellow (an ongoing novel that is being written based on the painful ending of Anna's own love affair), and blue (Anna's personal journal where she records her memories, dreams, and emotional life).

Each notebook is returned to four times, interspersed with episodes from Free Women, creating non-chronological, overlapping sections that interact with one another.

== Major themes ==
Lessing, in her preface, claimed that the most important theme in the novel is fragmentation; the mental breakdown that Anna suffers, perhaps from the compartmentalization of her life reflected in the division of the four notebooks but also reflecting the fragmentation of society. Anna's relationship and attempt to draw everything together in the golden notebook at the end of the novel are both the final stage of her intolerable mental breakdown, and her attempt to overcome the fragmentation and madness.

== Author's comments ==
In a 1994 interview by the New York Times Lessing said she found The Golden Notebook's fate mystifying. Its enduring success surprised her, and the feminist movement it helped to spawn disappoints and frustrates her. "There was this explosion of energy with feminism, but what happened is, they talked their energy away," Mrs. Lessing says. "Things have changed for white, middle-class women, but nothing has changed outside this group."

She recalled a "very dramatic little scene" during one of her visits back to Zimbabwe after 25 years of banishment as a "prohibited immigrant" for her criticism of apartheid: "There were a couple of American feminists, expertly dressed, lecturing a bunch of women who were raising kids on a level of about $70 to $80 a month in American money, about their sex lives, how to raise their children, how to treat their husbands." The feminists struck her as latter-day ideological imperialists, liberated most of all, she says, from "a sense of the ridiculous."

== Characters ==
- Anna (Freeman) Wulf: Writer. Main character of Free Women and writer of the notebooks.
- Max Wulf: Anna's ex-husband
- Janet Wulf: Anna and Max's daughter
- Molly Jacobs: Actress, Anna's friend.
- Richard Portmain: Molly's ex-husband
- Tommy Portmain: Molly's -- and Richard's -- son
- Marion Portmain: Richard's second wife
- Michael: Anna's former lover
- Willi (Wilhelm) Rodde (Black Notebook): Anna's boyfriend, refugee from Germany, based on Max Wulf.
- Paul Blackenhurst (Black Notebook): Royal Air Force Pilot
- Ted Brown (Black Notebook): Royal Air Force pilot, socialist.
- Jimmy McGrath (Black Notebook): Royal Air Force pilot. Homosexual.
- George Hounslow (Black Notebook): Worked on roads.
- Maryrose (Black Notebook): Paul and George's love interest, born in Southern Rhodesia
- Mr Boothby (Black Notebook): Proprietor of the Mashopi Hotel
- Mrs Boothby (Black Notebook): Proprietor of the Mashopi Hotel
- June Boothby (Black Notebook): Daughter of Mr & Mrs Boothby
- Jackson (Black Notebook): Cook at the Mashopi Hotel. Friend of Jimmy.
- Marie (Black Notebook): Jackson's wife. Has an affair with George.
- Ella (Yellow Notebook): Based on Anna Wulf. Writes for a women's magazine.
- Julia (Yellow Notebook): Based on Molly Jacobs
- Dr West (Yellow Notebook): Writes a medical column under the name Dr Allsop for the women's magazine.
- Patricia Brent (Yellow Notebook): Editor
- George (Yellow Notebook): Based on Max Wulf
- Paul Tanner (Yellow Notebook): Ella's lover
- Michael (Yellow Notebook): Ella's son
- Saul Green (Blue and Golden Notebooks): American writer (Clancy Sigal, in real life)
- Milt (Free Women 5): American writer (= Saul Green from the Blue and Golden Notebooks)
- Mother Sugar (Mrs Marks): Anna and Molly's psychoanalyst
- Tom Mathlong (Free Women): African political activist
- Charlie Themba (Free Women 4): Trade union leader, friend of Tom Mathlong

== Translations ==
Translations include:

- Le Carnet d'or , trans. by Marianne Véron (éditions Albin Michel, 1976) ISBN 978-2070298327 [French].
- Il taccuino d'oro trans. by Marialivia Serini (Feltrinelli, 1989) ISBN 88-07-80784-X [Italian].
- Den femte sanningen, trans. by Mårten Edlund (1964) [Swedish].
- Az arany jegyzetfüzet, trans. by Tábori Zoltán (Ulpius-ház, 2008), ISBN 978-963-254-210-2 [Hungarian].
- מחברת הזהב (Am Oved, 1978), ISBN 978-2-226-00340-9, ISBN 978-0-7181-0970-7 [Hebrew].
- "Złoty notes", trans. by Bohdan Maliborski (2014) ISBN 978-83-64142-79-6 [Polish].
- الدفتر الذهبي, trans. by Ayman Azab (2011) ISBN 977-62-63720 [Arabic].
