= Doris Lessing =

British novelist (1919–2013)

Doris Lessing CH OMG
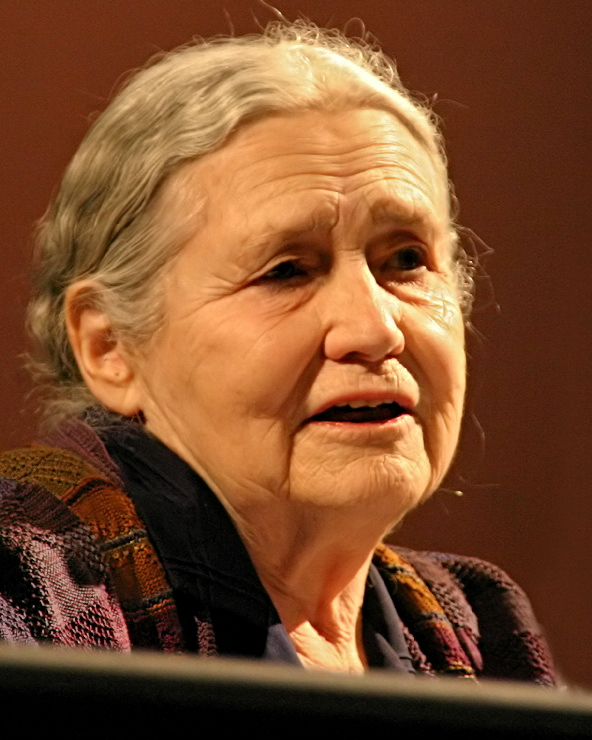
- Lessing in 2006
- Born: Doris May Tayler; 22 October 1919; Kermanshah, Qajar Iran
- Died: 17 November 2013 (aged 94); London, England
- Occupation: Writer
- Spouses: Frank Charles Wisdom (m. 1939; div. 1943) Gottfried Anton Nicolai Lessing (m. 1943; div. 1949)
- Children: John (1940–1992); Jean (b. 1941); Peter (1946–2013)
- Writing career
- Pen name: Jane Somers
- Period: 1950–2013
- Genres: Novel; short story; biography; drama; libretto; poetry
- Notable works: The Grass Is Singing; Children of Violence series; The Golden Notebook; Briefing for a Descent into Hell; The Good Terrorist
- Notable awards: Somerset Maugham Award 1954; Austrian State Prize for European Literature 1981; WH Smith Literary Award 1986; Grinzane Cavour Prize 1989; James Tait Black Memorial Prize 1995; David Cohen Prize 2001; Premio Príncipe de Asturias 2001; Nobel Prize in Literature 2007
- Movements: Modernism; postmodernism; Sufism; socialism; feminism; scepticism; science fiction
- Website: dorislessing.org

Doris May Lessing (née Tayler; 22 October 1919 – 17 November 2013) was a Rhodesian-British author and winner of the Nobel Prize in Literature in 2007. Lessing was born to British parents in Iran, where she lived until she was 6 in 1925. Her family then moved to Southern Rhodesia (now Zimbabwe), where she remained until moving to London, England, in 1949. Her novels include The Grass Is Singing (1950), the sequence of five novels collectively called Children of Violence (1952–1969), The Golden Notebook (1962), The Good Terrorist (1985), and five novels collectively known as Canopus in Argos: Archives (1979–1983).

Lessing was awarded the 2007 Nobel Prize in Literature. In awarding the prize, the Swedish Academy described her as "that epicist of the female experience, who with scepticism, fire and visionary power has subjected a divided civilisation to scrutiny". Lessing was the oldest person ever to receive the Nobel Prize in Literature, at age 87. In 2001, Lessing was awarded the David Cohen Prize for a lifetime's achievement in British literature. In 2008, The Times ranked her fifth on a list of "The 50 greatest British writers since 1945".

== Life ==
=== Early life ===
Lessing was born Doris May Tayler in Kermanshah, Iran, on 22 October 1919, to Captain Alfred Tayler and Emily Maude Tayler (née McVeagh), both British subjects. Her father, who had lost a leg during his service in World War I, met his future wife, a nurse, at the Royal Free Hospital in London where he was recovering from his amputation. The couple moved to Iran, for Alfred to take a job as a clerk for the Imperial Bank of Persia.

In 1925, the family moved to the British colony of Southern Rhodesia (now Zimbabwe) to farm maize and other crops on about 1,000 acres (400 ha) of bush that Alfred bought. In the rough environment, his wife Emily aspired to lead an Edwardian lifestyle. It might have been possible had the family been wealthy; in reality, they were short of money and the farm delivered very little income.

As a girl, Lessing was educated first at the Dominican Convent High School, a Roman Catholic convent all-girls school in the Southern Rhodesian capital of Salisbury (now Harare). Then followed a year at Girls High School in Salisbury. She left school at age 13 and was self-educated from then on. She left home at 15 and worked as a nursemaid. She started reading material that her employer gave her on politics and sociology and began writing around this time.

In 1937, Lessing moved to Salisbury to work as a telephone operator, and she soon married her first husband, civil servant Frank Wisdom, with whom she had two children (John, 1940–1992, and Jean, born in 1941), before the marriage ended in 1943. Lessing left the family home in 1943, leaving the two children with their father.

=== Move to London; political views ===
After the divorce, Lessing's interest was drawn to the community around the Left Book Club, an organisation she had joined the year before. It was here that she met her future second husband, Gottfried Lessing. They married shortly after she joined the group, and had a child together (Peter, 1946–2013), before they divorced in 1949. She did not marry again. Lessing also had a love affair with RAF serviceman John Whitehorn (brother of journalist Katharine Whitehorn), who was stationed in Southern Rhodesia, and wrote him ninety letters between 1943 and 1949.

Lessing moved to London in 1949 with her younger son, Peter, to pursue her writing career and socialist beliefs, but left the two older children with their father, Frank Wisdom. She later said that at the time she saw no choice: "For a long time I felt I had done a very brave thing. There is nothing more boring for an intelligent woman than to spend endless amounts of time with small children. I felt I wasn't the best person to bring them up. I would have ended up an alcoholic or a frustrated intellectual like my mother."

As well as campaigning against nuclear arms, she was an active opponent of apartheid, which led her to being banned from South Africa and Rhodesia in 1956 for many years. In the same year, following the Soviet invasion of Hungary, she left the Communist Party of Great Britain. In the 1980s, when Lessing was vocal in her opposition to Soviet actions in Afghanistan, she gave her views on feminism, communism and science fiction in an interview with The New York Times.

On 21 August 2015, a five-volume secret file on Lessing, built up by both MI5 and MI6, was made public and placed in The National Archives. The file, which contains documents that are redacted in parts, shows Lessing was under surveillance by MI5 and MI6 for around twenty years, from the early 1940s onwards. Her associations with communist organisations and political activism were reported to be the reasons for the surveillance of Lessing. Disaffected, and turning away from Marxist political philosophy, Lessing became increasingly absorbed with mystical and spiritual matters, devoting herself especially to the Sufi tradition.

=== Literary career ===
At the age of fifteen, Lessing began to sell her stories to magazines. Her first novel, The Grass Is Singing, was published in 1950. The work that gained her international attention, The Golden Notebook, was published in 1962. By the time of her death, she had published more than 50 novels, some under a pseudonym.

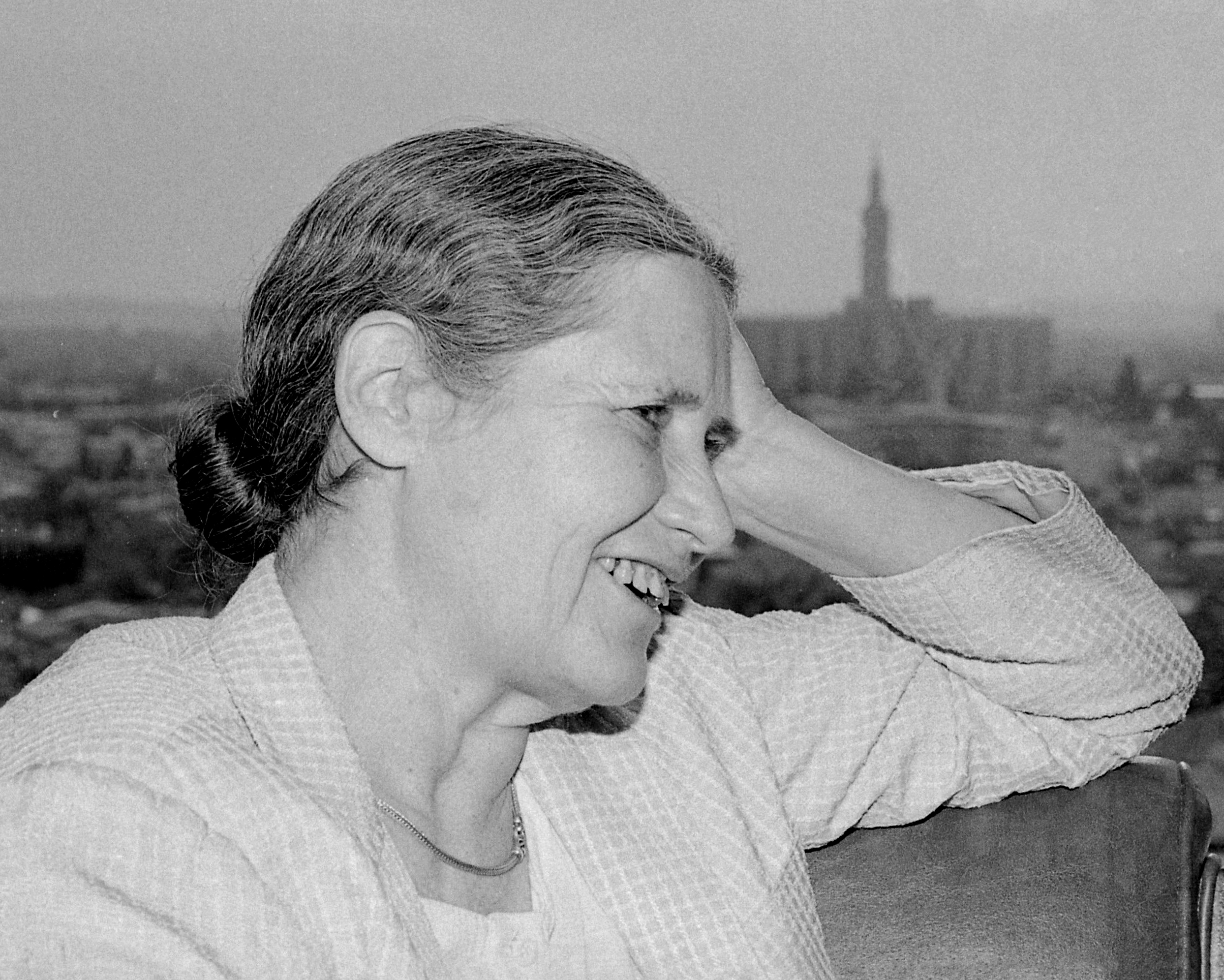
Lessing in 1984

In 1982, Lessing wrote two novels under the literary pseudonym Jane Somers to show the difficulty new authors face in trying to get their work printed. The novels were rejected by Lessing's UK publisher but later accepted by another English publisher, Michael Joseph, and in the US by Alfred A. Knopf. The Diary of a Good Neighbour was published in Britain and the US in 1983 and If the Old Could in both countries in 1984, both as written by Jane Somers. In 1984 both novels were republished in both countries (Viking Books publishing in the US), this time under one cover, with the title The Diaries of Jane Somers: The Diary of a Good Neighbour and If the Old Could, listing Doris Lessing as author.

Lessing declined a damehood (DBE) in 1992 as an honour linked to a non-existent Empire; she had previously declined appointment as an OBE in 1977. Later she accepted appointment as a Member of the Order of the Companions of Honour at the end of 1999 for "conspicuous national service". She was also made a Companion of Literature by the Royal Society of Literature.

In 2007, Lessing was awarded the Nobel Prize in Literature. She received the prize at the age of 88 years 52 days, making her the oldest winner of the literature prize at the time of the award and the third-oldest Nobel laureate in any category (after Leonid Hurwicz and Raymond Davis Jr.). Returning from the grocery store, Lessing was informed by a journalist of her win; she replied "Oh Christ" and continued to bring in her groceries, saying "One can't get more excited than one gets, you know?". While dismissing gathered reporters, she asked what they wanted to hear, saying "I'm sure you'd like some uplifting remarks of some kind." She was the eleventh woman to be awarded the Nobel Prize for Literature by the Swedish Academy in its 106-year history. In 2017, her Nobel medal was put up for auction. Previously, only one Nobel medal for literature had been sold at auction, for André Gide in 2016.

=== Illness and death ===
During the late 1990s, Lessing had a stroke, which stopped her from travelling during her later years. She was still able to attend the theatre and opera. She began to focus her mind on death, for example asking herself if she would have time to finish a new book. She died on 17 November 2013, aged 94, at her home in West Hampstead, London, of kidney failure, sepsis and a chest infection, predeceased by her two sons, but was survived by her daughter, Jean, who lives in South Africa. She was remembered with a humanist funeral service.

== Fiction ==
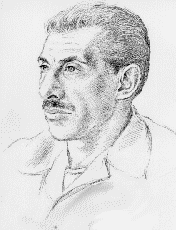
Idries Shah, who introduced Lessing to Sufism

Lessing's fiction is commonly divided into three distinct phases. During her Communist phase (1944–1956), she wrote radically about social issues, a theme to which she returned in The Good Terrorist (1985). Doris Lessing's first novel, The Grass Is Singing, as well as the short stories later collected in African Stories, are set in Southern Rhodesia (today Zimbabwe) where she was then living. This was followed by a psychological phase from 1956 to 1969, including the Golden Notebook and the "Children of Violence" quintet. Third came the Sufi phase, explored in her 70s work, and in the Canopus in Argos sequence of science fiction novels and novellas (or as she preferred to call it "space fiction", a description also preferred by C.S. Lewis for his works of science fiction) .

Lessing's Canopus sequence received a mixed reception from mainstream literary critics. John Leonard praised her 1980 novel The Marriages Between Zones Three, Four and Five in The New York Times, but in 1982 he wrote in reference to The Making of the Representative for Planet 8 that "[o]ne of the many sins for which the 20th century will be held accountable is that it has discouraged Mrs. Lessing... She now propagandises on behalf of our insignificance in the cosmic razzmatazz", to which Lessing replied: "What they didn't realise was that in science fiction is some of the best social fiction of our time. I also admire the classic sort of science fiction, like Blood Music, by Greg Bear. He's a great writer." She attended the 1987 World Science Fiction Convention as its Writer Guest of Honor. Here she made a speech in which she described her dystopian novel Memoirs of a Survivor as "an attempt at an autobiography".

The Canopus in Argos novels present an advanced interstellar society's efforts to accelerate the evolution of other worlds, including Earth. Using Sufi concepts, to which Lessing had been introduced in the mid-1960s by her "good friend and teacher" Idries Shah, the series of novels also uses an approach similar to that employed by the early 20th-century mystic G. I. Gurdjieff in his work All and Everything. Earlier works of "inner space" fiction like Briefing for a Descent into Hell (1971) and Memoirs of a Survivor (1974) also connect to this theme. Lessing's interest had turned to Sufism after coming to the realisation that Marxism ignored spiritual matters, leaving her disillusioned.

Lessing's novel The Golden Notebook is considered a feminist classic by some scholars, but notably not by the author herself, who later wrote that its theme of mental breakdowns as a means of healing and freeing one's self from illusions had been overlooked by critics. She also regretted that critics failed to appreciate the exceptional structure of the novel. She explained in Walking in the Shade that she modelled Molly partly on her good friend Joan Rodker, the daughter of the modernist poet and publisher John Rodker. Lessing did not like being pigeonholed as a feminist author. When asked why, she explained:

What the feminists want of me is something they haven't examined because it comes from religion. They want me to bear witness. What they would really like me to say is, 'Ha, sisters, I stand with you side by side in your struggle toward the golden dawn where all those beastly men are no more.' Do they really want people to make oversimplified statements about men and women? In fact, they do. I've come with great regret to this conclusion.

— Doris Lessing, The New York Times, 25 July 1982

== Doris Lessing Society ==
The Doris Lessing Society is dedicated to supporting the scholarly study of Lessing's work. The formal structure of the Society dates from January 1977, when the first issue of the Doris Lessing Newsletter was published. In 2002, the newsletter became the academic journal Doris Lessing Studies. The Society also organises panels at the Modern Languages Association (MLA) annual Conventions and has held two international conferences in New Orleans in 2004 and Leeds in 2007.

== Archives ==
Lessing's literary archive is held by the Harry Ransom Humanities Research Center, at the University of Texas at Austin. The 76 archival boxes of Lessing's materials at the Ransom Center contain nearly all of her extant manuscripts and typescripts up to 2008. Original material for Lessing's early books is assumed not to exist because she kept none of her early manuscripts. The McFarlin Library at the University of Tulsa holds a smaller collection.

The University of East Anglia's British Archive for Contemporary Writing holds Lessing's personal archive: a vast collection of professional and personal correspondence, including the Whitehorn letters, a collection of love letters from the 1940s, written when Lessing was still living in Southern Rhodesia (now Zimbabwe). The collection also includes forty years of personal diaries. Some of the archive remained embargoed during the writing of Lessing's official biography.

== Awards ==
- Somerset Maugham Award (1954)
- Prix Médicis étranger (1976)
- Austrian State Prize for European Literature (1981)
- Shakespeare Prize of the Alfred Toepfer Foundation, Hamburg (1982)
- WH Smith Literary Award (1986)
- Palermo Prize (1987)
- Premio Internazionale Mondello (1987)
- Grinzane Cavour Prize (1989)
- James Tait Black Memorial Prize for biography (1995)
- Los Angeles Times Book Prize (1995)
- Catalonia International Prize (1999)
- Member of the Order of the Companions of Honour (1999)
- Companion of Literature of the Royal Society of Literature (2000)
- David Cohen Prize (2001)
- Premio Príncipe de Asturias (2001)
- S.T. Dupont Golden PEN Award (2002)
- Nobel Prize in Literature (2007)
- Order of Mapungubwe: Category II Gold (2008)

== Publications ==
=== Novels ===
- The Grass Is Singing (1950) (filmed as Killing Heat (1981))
- Retreat to Innocence (1956)
- The Golden Notebook (1962)
- Briefing for a Descent into Hell (1971)
- The Summer Before the Dark (1973)
- The Memoirs of a Survivor (1974)
- The Diary of a Good Neighbour (as Jane Somers, 1983)
- If the Old Could... (as Jane Somers, 1984)
- The Good Terrorist (1985)
- The Fifth Child (1988)
- Love, Again (1996)
- Mara and Dann (1999)
- Ben, in the World (2000) – sequel to The Fifth Child
- The Sweetest Dream (2001)
- The Story of General Dann and Mara's Daughter, Griot and the Snow Dog (2005) – the sequel to Mara and Dann
- The Cleft (2007)

Children of Violence series (1952–1969)

- Martha Quest (1952)
- A Proper Marriage (1954)
- A Ripple from the Storm (1958)
- Landlocked (1965)
- The Four-Gated City (1969)

Canopus in Argos: Archives series (1979–1983)

- Shikasta (1979)
- The Marriages Between Zones Three, Four and Five (1980)
- The Sirian Experiments (1980)
- The Making of the Representative for Planet 8 (1982)
- The Sentimental Agents in the Volyen Empire (1983)

=== Opera libretti ===
- The Making of the Representative for Planet 8 (music by Philip Glass, 1986)
- The Marriages Between Zones Three, Four and Five (music by Philip Glass, 1997)

=== Comics ===
- Playing the Game (graphic novel illustrated by Charlie Adlard, 1995)

=== Drama ===
- Each His Own Wilderness (three plays, 1959)
- Play with a Tiger (1962)

=== Poetry collections ===
- Fourteen Poems (1959)
- The Wolf People – INPOPA Anthology 2002 (poems by Lessing, Robert Twigger and T.H. Benson, 2002)

=== Short story collections ===
- This Was the Old Chief's Country (1951)
- Five Short Novels (1953)
- The Habit of Loving (1957) (including the story Through the Tunnel (1955))
- A Man and Two Women (1963)
- African Stories (1964) (including the story The Black Madonna (1957))
- Winter in July (1966)
- The Story of a Non-Marrying Man (1972)
- This Was the Old Chief's Country: Collected African Stories, Vol. 1 (1973)
- The Sun Between Their Feet: Collected African Stories, Vol. 2 (1973)
- To Room Nineteen: Collected Stories, Vol. 1 (1978)
- The Temptation of Jack Orkney: Collected Stories, Vol. 2 (1978)
- Stories (1978)
- London Observed: Stories and Sketches (1992)
- The Real Thing: Stories and Sketches (1992)
- Spies I Have Known (1995)
- The Pit (1996)
- The Grandmothers: Four Short Novels (2003) (filmed as Two Mothers)

Cat Tales

- Particularly Cats (stories and nonfiction, 1967)
- Particularly Cats and Rufus the Survivor (stories and nonfiction, 1993)
- The Old Age of El Magnifico (stories and nonfiction, 2000)
- On Cats (2002) – omnibus edition containing the above three books

=== Autobiography and memoirs ===
- Going Home (memoir, 1957)
- African Laughter: Four Visits to Zimbabwe (memoir, 1992)
- Under My Skin: Volume One of My Autobiography, to 1949 (1994)
- Walking in the Shade: Volume Two of My Autobiography, 1949 to 1962 (1997)
- Alfred and Emily (memoir/fiction hybrid, 2008)

=== Other non-fiction ===
- In Pursuit of the English (1960)
- Prisons We Choose to Live Inside (essays, 1987)
- The Wind Blows Away Our Words (1987)
- A Small Personal Voice (essays, 1994)
- Conversations (interviews, edited by Earl G. Ingersoll, 1994)
- Putting the Questions Differently (interviews, edited by Earl G. Ingersoll, 1996)
- Time Bites: Views and Reviews (essays, 2004)
- On Not Winning the Nobel Prize (Nobel Lecture, 2007, published 2008)

== See also ==
- List of female Nobel laureates
- Declining a British honour
