= Dancing at the Edge of the World =

Book by Ursula K. Le Guin

- Cover of the first edition hardback
- Author: Ursula K. Le Guin
- Language: English
- Publisher: Grove Press (hardback)
- Publication date: 1989
- Publication place: United States
- Media type: book
- OCLC: 17917308

Dancing at the Edge of the World is a 1989 nonfiction collection by Ursula K. Le Guin.

The collection is divided into two categories: talks and essays, and book and movie reviews. Within each category, the works are organized chronologically; they are further marked by what Le Guin calls the Guide Ursuline—a system of symbols denoting the main themes of the works. The four themes with which she categorizes the essays are feminism (♀), social responsibility (○), literature (□) and travel (→).

== Contents ==
=== Talks and Essays ===
- 1976: "The Space Crone" ♀, ○
- 1976: "Is Gender Necessary? Redux" □, ♀
- 1978: "Moral and Ethical Implications of Family Planning" ♀, ○
- 1979: "It Was a Dark and Stormy Night" □
- 1979: "Working on 'The Lathe'" □
- 1980: "Some Thoughts on Narrative" □
- 1981: "World-Making" □
- 1981: "Hunger" ○
- 1981: "Places Names" →
- 1982: "The Princess" ○, ♀
- 1982: "A Non-Euclidean View of California as a Cold Place to Be" □
- 1982: "Facing It" ○
- 1983: "Reciprocity of Prose and Poetry" □
- 1983: "A Left-Handed Commencement Address" ♀, ○
- 1983: "Along the Platte" →
- 1984: "Whose Lathe?" □, ○
- 1984: "The Woman Without Answers" □
- 1984: "The Second Report of the Shipwrecked Foreigner to the Kadanh of Derb" ○
- 1985: "Room 9, Car 1430" →
- 1985: "Theodora" □
- 1985: "Science Fiction and the Future" □, ○
- 1985: "The Only Good Author?" □
- 1986: "Bryn Mawr Commencement Address" ♀, ○
- 1986: "Woman / Wilderness" ♀, ○
- 1986: "The Carrier Bag Theory of Fiction" ♀, □
- 1986: "Heroes" □, ♀
- 1986: "Prospects for Women in Writing" ♀
- 1986: "Text, Silence, Performance" □
- 1987: "'Who is Responsible?'" □
- 1987: "Conflict" □
- 1987: "'Where Do You Get Your Ideas From?'" □
- 1988: "Over the Hills and a Great Way Off" →
- 1988: "The Fisherwoman's Daughter" ♀, □

=== Reviews ===
- 1977: "The Dark Tower, by C. S. Lewis"
- 1978: "Close Encounters, Star Wars, and the Tertium Quid"
- 1979: "Shikasta, by Doris Lessing"
- 1980: "Two from "Venom""
- 1980: "Freddy's Book and Vlemk, by John Gardner"
- 1980: "The Marriages Between Zones Three, Four and Five, by Doris Lessing"
- 1980: "Kalila and Dimna, retold by Ramsay Wood"
- 1980: "Unfinished Business, by Maggie Scarf"
- 1980: "Italian Folktales, by Italo Calvino"
- 1981: "Peake's Progress, by Mervyn Peake"
- 1983: "The Sentimental Agents, by Doris Lessing"
- 1984: "Difficult Loves, by Italo Calvino"
- 1984: ""Forsaking Kingdoms": Five Poets"
- 1985: "The Mythology of North America, by John Bierhorst"
- 1986: "Silent Partners, by Eugene Linden"
- 1986: "Outside the Gates, by Molly Gloss"
- 1986: "Golden Days, by Carolyn See"

== Awards and honors ==
The book was a finalist for the 1990 Hugo Award for Best Non-Fiction Book.
