= The Making of the Representative for Planet 8 =

The Making of the Representative for Planet 8 may refer to:

- The Making of the Representative for Planet 8 (novel), a 1982 science fiction novel by Doris Lessing
- The Making of the Representative for Planet 8 (opera), a 1988 opera by Philip Glass with a libretto by Doris Lessing based on her novel
