= Mickelsson's Ghosts =

1982 novel by John Gardner

- Book jacket 1st edition hardcover
- Author: John Gardner
- Illustrator: (w/photographs) Joel Gardner
- Genre: Fiction
- Publisher: Alfred A. Knopf
- Publication date: 1982
- Pages: 590
- ISBN: 9780394504681
- OCLC: 7976018

Mickelsson's Ghosts, published in 1982, is American writer John Gardner's ninth novel. It was the final novel published during Gardner’s lifetime.

== Synopsis ==
On the “Acknowledgments” page of the novel, Gardner says that the town of Susquehanna, Pennsylvania is the “fictionalized setting of most of this novel’s action.” The main protagonist is Peter Mickelsson, at onetime “a frequently written about football player,” but now a Professor of Philosophy at Binghamton University. Mickelsson is driven, opinionated, probably a drunk, definitely bankrupt, and perhaps is losing his sanity.

During his personal descent into some kind of madness or dark night of the soul, which he seems powerless to stop, Mickelsson buys a farmhouse in northern Pennsylvania's Endless Mountains. Purportedly, it was once owned by Joseph Smith, founder of the Mormon religion. The farmhouse seems to be haunted by the ghosts of an incestuous family.

Meanwhile, the self-destructive Mickelsson has several affairs including one with Donnie, a young teenage prostitute who becomes pregnant; and another affair with a fellow faculty member who attempts to help him put his life back together. Mickelsson also inadvertently causes a death, and becomes involved with a sectarian religious group which may be in Mickelsson's imagination.

The ghosts of the title refer not just to individuals, but types. Although traditional ghost stories stick to one of three different kinds of ghosts, Gardner uniquely populates this novel with all three: real supernatural entities, "psychological" ghosts that originate in the imaginings of a character, and supernatural-seeming occurrences that have natural explanations. Although Mickelsson seems irredeemable, evident throughout is Gardner's sympathy toward all his characters however dissipated.

== Reception ==
At the time of its publication in 1982, many reviews of Mickelsson's Ghosts expressed “disapproval,” and were “tepid, if not harsh,” as Gardner’s biographer Barry Silesky has noted. For example, Kirkus Reviews called the book "a fascinating, oddly depressing failure".

There were even two opposing views of the novel that appeared in the same publication. In the New York Times book critic Benjamin DeMott disliked the novel, whereas critic Anatole Broyard deemed it an enjoyable success. DeMott thought that Gardner was unable to pull off the task and the standard he himself had set with his previous work, especially Nickel Mountain.

DeMott also believed that Gardner was unable to tie together the various threads of the novel’s plot into (simultaneously) a campus novel, a philosophical novel, and a mystery tale:

“the marriage of philosophy and mystery doesn't come off, largely, I think, because as Gardner thickens his plot he thins out his voice. The Mormon line of narrative in Mickelsson's Ghosts brings with it a termitelike infestation of crime-story cliche. The novelist's voice grows duller and flatter -loses variousness and flexibility.”

On the other hand, Broyard said there were many different ways of enjoying the novel:

“Mr. Gardner is an old-fashioned novelist in the best sense - he gives you more people, places, problems and ideas to think about than you can possibly deal with. It's as if the world had suddenly become unbearably vivid again, after all our disillusionment and irony.”

Since the initial “mixed” and “tepid” reception of Mickelsson's Ghosts in the early 1980s, the novel has slowly gained in stature, and now is viewed as one of Gardner’s important novelistic achievements. Significantly, New Directions Publishing reissued the book in 2008.

== Bibliography ==
- Mickelsson's Ghosts. Alfred A. Knopf. 1982. ISBN 978-0-394-50468-1.; reprint New Directions Publishing, 2008, ISBN 978-0-8112-1679-1
