= Another Chicago Magazine =

American magazine

- Editor: S.L. Wisenberg
- Categories: Literary magazine
- First issue: 1977
- Country: United States
- Based in: Chicago, Illinois
- Website: anotherchicagomagazine.net
- ISSN: 0272-4359
- OCLC: 1295765695

Another Chicago Magazine is an American magazine established by Left Field Press, in 1977. Contributors include David Sedaris, Charles Bukowski, Samantha Irby, Ander Monson, Shelley Jackson, Charles Harper Webb, Maxine Chernoff, Kim Addonizio, Sterling Plumpp, Robin Hemley, David Trinidad, Kathleen Rooney, Kathy Acker, Eve Ewing, and other writers. The magazine published a chapter from Mira Bartók's The Memory Palace before her best-selling memoir was published. In addition to fiction, nonfiction, drama, poetry, and art, the magazine has published interviews with Allen Ginsberg, Daisy Zamora, Grace Paley, Aleksandar Hemon, Donald Ray Pollock, Carlos Fuentes and other figures. Over the years, editors have included Simone Muench, Barry Silesky, and Sharon Solwitz. The magazine has also received awards and grants from the National Endowment for the Arts and the Illinois Arts Council. In 2020, David L. Ulin's essay, "Bed," was republished in The Best American Essays edited by André Aciman.

== See also ==
- List of literary magazines
