= Barry Silesky =

American poet, biographer, and writer

Barry Silesky (born 1949) is a Minneapolis-native poet, biographer, and non-fiction writer. He moved to Chicago where he studied for a BA from Northwestern University and an MA from the University of Illinois.

== Writing career ==
Silesky is the author of a collection of poetry, biographies, and prose, such as The New Tenants, One Thing That Can Save Us, This Disease: Poems, Ferlinghetti: The Artist in His Time, and John Gardner, Literary Outlaw. He was the founding editor of ACM (Another Chicago Magazine) and previously taught at the Art Institute of Chicago and Loyola University Chicago. Silesky’s works are widely held in libraries worldwide.
