= Batavia, New York =

City in the United States

Batavia Seneca: Ji:nyödahsesgeh
- City
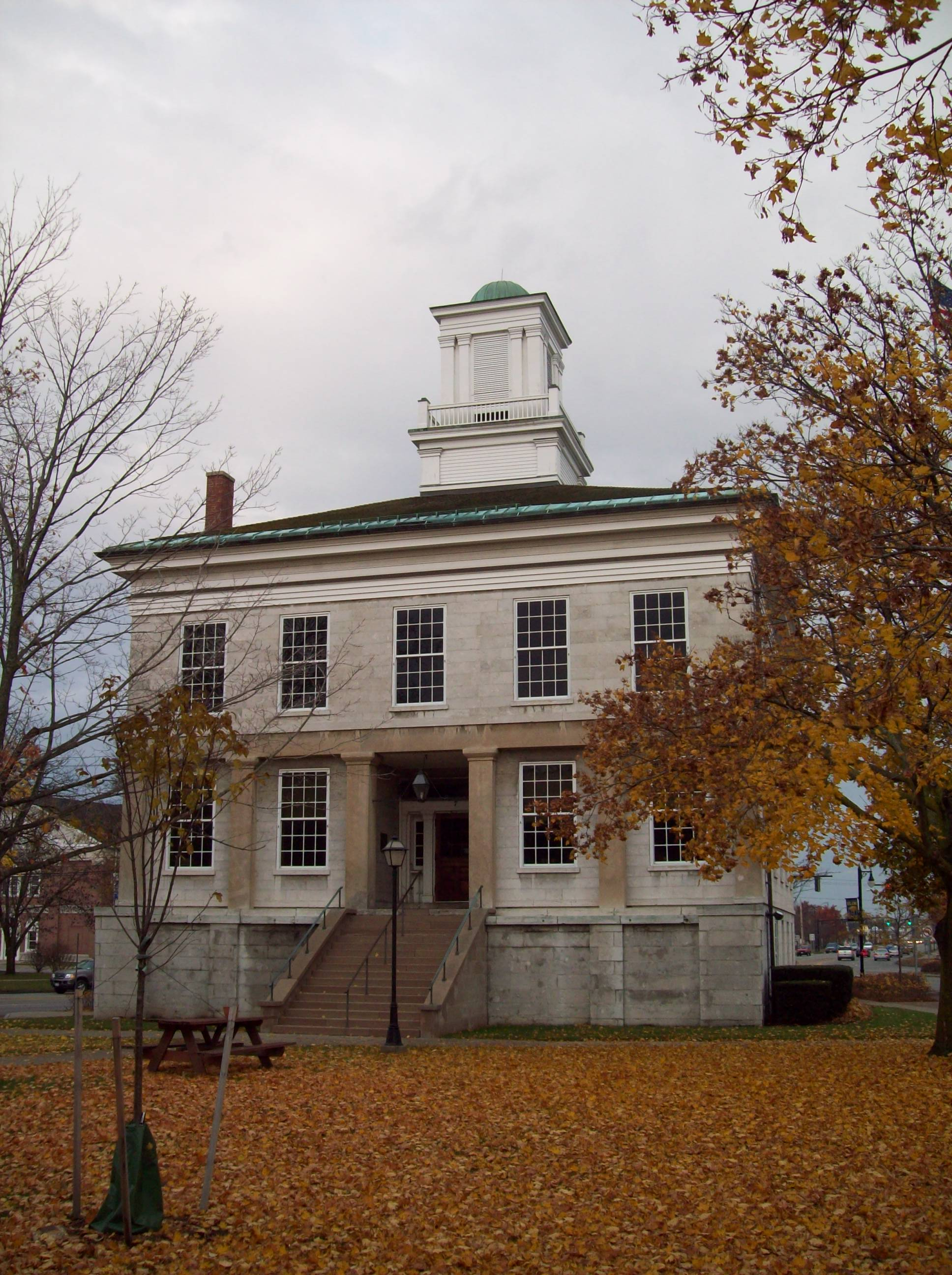
- Genesee County Courthouse

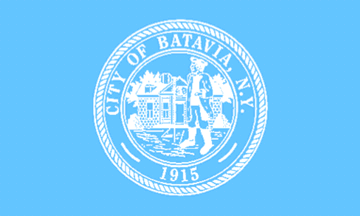
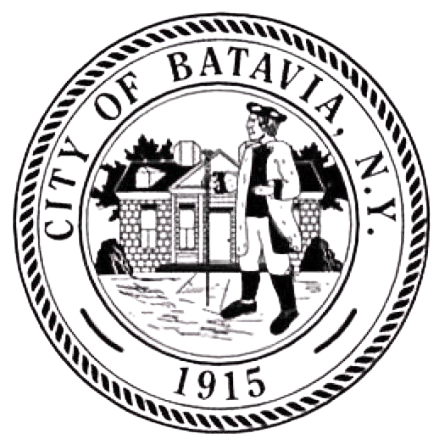
- Flag Seal
- Nickname: 1802 Birthplace of Western New York
- Motto: “The Right Place. The Right Time.”
- Location within Genesee County and New York

- Location in the United States of America Batavia (the United States)
- Coordinates: 42°59′55″N 78°11′3″W
- Country: United States
- State: New York
- County: Genesee
- Founded (village): 1802; 224 years ago
- Incorporated (village): 1823; 203 years ago
- Named for: Batavia, Netherlands

Government
  - Type: Council-Manager
  - City Council: Members' List: At-Large Members: • Marianne Clattenburg (R) Pres.; • Timothy E. Buckley (R); • Frank Ferrando (R); • W1: William Cox (C); • W2: Patti Pacino (R); • W3: Samuel Barone (D); • W4: Robert Bialkowski (R); • W5: Kathy Briggs (D); • W6: Rose Mary Christian (D)

Area
  - Total: 5.28 sq mi (13.67 km^{2})
  - Land: 5.20 sq mi (13.46 km^{2})
  - Water: 0.081 sq mi (0.21 km^{2}) 1.14%
- Elevation: 892 ft (272 m)

Population (2020)
  - Total: 15,600
  - Density: 3,002.7/sq mi (1,159.33/km^{2})
- Demonym: Batavian
- Time zone: UTC−5 (EST)
  - Summer (DST): UTC−4 (EDT)
- ZIP Code: 14020
- Area code: 585
- FIPS code: 36-04715
- GNIS feature ID: 0943150
- Website: Batavia NY

Batavia (Seneca: Ji:nyödahsesgeh ) is a city in and the county seat of Genesee County, New York, United States. It is located near the center of the county, surrounded by the Town of Batavia, which is a separate municipality. Batavia's population, as of the 2020 census, was 15,600. It is considered to be part of the Rochester–Batavia–Seneca Falls combined statistical area. Its name comes from the Batavian Republic (1795–1806), a republican government of the Netherlands and home of the investors of the Holland Land Company. In 2006, a national magazine, Site Selection, ranked Batavia third among the nation's micropolitans, based on economic development. The New York State Thruway (Interstate 90) passes north of the city. Genesee County Airport (GVQ) is also north of the city.

The city hosts the Batavia Muckdogs baseball team, of the Perfect Game Collegiate Baseball League, at Dwyer Stadium, (299 Bank Street). The Muckdogs, formerly, were an affiliate of the Miami Marlins; in 2008, they won the New York Penn League Championship, and in 2026, won the Perfect Game Collegiate Baseball League championship.

== History ==
=== Holland Land Company ===
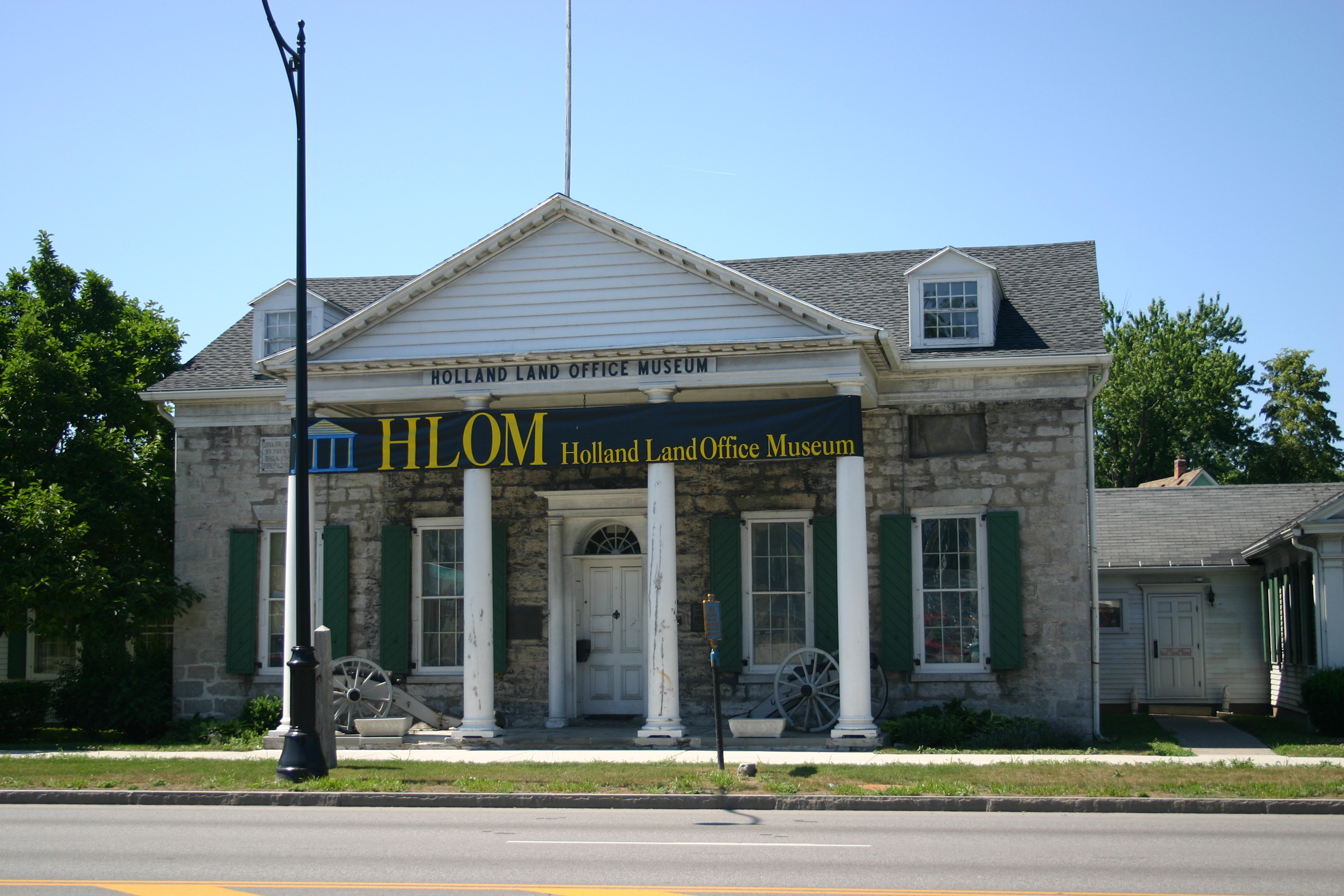
All of western New York was sold through this office of the Holland Land Company, which is now a museum.

The current City of Batavia was an early settlement in what is today called Genesee Country, the farthest western region of New York State, comprising the Genesee Valley and westward to the Niagara River, Lake Erie, and the Pennsylvania line. The tract purchased in western New York (the Holland Purchase) was a 3,250,000 acre (13,150 km^{2}) portion of the Phelps and Gorham Purchase that lay west of the Genesee River. It was purchased in December 1792, February 1793, and July 1793 from Robert Morris, a prominent Revolutionary banker, by the Holland Land Company, a consortium of Dutch bankers.

The village of Batavia was founded in 1802 by resident Land Agent Joseph Ellicott, under the authorization of Paul Busti of the Holland Land Company. Batavia, New York, was named by Busti in honor of the Batavian Republic (1795–1806), a republican government of the Netherlands and home of the investors of the Holland Land Company, itself derived from Batavia, a historic and geographic region dating to Roman times.

One of the provisions of the sale was that Morris needed to settle the Indian title to the land, so he arranged for his son, Thomas Morris, to negotiate with the Iroquois at Geneseo, New York, in 1797. About 3,000 Iroquois, mostly Senecas, arrived for the negotiation. Seneca chief and orator Red Jacket was adamantly against the sale, but his influence was thwarted by freely-distributed liquor and trinkets given to the women. He acquiesced and signed the Treaty of Big Tree, in which the tribe sold their rights to the land (except for a small portion) for $100,000. Mary Jemison, known as The White Woman of the Genesee, who was captured in a raid and ended up marrying her Seneca captor, was an able negotiator for the tribe and helped win them more favorable terms.

The land was then surveyed under the supervision of Joseph Ellicott, a monumental task and the biggest land survey ever attempted to that time. As an agent for the company, Ellicott, established a land office in Batavia in 1802. The entire purchase was named Genesee County in 1802, with Batavia as the county seat. The company sold off the purchase until 1846, when the company was dissolved. The phrase "doing a land office business," which denotes prosperity, dates from this era. The office is a museum today, designated a National Historic Landmark. Ellicott lived in Batavia for many years although he thought Buffalo would certainly grow to be larger. Batavia has a major street named after him (Ellicott Street) as well as a minor one (Ellicott Avenue), and a large monument in the heart of the city. Batavia was incorporated as a village in 1823.

The present counties of western New York were all laid-out from the original Genesee County; the modern Genesee County is but one of many. However, the entire area, as a region, is still referred to as Genesee Country. Thus, Batavia was the core from which the rest of western New York was opened for settlement and development.

=== Masonic Lodge scandal ===
A scandal erupted in Batavia in 1826, when William Morgan was offended by the local Masonic Lodge (Western Star Chapter R. A. M. No. 33 of Le Roy, New York), and threatened to expose the lodge's secrets. He was arrested on a minor charge, then released when his charge was paid, into the company of several men, with whom he went, apparently unwillingly. It was developed later that the men were Masons, and they carried him to Fort Niagara, where he was held captive and then disappeared. Although the Masons claimed he was only bribed to cease publication and leave the area forever, public sentiment was that he was murdered. No conviction was ever obtained. His captors were only charged and convicted with his abduction.

The event roused tremendous public furor and anti-Mason sentiment. Anti-Masonry was a factor in politics for many years afterward, leading to the creation of the Anti-Masonic Party, as well as religion. Many Methodist Episcopal clergy had joined the Masons, and this was one of the reasons the Free Methodist Church separated.

=== Erie Canal ===
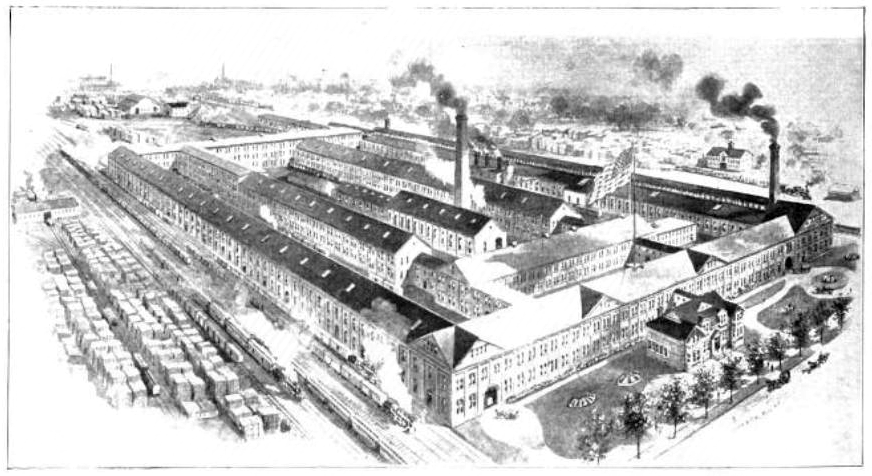
Johnston Harvester Company factory, c. 1900

The Erie Canal in 1825 bypassed Batavia, going well to the north at Albion and Medina, enabling Buffalo and Rochester to grow much faster. With the sale of the western part of the state completed, Batavia became a small industrial city in the heart of an agricultural area. It became known for the manufacture of tractors, agricultural implements, sprayers and shoes. It also was a tool and die making center for industries in other areas.

The largest manufacturer, Johnston Harvester Company came into being in 1868. In 1910, the business was acquired by Massey-Harris Co. Ltd, and became a subsidiary of that Canadian company, founded by Daniel Massey in 1847.

Batavia grew rapidly in the early 20th century, receiving an influx of Polish and Italian immigrants. The City of Batavia was incorporated in 1915.

=== Recent history ===
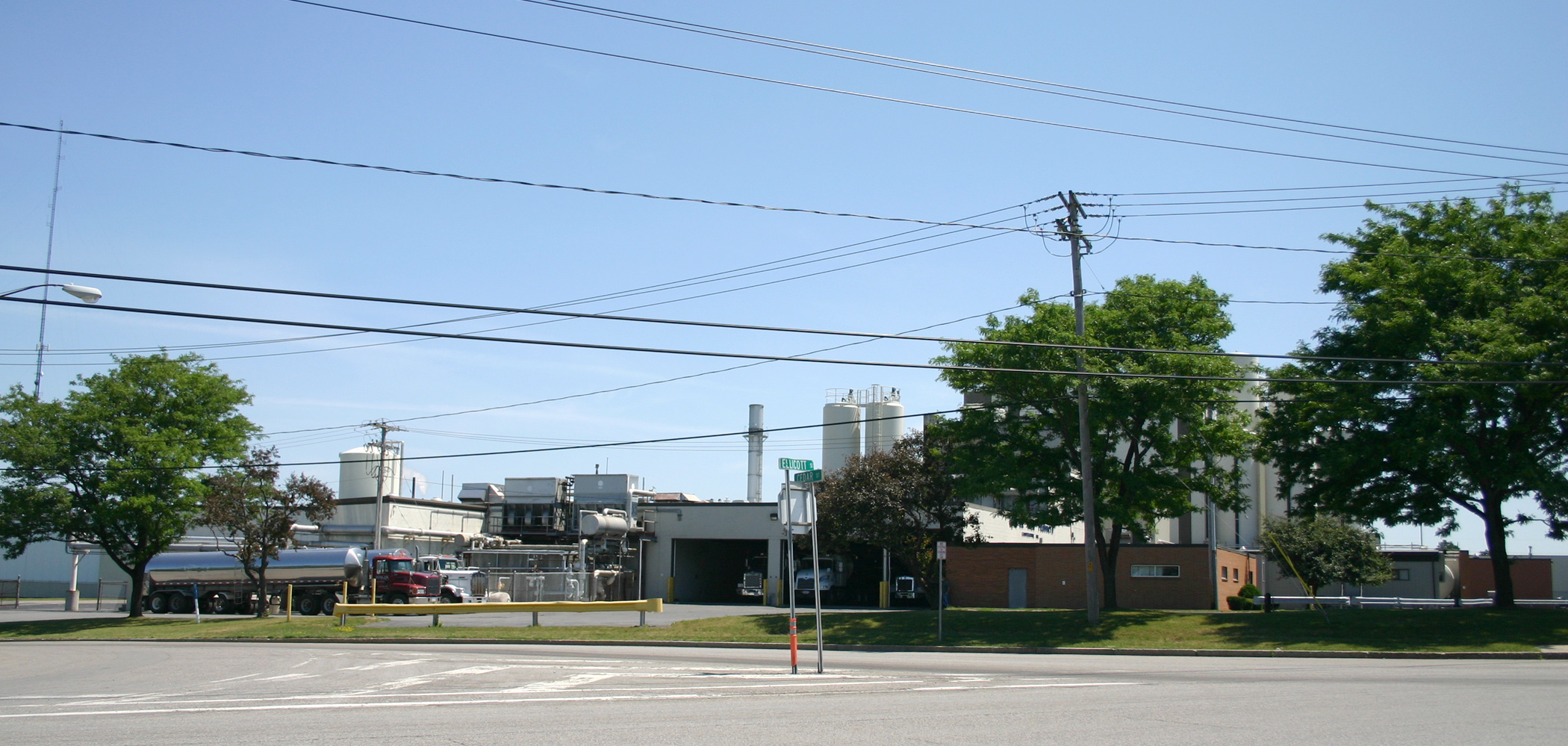
Oatka Milk plant still processes milk from area dairy farms which are fewer but larger in recent times

Batavia is part of what has become known as The Rust Belt. In recent years much of the heavier industry left for other areas of the US, or abroad, and according to U.S. Census data there has been a gradual but consistent decline in the city's population from 1960 forward.

The construction of the Buffalo Federal Detention Facility, a federal immigration detention center next to the airport has provided more jobs in the area, as well as expansion of the airport, including lengthening the runway to accommodate larger aircraft in 2005. Inmates at the detention center have included terrorism suspects, such as Nabil Ahmed Farag Soliman, who embarked on a hunger strike in 1999 after two and a half years in federal detention.

In August 2012, Muller Quaker Dairy broke ground on what was to be one of the largest yogurt manufacturing plants in the United States, and employed 170 people in December 2015. Muller Quaker Dairy is a joint venture between PepsiCo and the Theo Muller Group. On December 10, 2015, the closure of the yogurt plant was announced with the additional news that the facility would be sold to the Dairy Farmers of America cooperative.

== Geography and climate ==
=== Geography ===
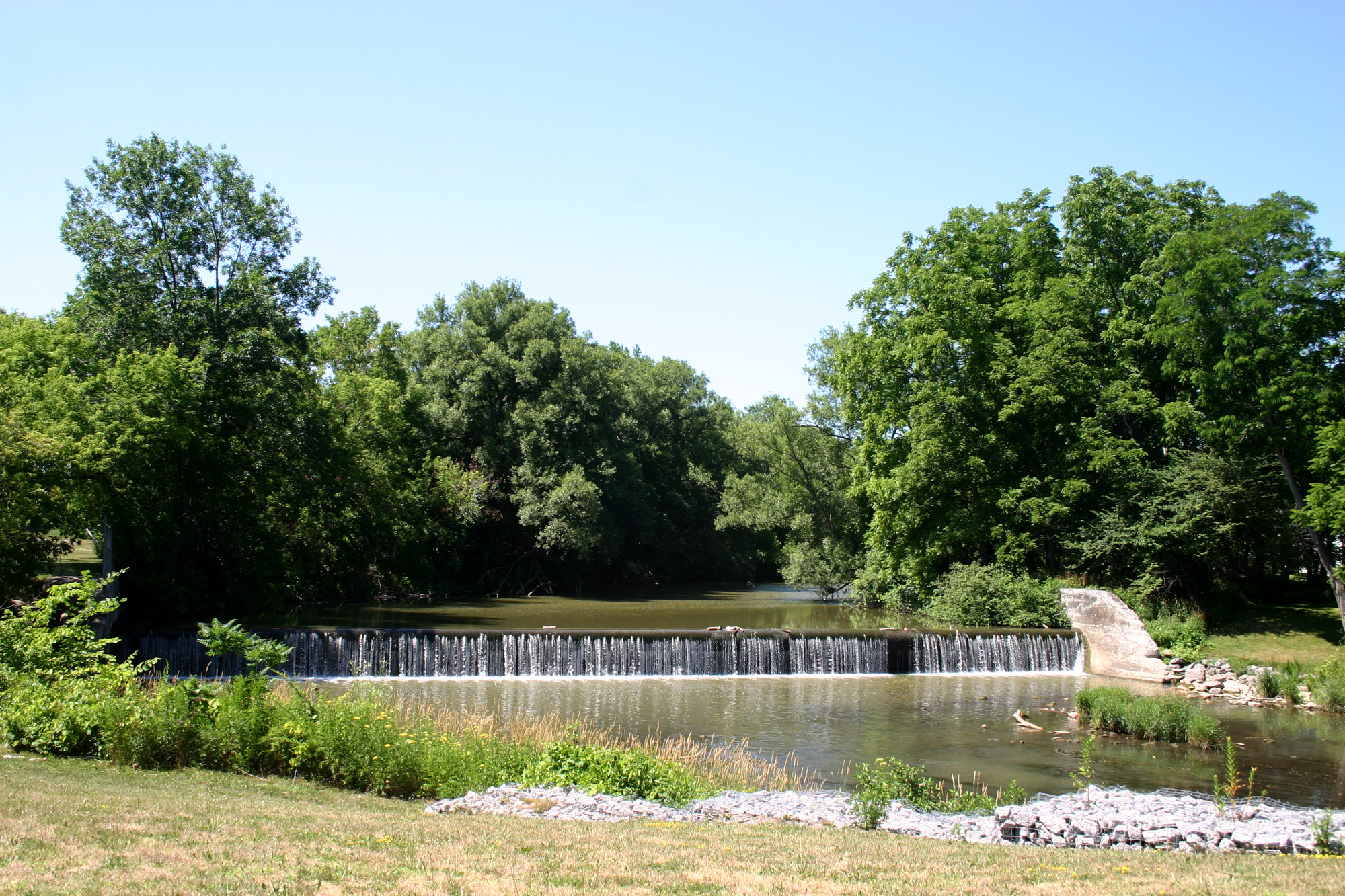
Old mill dam at the Big Bend of the Tonawanda, downtown Batavia, New York. The choice of this site for Ellicot's headquarters was probably influenced by a good mill site.

According to the United States Census Bureau, the city has an area of 5.2 square miles (13.6 km^{2}), of which 5.2 square miles (13.4 km^{2}) is land and 0.1 square mile (0.2 km^{2}) (1.14%) is water. The city also sits directly along the 43rd parallel north.

New York State Route 5 (east-west) intersects state routes 33, 63 and 98 in the city. The New York State Thruway (Interstate 90) is immediately north of Batavia.

=== Climate ===
This climatic region is typified by large seasonal temperature differences, with warm to hot (and often humid) summers and cold (sometimes severely cold) winters. According to the Köppen climate classification system, Batavia has a humid continental climate, abbreviated "Dfa" or "Dfb" on climate maps.

Climate data for Batavia, New York, 1991–2020 normals, extremes 1932–present
Month	Jan	Feb	Mar	Apr	May	Jun	Jul	Aug	Sep	Oct	Nov	Dec	Year
Record high °F (°C)	72 (22)	74 (23)	81 (27)	92 (33)	93 (34)	95 (35)	103 (39)	96 (36)	96 (36)	88 (31)	79 (26)	73 (23)	103 (39)
Mean maximum °F (°C)	56.5 (13.6)	54.5 (12.5)	65.7 (18.7)	78.4 (25.8)	85.1 (29.5)	88.3 (31.3)	89.8 (32.1)	88.0 (31.1)	85.9 (29.9)	78.1 (25.6)	68.1 (20.1)	57.5 (14.2)	91.0 (32.8)
Mean daily maximum °F (°C)	31.0 (−0.6)	33.1 (0.6)	42.4 (5.8)	55.7 (13.2)	67.9 (19.9)	76.4 (24.7)	80.0 (26.7)	78.5 (25.8)	72.4 (22.4)	60.0 (15.6)	47.6 (8.7)	36.2 (2.3)	56.8 (13.8)
Daily mean °F (°C)	23.4 (−4.8)	24.9 (−3.9)	33.4 (0.8)	45.3 (7.4)	57.3 (14.1)	66.3 (19.1)	70.4 (21.3)	68.9 (20.5)	62.4 (16.9)	50.9 (10.5)	39.7 (4.3)	29.3 (−1.5)	47.7 (8.7)
Mean daily minimum °F (°C)	15.8 (−9.0)	16.6 (−8.6)	24.3 (−4.3)	34.9 (1.6)	46.7 (8.2)	56.1 (13.4)	60.7 (15.9)	59.3 (15.2)	52.4 (11.3)	41.8 (5.4)	31.8 (−0.1)	22.3 (−5.4)	38.6 (3.6)
Mean minimum °F (°C)	−3.3 (−19.6)	−2.2 (−19.0)	6.3 (−14.3)	22.3 (−5.4)	33.9 (1.1)	44.0 (6.7)	50.4 (10.2)	48.9 (9.4)	39.7 (4.3)	29.1 (−1.6)	18.1 (−7.7)	4.8 (−15.1)	−7.2 (−21.8)
Record low °F (°C)	−24 (−31)	−28 (−33)	−15 (−26)	6 (−14)	24 (−4)	32 (0)	40 (4)	33 (1)	28 (−2)	19 (−7)	1 (−17)	−18 (−28)	−28 (−33)
Average precipitation inches (mm)	2.47 (63)	1.90 (48)	2.43 (62)	3.17 (81)	3.23 (82)	3.69 (94)	3.53 (90)	3.25 (83)	3.62 (92)	3.60 (91)	2.92 (74)	2.76 (70)	36.57 (930)
Average snowfall inches (cm)	23.0 (58)	18.6 (47)	11.4 (29)	1.7 (4.3)	0.0 (0.0)	0.0 (0.0)	0.0 (0.0)	0.0 (0.0)	0.0 (0.0)	0.4 (1.0)	5.8 (15)	13.0 (33)	73.9 (187.3)
Average extreme snow depth inches (cm)	8.2 (21)	9.8 (25)	8.5 (22)	1.3 (3.3)	0.0 (0.0)	0.0 (0.0)	0.0 (0.0)	0.0 (0.0)	0.0 (0.0)	0.3 (0.76)	3.6 (9.1)	9.1 (23)	15.9 (40)
Average precipitation days (≥ 0.01 in)	14.8	12.1	11.7	13.4	12.5	11.7	10.9	10.4	11.9	14.6	12.4	14.1	150.5
Average snowy days (≥ 0.1 in)	9.2	6.5	3.5	0.9	0.0	0.0	0.0	0.0	0.0	0.1	1.3	5.1	26.6
Source 1: NOAA
Source 2: National Weather Service

== Demographics ==
Historical population
Census	Pop.	Note	%±
1810	100		—
1830	1,671		—
1840	2,000		19.7%
1850	3,000		50.0%
1860	2,868		−4.4%
1870	3,890		35.6%
1880	4,845		24.6%
1890	7,221		49.0%
1900	9,180		27.1%
1910	11,613		26.5%
1920	13,541		16.6%
1930	17,375		28.3%
1940	17,267		−0.6%
1950	17,799		3.1%
1960	18,210		2.3%
1970	17,338		−4.8%
1980	16,703		−3.7%
1990	16,310		−2.4%
2000	16,256		−0.3%
2010	15,465		−4.9%
2020	15,600		0.9%
U.S. Decennial Census

=== 2020 census ===
As of the 2020 census, Batavia had a population of 15,600. The median age was 40.9 years. 19.8% of residents were under the age of 18 and 20.8% of residents were 65 years of age or older. For every 100 females there were 101.0 males, and for every 100 females age 18 and over there were 99.9 males age 18 and over.

99.6% of residents lived in urban areas, while 0.4% lived in rural areas.

There were 6,863 households in Batavia, of which 23.7% had children under the age of 18 living in them. Of all households, 31.6% were married-couple households, 24.5% were households with a male householder and no spouse or partner present, and 34.0% were households with a female householder and no spouse or partner present. About 40.0% of all households were made up of individuals and 17.0% had someone living alone who was 65 years of age or older.

There were 7,450 housing units, of which 7.9% were vacant. The homeowner vacancy rate was 0.9% and the rental vacancy rate was 8.9%.

Racial composition as of the 2020 census
Race	Number	Percent
White	12,779	81.9%
Black or African American	940	6.0%
American Indian and Alaska Native	56	0.4%
Asian	212	1.4%
Native Hawaiian and Other Pacific Islander	12	0.1%
Some other race	421	2.7%
Two or more races	1,180	7.6%
Hispanic or Latino (of any race)	946	6.1%

=== 2010 census ===
As of the 2010 census, there were 15,465 people, 6,644 households, and 3,710 families residing in the city. The city's racial demographic changed slightly from 2000 to 2010.

=== 2000 census ===
As of the 2000 census, there were 16,256 people, 6,457 households, and 3,867 families residing in the city. The population density was 3,133.9 people per square mile (1,210.0 people/km^{2}). There were 6,924 housing units at an average density of 1,334.8 per square mile (515.4/km^{2}). The city's racial makeup was 90.23% White, 5.43% Black or African American, 0.48% Native American, 0.87% Asian, 0.02% Pacific Islander, 1.06% from other races, and 1.90% from two or more races. Hispanic or Latino of any race were 2.45% of the population.

There were 6,457 households, of which 29.4% had children under the age of 18 living with them, 42.5% were married couples living together, 13.2% had a female householder with no husband present, and 40.1% were non-families. 33.7% of all households were made up of individuals, and 16.2% had someone living alone who was at least 65 years old. The average household size was 2.34 and the average family size was 3.01.

23.4% of the city's population were under the age of 18, 8.7% were from age 18 to 24, 29.0% were from age 25 to 44, 20.2% were from age 45 to 64, and 18.6% were age 65 or older. The median age was 38 years. For every 100 females, there were 93.2 males. For every 100 females age 18 and over, there were 92.2 males.

The city's median household income was $33,484, and the median family income was $42,460. Males had a median income of $32,091 versus $23,289 for females. The city's per capita income was $17,737. About 10.2% of families and 12.3% of the population were below the poverty line, including 16.5% of those under age 18 and 6.9% of those age 65 or over.

== Education ==
Batavia City School District is the school district of the city, and operates multiple public schools there, including Batavia High School.

Batavia is also where the New York State School for the Blind, a New York State-operated K-12 school, and the main campus of Genesee Community College is located.

== Notable events ==
- The first business incubator in the United States, the Batavia Industrial Center, was started in Batavia.
- In March 1926, over 1,000 people turned out to hear Helen Keller speak at what was then the high school.
- On September 3, 1993, a tornado tore through Batavia, killing two people.
- On the night of August 3, 1994, Amtrak's westbound Lake Shore Limited derailed near Batavia, and fourteen of the train's eighteen cars went off the tracks. There were no fatalities.
- Governor George Pataki made Batavia the New York State "Capital for A Day" on Wednesday, July 25, 2001.
- Batavia was used as a filming location for the 1987 comedy road film, Planes, Trains and Automobiles.

== Notable people ==
- Terry A. Anderson, journalist, held captive in Lebanon by Hezbollah partisans from 1985 to 1991
- Thom Beers, TV producer
- David Bellavia, Medal of Honor winning Iraq War veteran
- Albert Brisbane (1809–1890), socialist writer and newspaper publisher
- Charles H. Burke, former US Congressman from South Dakota
- Daniel Burling, former New York State Assemblyman
- Albert G. Burr, United States Representative
- Paul Busti (Paolo Busti) principal agent of the Holland Land Company
- William L. Carpenter, naturalist and geologist
- Trumbull Cary, former New York State Senator
- Ralph Chandler, former Rear Admiral of the United States Navy
- Ralph Chapin, contributor to Rochester Zen Center
- William Henry Comstock, businessman and politician
- Barber Conable, political leader and World Bank president, was a former resident.
- James Crossen Jr. (1826–1890), founder of James Crossen-Cobourg Car Works, a railway car and streetcar builder
- Albert G. Dow, former New York State Senator
- Benjamin Ellicott, former US Congressman
- David Ellicott Evans, former US Congressman
- Marc Ferrari, guitar player for the band Keel
- John Fisher, former industrialist and US congressman from New York
- Teal Fowler, ice hockey player
- John Gardner, novelist, literary critic, and university professor
- Augustus Hall, former US Congressman from Iowa, Chief Justice of Nebraska Territory
- Robert Haney, Wisconsin politician and businessman
- Stephen Hawley, New York State Assemblyman
- Ronald E. Hermance Jr., former financial executive
- David C. Johnson, composer
- Bill Kauffman, political journalist and author
- Kas Kastner, racing driver, racing engineer, sailor and author
- George W. Lay, former US Congressman
- Samuel D. Lockwood, former Illinois Attorney General, Secretary of State, Supreme Court Justice
- Thomas C. Love, former US Congressman
- Vincent Maney, former MLB player
- Krista Marie, Member of the country band, The Farm
- Paula Miller, former member of Virginia House of Delegates
- William Morgan, his book on Freemasonry and his disappearance in 1826 sparked an anti-Masonic movement in America
- Thomas David Morrison, Canadian doctor and exiled Mayor of Toronto 1838–1843
- James C. Owens Jr., naval aviator
- Dean Richmond, from 1864 to 1866, president of the New York Central
- Julian Sidney Rumsey (1823–1886), served as the 22nd Mayor of Chicago during the American Civil War from 1861 to 1862.
- Albert Smith, former US Congressman
- Jeff Taylor, Nashville-based bandleader and multi-instrumentalist
- Phineas L. Tracy, former US Congressman
- J. C. Tretter, NFL Player
- Emory Upton, United States Army General during the Civil War
- Seth Wakeman, former US Congressman
- Isaac Wilson, former US Congressman
- Mary Elizabeth Wood, Librarian and missionary
- Edward J. York, United States Air Force colonel and participant of the Doolittle Raid on Japan in World War II

== In popular culture ==
- Author John Gardner, a Batavia native, set his novels The Resurrection (1966) and The Sunlight Dialogues (1972) in 1960s Batavia.
- Native Batavian Bill Kauffman, a political writer and columnist, has a book, Dispatches from the Muckdog Gazette (2002), about the city. Author F. Scott Fitzgerald references Batavia in his novel, Tender Is the Night (1934)
- Popular authors Stephen King and Peter Straub mention or set parts of their novel, The Talisman (1983), in the city.
- Batavia was also referenced in The Simpsons Season 8 episode "The Twisted World of Marge Simpson", when the first order to Marge's pretzel business after securing the protection of the local mafia comes from the Meat Packers Union Hall in Batavia.
- Batavia's minor league baseball team is referenced in the 2001 major motion picture “Summer Catch,” which stars Jessica Biel.

== Environmental Risk Assessment ==
=== Toxics Release Inventory ===
In Batavia, there are multiple companies ranging from food products to manufacturing that release toxic chemicals on a regular basis. The following data comes from the United States Environmental Protection Agency’s Toxics Release Inventory (TRI) database. In 2020, these facilities were responsible for 1,522,366 pounds of waste. Of this number, a total of 53,610 pounds was released on land, or into the air and water of the surrounding areas without being managed properly. These oversights in waste management can cause toxic chemicals to leech into the surrounding environment and become toxic to the individuals living there. Of these facilities, 4 are indicated by the EPA to release chemicals that could pose a threat to people in the surrounding communities. The risk indication comes from an RSEI score higher than zero, which signifies a possibility of harm and contamination. These companies include the following:

- Graham Corporation
- HP Hood LLC
- Chapin International
- US Chrome Corporation of New York

In total, these companies accounted for 29,724 pounds of the 53,610 pounds of contaminants released in Batavia in 2020, totaling 55.44% of the year's chemical releases. The top 5 contaminants by weight that caused an elevated RSEI score in 2020 are as follows:

- Chromium (18 lb)
- Nickel (44 lb)
- Peracetic acid (1,318 lb)
- Manganese (12 lb)
- Lead (380 lb)

If consumed in toxic amounts, either rapidly or slowly over time, these chemicals can cause a multitude of negative health effects in residents surrounding these facilities. Among this list, nickel compounds have been found to be associated with cancer, hematological, immunological, and respiratory complications, manganese has been linked to neurological complications, and lead has been linked to cancer, cardiovascular, developmental, hematological, neurological, renal, and reproductive complications. This is just a short list of all of the possible risks of exposure so independent research is recommended. The very presence of these compounds in released materials does not directly correlate with human ingestion, and that there are many safety measures in place to ensure that this is the case.

=== Affected Demographics ===
Each facility listed above is located inside or on the outer boundary of residential areas. In these areas, the population density of lower-income residents, as well as residents of color, is higher than in the areas that do not contain any facilities that potentially toxic chemicals. This trend seemingly holds true in most urban areas. As stated before, the placement of these facilities can have a large impact on the individuals who surround them. Throughout the United States, people of color and people living in impoverished conditions are more likely to live in areas hosting facilities that release toxic chemicals. This disparity accounts for a large difference in the health outcomes of the people in these neighborhoods, including increased asthma rates in children of color compared to their white counterparts, and many other adverse effects.

== See also ==
- Batavia (town), New York
- Holland Land Office
- Batavia Traction Company
