= Batavia Traction Company =

Streetcar railway in New York

The Batavia Traction Company was an electric streetcar railway that served the city of Batavia, New York. The tracks were intended to be part of a larger system connecting Buffalo and Rochester. Built by the Buffalo and Williamsville Electric Railway, the 2.3-mile line opened for business in 1903. The Buffalo, Batavia & Electric Railway Co. was chartered October 3, 1904. The road was intended to connect with Buffalo, Williamsville and Rochester. As of 1911 the line was projected to be 65 miles and 850 feet of rail had been laid. The line was sold to the Batavia Traction Company in 1914. In 1914, the Batavia Traction Company was given permission to construct a double track standard gauge electric street car along the portions of Main street that were paved with brick from Bank street to West Main street and a single track from the end of the brick paving on West Main street to the western boundary of the village and on East Main street from the end of the brick paving to the intersection of Bryon Road and along Bryon Road to the eastern boundary of the village. Struggling for many years, the line finally shut down on June 12, 1927.
