= New York State School for the Blind =

K-12 school for blind students in Batavia, New York

Coordinates: 43°0′23″N 78°11′6″W

New York State School for the Blind (NYSSB, Braille: ⠝⠽⠎⠎⠃) is a public boarding K–12 school for blind students in Batavia, New York. It is operated by the State of New York.

It was established from a bill passed into law by the New York State Legislature on April 27, 1865. Construction began in February 1866 and the building began operations on September 2, 1868.

The alumni association was established circa 1918.

In 2005, 73 pupils attended the school. The western part of state was the point of origin of the majority.

== Campus ==
It has 50 acres (20 ha) of area.

It includes a dormitory for students that operates during the school week.
