= Canopus in Argos =

Novel series by Doris Lessing

Canopus in Argos: Archives
- Re: Colonised Planet 5, Shikasta; The Marriages Between Zones Three, Four and Five; The Sirian Experiments; The Making of the Representative for Planet 8 The Sentimental Agents in the Volyen Empire
- Author: Doris Lessing
- Country: United States; United Kingdom
- Genre: Science fiction
- Publisher: Alfred A. Knopf (US); Jonathan Cape (UK)
- Published: 1979–1983
- Media type: Print (hardback & paperback)

Canopus in Argos: Archives is a sequence of five science fiction novels by Nobel laureate author Doris Lessing, which portray a number of societies at different stages of development, over a great period of time. The focus is on accelerated evolution guided by advanced species for less advanced species and societies.

== Overview ==
The novels all take place in the same future history, but do not form a continuous storyline. Each book covers unrelated events, with the exception of Shikasta and The Sirian Experiments, which tell the story of accelerated evolution on Earth through the eyes of Canopeans and Sirians, respectively.

== Novels ==
1. Re: Colonised Planet 5, Shikasta (1979) – A secret history of Earth from the perspective of the advanced Canopus civilisation that is thinking in eons rather than centuries. The history spans from the very beginning of life into a future World War Three. It includes the trial of all Europeans for the crimes of colonialism.
2. The Marriages Between Zones Three, Four and Five (1980) – Depicts the influence of unknown higher powers on interactions between a series of civilizational "zones" of varying degrees of advancement that encircle the planet Earth. One zone is representative of an overtly feminine high civilisation initially coupled by royal marriage to a militant and male civilisation. The novel culminates with the latter, male, civilisation allying with a tribal female realm again following directives from Canopus.
3. The Sirian Experiments (1980) – Focuses, like Shikasta, on the history of Earth, but from the perspective of visitors from Sirius rather than Canopus. The Sirians are depicted as a highly managed society, with fascist overtones, that attempts experiments on lesser civilisations while trying to mitigate the stagnation of their ruling class. The story is told from the perspective of Ambien II, one of a peer group of five who rule Sirius.
4. The Making of the Representative for Planet 8 (1982) – The story of the civilisation on a planet that, because of interstellar "re-alignments", is slowly facing extinction, and Canopus's relationship with them. The story is greatly influenced by Robert Falcon Scott's Antarctic expedition, and is Lessing's homage to it.
5. The Sentimental Agents in the Volyen Empire (1983) – A story of Canopean agents on a less advanced planet; explores hazards of rhetoric and mirrors events in revolutionary societies such as Communist Russia.

The five books have also appeared compiled in a single volume entitled Canopus in Argos: Archives (1992, ISBN 0-679-74184-4).

== Background ==
When Lessing began writing Shikasta she intended it to be a "single self-contained book" but, as her fictional universe developed, she found she had ideas for more than just one book, and ended up writing a series of five.

The Canopus in Argos series as a whole falls into categories of social or soft science fiction ("space fiction" in Lessing's own words) because of its focus on characterisation and social-cultural issues, and its lack of emphasis of the details of scientific technology. These books represented a major shift of focus for Lessing, influenced by spiritual and mystical themes in Sufism, in particular by Idries Shah. She later wrote several essays on Sufism which were published in her essay collection, Time Bites (2004).

== Reception ==
The Canopus in Argos was not well received by some reviewers and readers, who felt that Lessing had abandoned her "rational worldview". This prompted her to write in the preface to the third book, The Sirian Experiments:

I would so like it if reviewers and readers could see this series, Canopus in Argos: Archive, as a framework that enables me to tell (I hope) a beguiling tale or two; to put questions, both to myself and to others; to explore ideas and sociological possibilities.

Later Lessing discovered that many younger people who had read the Canopus series were not interested in her other works. They told her, "Oh, realism, I can't be bothered with that."

== Adaptations ==
The Making of the Representative for Planet 8 and The Marriages Between Zones Three, Four and Five have been adapted as operas by composer Philip Glass with librettos written by Lessing. The Marriages... is described as the second part of an opera trilogy based on Canopus in Argos.

- The Making of the Representative for Planet 8 (1986)
- The Marriages Between Zones Three, Four and Five (1997)
