= On Moral Fiction =

1978 essay collection by John Gardner

- On Moral Fiction, first edition paperback.
- Author: John Gardner
- Language: English
- Publication date: 1978

On Moral Fiction is a 1978 work of literary criticism by the American novelist John Gardner. The book argues that true art must be moral, that is, challenging and open-mindedly defining human values, and that most of contemporary literature fails this test. Gardner says that moral fiction "attempts to test human values, not for the purpose of preaching or peddling a particular ideology, but in a truly honest and open-minded effort to find out which best promotes human fulfillment."

The book was controversial upon release, received as an attack against postmodernism and most contemporary authors at the time, ultimately harming Gardner's reputation. More recently, On Moral Fiction has been considered by scholars as less polemical, and more a work of criticism in the same line as Leo Tolstoy's What Is Art?, which Gardner draws upon.

== Part I: Premises on art and morality ==
Gardner's first premises is that true art is reflective of human life and possibility, constructive, and "life-giving" - what he defines as moral. He distinguishes this from trivial art that does not care for this goal, and false art that is built on tearing down morality.

Gardner defines morality in art as engaging with the creation of values and inspiring people towards "virture [and] life affirmation as opposed to destruction or indifference." He differentiates this from didacticism or "cornball morality" that attempts straightforward moral instruction authoritarian by nature, such as Mein Kampf. Since art creates norms and affects behavior, Gardner states that morality in art becomes necessary and that a moral approach to art does not require God or religion. Gardner then contends with the difficulty of taking a moral approach to art when neither religion nor the secular opinion of one man is sufficient. He argues that the purpose of art is to answer this question, to engage with moral dilemmas and advance them rather than retreat into escapism or obfuscation of values.

Gardner states art and criticism require a balance of "detail and generality, the particular and the universal." He argues contemporary criticism, music, and theater overemphasize categorization, deconstruction, and technicality without artistic merit. In literature, this shows up as popular literary trends, slogans, techniques, attention drawn to fiction's lie rather than story, paired with a lack of emotion and conviction. Gardner terms this "fiction as pure language" or "texture over structure," and argues beauty on its own is not sufficient for true art. The final chapter argues that contemporary literature fails to produce true art according to these definitions. Gardner attacks authors such as Kurt Vonnegut, Joseph Heller, Thomas Pynchon, and John Updike as modernists whose works are forced in their message and therefore false. He praises authors that "celebrate life's potential" such as Toni Morrison, Italo Calvino, Thomas Mann, and John Irving.

== Part II: Principles of art and criticism ==
The second half of the book consists of five essays putting the first half into practice through literary criticism.

- Moral Fiction: Gardner argues that moral fiction emerges from "meaning discovered by the process of fiction's creation," as opposed to planned out stories he terms 'dishonest.' Gardner states this process involves an author using imagination and honesty to test values and imitate reality, discovering the appropriate form along the way.
- Moral Criticism: Gardner distinguishes criticism based on the technical merit of a work from 'moral criticism' concerned with the evaluating the ideals of a work, which he states are goodness, beauty, and honesty. He argues the idea of good is not relative, but obscured, and literature involves excavating what it might be through honesty and depicting it beautifully.
- The Artist As A Critic: Gardner compares philosophy and art, arguing that the abstraction and emotional reality of art gives it power. He argues that all artists are critics engaging with the tradition they emerged from, and the work they produce reflects a reality that is true to them, i.e a moral reality.
- Art and Insanity: Gardner states artists are often at odds with the norms of their societies, and the purpose of an artist is evaluating these norms, making it a moral purpose. He states artists do themselves a disservice when they consider themselves above others, appeal to popularity, or expend energy on trivial matters. Gardner argues the madness of art lies in its process, where an artist must play roles, inhabit other realities, and dream while awake to create a work; He concludes this madness is driven by love of what he admires in life.

== Reception ==
On Moral Fiction received a mixed, mostly negative reception. Critics questioned what they perceived to be an argument fuled by traditionalism and religion, calling the book 'a jeremiad rather than a work of serious criticism.' Gardner was alienated from his contemporaries as a result. Fiction International published a special 1980 issue including 28 negative reviews of Gardner and his book, including from the writers he'd criticized such as John Barth, Gilbert Sorrentino, and John Updike. Gore Vidal referred to Gardner as a "late apostle to the lowbrows, a sort of Christian evangelical who saw Heaven as a paradigmatic American university."

Twenty years after publication, On Moral Fiction received renewed, positive interest from scholars and critics. Edelstein states that the book is imperfect and "overly gloomy" but valuable, being ahead of its time in the later wave of writing on the relationship between ethics and literature. Wendling argued that despite his "table-banging tone," Gardner's contributions are valuable, writing:

"The enormous difficulties of that outward turn have much to do with their cultural milieu, which has reduced language to spin and exaggerated the opposition between freedom or authenticity and fidelity to one's natural and social connections. Gardner pounded the table in On Moral Fiction because he would not carry his identification with that situation to the point of declining to call it an error. In so far as fiction does that, he thought it immoral or sentimental; however appealing, it lies about life. Moral fiction is more tough minded; it qualifies sympathy with our solitude by inviting us into a world larger than that."

== See also ==
- Moral realism
- Roger Shattuck

== Bibliography ==
- On Moral Fiction. Basic Books. 1979. ISBN 978-0-465-05226-4.
