= Freddy's Book =

1980 novel by John Gardner

First edition (publ. Alfred A Knopf)

Freddy's Book is a novel by John Gardner published in 1980.

== Plot summary ==
Freddy's Book is a novel within a novel. The narrator, professor Jack Winesap, is given a manuscript by the son of a friend, a frightening, reclusive young man named Freddy Agaard who is giant-sized due to a glandular imbalance. His father calls him a "monster".

The meeting of the narrator and Freddy serves as the opening of a frame story – a story within a story – that never returns to the outer frame. The reader is left at the end to wonder about the meaning of the story and how it is connected to the character of Freddy in the outer story.

After the opening chapter, the rest of the novel is the narrator reading the story in Freddy's manuscript. It tells the tale of Lars-Goren and the Devil. Lars-Goren Berquist is a middle-aged, vaguely medieval freeman who sets off on a journey to find and kill the Devil. Lars-Goren is a poor relation of Swedish King Gustav. King Gustav has managed his rise to the throne by negotiating a dangerous bargain with the Devil, but Lars-Goren understands the flaw in making such a bargain, and sets out to end it – by killing the Devil. Other characters are the nihilistic Bishop Brast and Lars-Goren's wife.

The Devil shows up as apparitions in the inner story several times, to meet and talk with Lars-Goren, attempting to trick him into failing in his search for the Devil's physical location. The ending is both anticlimactic and grippingly written: Lars-Goren does find the Devil, reclining in the form of a mountain in the wilderness, climbs the "mountain" and kills the Devil with a bone knife, and returns home to his wife.

== Reception ==
Dave Langford reviewed Freddy's Book for White Dwarf #45, and stated that "The inner fantasy is rather good, and oddly reminiscent of R A Lafferty's work, in particular The Flame is Green."

== Reviews ==
- Review by Douglas E. Winter (1980) in Fantasy Newsletter, No. 27 August 1980
- Review by Ursula K. Le Guin (1980) in Dancing at the Edge of the World: Thoughts on Words, Women, Places (1989)
