= The Sentimental Agents in the Volyen Empire =

1983 novel by Doris Lessing

- US first edition cover (Alfred A. Knopf)
- Author: Doris Lessing
- Cover artist: Paul Gamarello
- Language: English
- Series: Canopus in Argos
- Genre: Novel (science fiction)
- Published: 1983 (Alfred A. Knopf, US, Jonathan Cape, UK
- Publication place: United States; United Kingdom
- Media type: Print (hardcover)
- Pages: 178
- ISBN: 0-394-52968-5 (US); 0-224-02130-3 (UK)
- OCLC: 9154744
- Dewey Decimal: 823/.914 19
- LC Class: PR6023.E833 D59 1983
- Preceded by: The Making of the Representative for Planet 8

(Documents Relating to) The Sentimental Agents in the Volyen Empire is a 1983 science fiction novel by Doris Lessing. It is the fifth book in her five-book Canopus in Argos series and comprises a set of documents that describe the final days of the Volyen Empire, located at the edge of our galaxy and under the influence of three other galactic empires, the benevolent Canopus, the tyrannical Sirius, and the malicious Shammat of Puttiora. It was first published in the United States in March 1983 by Alfred A. Knopf, and in the United Kingdom in May 1983 by Jonathan Cape.

The Sentimental Agents in the Volyen Empire is a social satire written in the tradition of Jonathan Swift and George Orwell, and focuses on the debasement of language in political rhetoric. In Lessing's fictional universe it is propaganda that keeps the fragile empires afloat, and when language becomes too distorted, some of her characters succumb to a condition called "undulant rhetoric" and are placed in a Hospital for Rhetorical Diseases.

Because of its focus on characterisation and social/cultural issues, and the de-emphasis of technological details, this book is not strictly science fiction but soft science fiction, or "space fiction" as Lessing calls her Canopus in Argos series. While The Sentimental Agents can be read as a stand-alone book, Lessing does continue with the history of the Sirian Empire, picking up from where she left off in The Sirian Experiments (1980), the third book in the Canopus series.

== Plot summary ==
The Volyen Empire is a relatively weak interstellar empire situated at the edge of our galaxy. It comprises the planet Volyen, its two moons, Volyenadna and Volyendesta (also referred to as planets), and two neighbouring planets, Maken and Slovin. Intelligent life evolved independently on each of these five "planets", and over time unstable empires formed, where each planet for a period ruled the others. The Volyen Empire is the last of these empires and rules the region with force and repression.

Although this system is at the edge of the Canopean Empire's sphere of influence, Canopus sends agents to the region because Volyen's colonisation of Maken and Slovin provoked the Sirian Empire who had earmarked these planets for "possible expansion". In addition, Shammat, Canopus's enemy, had established a presence in the region.

Disillusioned and oppressed, the citizens of Volyen and its colonies start speaking out against the Volyen government. Revolutionary groups form and counter the Empire's rhetoric with rhetoric of their own. Krolgul of Shammat, buoyed by the turmoil, encourages anti-government behaviour. Klorathy, a senior Canopean Colonial administrator, is sent to Volyen to observe the unfolding events, and to monitor Incent, one of his agents who has been caught up in the sentiment of the revolutionary rhetoric. Incent has also fallen prey to Krolgul's propaganda and is withdrawn from the field by Klorathy and placed in a Hospital for Rhetorical Diseases on Volyendesta.

Sirius is now threatening to invade the region, and this is welcomed by the downtrodden in the Volyen Empire because they are sure that Sirius will set them free. Many citizens became Sirian agents and provide Sirius with information and support. But the Sirian Empire is itself in turmoil. A conflict on Sirius split the governing oligarchy into the Questioners, led by the Five who want Sirius's expansion program halted, and the Conservers, who believe Sirius should continue colonising other planets. The Five were defeated and Sirius resumed its expansion, but this time with an uncontrolled brutality that turned the Sirian Empire into a tyranny. When the Sirian agents learn about Sirius's tyranny, their loyalties are divided between Sirius and Volyen, and they become known as "sentimental agents".

Sirius invades the Volyen Empire with troops from nearby Sirian occupied planets. The troops, themselves colonial subjects of the now declining Sirian Empire, had been told that Volyen was poor and deprived and needed Sirius's help. But, when they land, they discover that the Volyens are better off than they are, and return home and declare their own planets independent from Sirius. Volyenadna and Volyendesta, with Klorathy's help, become self-sustaining and declare their independence from the crumbling Volyen Empire.

The change of circumstances in the region weakens Krolgul and his influence, and he returns to Shammat. Incent, now "recovered" from his illness, decides that he is going to help Krolgul. Klorathy, still Incent's custodian, follows him to Shammat.

== Characters ==
"It can be considered a rule that the probable duration of an Empire may be prognosticated by the degree to which its rulers believe in their own propaganda."

— Extract from a report used by Klorathy in the Canopean Colonial Service classes he taught.

Volyen Empire

- Grice – Volyen governor on Volyenadna
- Calder – miners' leader on Volyenadna
- Ormarin – rebel leader on Volyendesta

Canopus

- Klorathy – senior Canopean Colonial administrator
- Incent – Canopean agent

Shammat

- Krolgul – Shammat representative to Volyen

== Reception ==
Edward Rothstein in a review in The New York Times describes The Sentimental Agents in the Volyen Empire as "a satirical romp through rhetoric in a foreign empire", but complains that the tone of the book "wavers uncertainly, mixing farce, cynicism and banal religiosity."

In another New York Times review, Michiko Kakutani writes that in this book Lessing has "narrowed her cosmic focus to a specific issue, namely the manipulative use of language and words" which, she believes, was handled with "more acerbity and more humour" by George Orwell in Animal Farm (1945) and Nineteen Eighty-Four (1949).

== Works cited ==
- Lessing, Doris (1994a) [1979]. Shikasta. London: Flamingo. ISBN 0-00-712776-6.
- Lessing, Doris (1994b) [1980]. The Sirian Experiments. London: Flamingo. ISBN 0-00-654721-4.
- Lessing, Doris (1994c) [1983]. The Sentimental Agents in the Volyen Empire. London: Flamingo. ISBN 0-00-654722-2.
