= The Sunlight Dialogues =

1972 novel by John Gardner

- First edition cover
- Author: John Gardner
- Cover artist: John Napper
- Language: English
- Genre: Philosophical fiction
- Publisher: Alfred A. Knopf
- Publication date: 1972
- Publication place: United States
- Media type: Print (hardback and paperback)
- Pages: 712 pp
- ISBN: 0-394-47144-X
- OCLC: 333602
- Dewey Decimal: 813/.5/4
- LC Class: PZ4.G23117 Su PS3557.A712

The Sunlight Dialogues is a 1972 novel by the American author John Gardner.

== Plot summary ==
The novel is set in the 1960s in Batavia, New York. It follows Batavia police chief Fred Clumly in his pursuit of a magician known as the Sunlight Man, a champion of existential freedom and pre-biblical Babylonian philosophy. As Clumly believes in absolute law, order, justice and a Judeo-Christian world view, the two butt their ideological heads in a number of dialogues, all recorded on audiocassette by Clumly. Each of these two characters attempts to exert power over the other—Clumly with the law behind him and the Sunlight Man with his magic and violence—until they wear down not only each other, but many of the other characters with whom they come into contact. A myriad of side-stories provides background for the plot.

== Characters in "The Sunlight Dialogues" ==
- Fred Clumly
- Esther Clumly
- The Sunlight Man
- Domenic "Miller" Sangirgonio
- Stan Kozlowski
- Will Hodge, Sr.
- Mildred Jewel
- Will Hodge, Jr.
- Luke Hodge
- Ben Hodge
- Vanessa Woodchurch
- Kathleen Paxton
- Clive Paxton
- Nick Slater
- Vernon Slater
- Mickey Salvador
- John Figlow
- R.V. Kleppmann
- Mrs. Kleppmann
- Walter Benson/Boyle
- Marguerite Benson
- Oliver Nuper

== Critical response ==
In the Kirkus Reviews, the novel is summated as "A complex and difficult fable of curiously American relevance; a book of bleak humors and raw surprises which mine — and sometimes undermine — the fictional ground with speculative brilliance."
