= The Making of the Representative for Planet 8 (novel) =

1982 novel by Doris Lessing

- US first edition cover (Alfred A. Knopf)
- Author: Doris Lessing
- Cover artist: Paul Gamarello
- Language: English
- Series: Canopus in Argos
- Genre: Novel (science fiction)
- Published: 1982 Alfred A. Knopf, US; Jonathan Cape, UK
- Publication place: United Kingdom, US
- Media type: Print (hardcover)
- Pages: 190
- ISBN: 0-394-51906-X (US); 0-224-02008-0 (UK)
- OCLC: 7174318
- Dewey Decimal: 823/.914 19
- LC Class: PR6023.E833 M34 1982
- Preceded by: The Sirian Experiments
- Followed by: The Sentimental Agents in the Volyen Empire

The Making of the Representative for Planet 8 is a 1982 science fiction novel by Doris Lessing. It is the fourth book in her five-book Canopus in Argos series and relates the fate of a planet, under the care of the benevolent galactic empire Canopus, that is plunged into an ice age. It was first published in the United States in January 1982 by Alfred A. Knopf, and in the United Kingdom in March 1982 by Jonathan Cape.

Christopher Lehmann-Haupt of The New York Times wrote in a review of this book that "the effect of the story is powerful and immediate – with all the drama of good polar-exploration literature, and the eloquence, at its best, of the King James Bible." However, John Leonard, also of The New York Times, was critical of Lessing's switch to science fiction and in a review of this book, complained that "Mrs. Lessing is no longer very interested in people. She has come to feel that individuality is a 'degenerative disease'... She seems ... to be in the process of junking not only traditional narrative and conventional characters but the details of feeling as well..."

The Making of the Representative for Planet 8 can be read as a stand-alone book, although it does make reference to the planet Shikasta, introduced in the first book of the Canopus series.

== Plot summary ==
Planet 8 is a small world that was colonised by the benevolent galactic empire Canopus and populated with a new species created from the stock of four different species originating on several other Canopean planets. Planet 8 has a warm temperate climate and, under Canopus's skilled guidance, the inhabitants live comfortably and at peace with themselves and their world.

One day Canopus instructs them to build a huge wall, to exact Canopean specifications, right around the girth of the planet. The construction takes the inhabitants years to complete, and when it is finished, Canopus tells the planet's representatives, leaders of each of the planet's main disciplines, to relocate all settlements north of the wall to the south. Canopus informs everyone that unfortunate interstellar "re-alignments" have taken place and that Planet 8 will soon experience an ice age. After a while temperatures start to drop and the climate begins to change. Glaciers form in the north and slowly advance towards the wall. Canopus, however, assures Planet 8 that Canopus has a new home for them, a peaceful and prosperous world called Rohanda (the subject of the first book in this series, Shikasta), and that when it has reached a certain level of development, Canopus will space-lift the inhabitants of Planet 8 to Rohanda. This fills the people of Planet 8 with hope as they are forced to adapt their lifestyles to cope with this new and unfamiliar climate.

By the time the glaciers reach the wall, much of the vegetation in the south has been destroyed by snow and ice and conditions grow worse. Conflict breaks out amongst the erstwhile peaceful villagers as food becomes scarce. But the wall holds the glaciers back and the people still remain resolute in their faith that Canopus will rescue them. Then Canopean agent Johor (first introduced in Shikasta) arrives on Planet 8 with the devastating news that disaster has struck Rohanda: it has been renamed Shikasta (the stricken) and is no longer available for re-settlement. But Johor does not leave Planet 8. He remains to endure the hardships with the villagers and does what he can to help them face their inevitable demise.

In time, when the population is now faced with starvation, the wall, which was only a temporary barrier, gives way and the glaciers start over-running settlements in the south. The senior representatives, at a loss as to what to do, head north over the wall and onto the glacier. Johor travels with them as they try to reach the pole, but they soon all succumb to cold and hunger. Their physical bodies perish, but their "beings" rise and merge into a single consciousness that becomes the Representative for Planet 8 and all its memories. After watching Planet 8 freeze over completely, the Representative departs for a place "where Canopus tends and guards and instructs."

== Characters ==
Canopus

- Johor – Canopean agent

Planet 8

- Doeg – Memory Maker and Keeper of Records, narrator
- Alsi – apprentice, engaged with the nurture of growing animals
- Nonni – apprentice
- Marl – Keeper of the Herds
- Klin – Fruit Maker, Guardian of the Orchards
- Masson – Representative for Housing and Sheltering
- Bratch – Representative for Health
- Pedug – Representative for Education of the Young
- Rivalin – Custodians of the Lake
- Zdanye – those who sheltered and protected

== Afterword ==
The book contains a 30-page afterword in which Lessing states that The Making of the Representative for Planet 8 and the previous book in this series, The Sirian Experiments were inspired by her 50-year fascination in the ill-fated 1910–13 Antarctic expedition of Robert Falcon Scott, though not, she points out, by the element of ice and polar conditions in itself.

Lessing expresses a concern that Scott and his explorers, heroes in their day, were vilified by recent generations. She analyses the disastrous expedition and the changes as to how it, and Scott himself, have been viewed by posterity, and discusses these changes in the popular views of the journey in connection with the changing fashions of thought and the decline of imperialist ideas. The efforts of Scott and his men, she concludes, should be understood as a deliberate wager with destiny rather than a scientific project: they tried to transcend themselves by taking on responsibilities they knew they might not be fully equipped for or experienced enough to handle, which ultimately cost many of them their lives. Lessing explicitly likens this view of the pride in sacrifice and self-transcending to the expectations and propaganda imagery of World War I soon after.

== Adaptations ==
- The Making of the Representative for Planet 8 (opera, 1986)

The Making of the Representative for Planet 8 was adapted for the opera in 1986 by composer Philip Glass with story-libretto by Doris Lessing. The three-act opera, for orchestra, small chorus and soloists was commissioned by the Houston Grand Opera, the English National Opera and the Landestheater Kiel in Germany. It first premiered on 8 July 1988 at the Houston Grand Opera in Houston, Texas. The British premiere was on 9 November 1988 by the English National Opera at the London Coliseum. The premiere received a lukewarm review by New York Times music critic John Rockwell.

In 1997, Glass adapted another of Lessing's books from this series for the opera, The Marriages Between Zones Three, Four and Five.

== Works cited ==
- Lessing, Doris (1994) [1982]. The Making of the Representative for Planet 8. London: Flamingo. ISBN 0-00-654718-4.
