= The Sirian Experiments =

1980 novel by Doris Lessing

- US first edition cover (Alfred A. Knopf)
- Author: Doris Lessing
- Cover artist: Paul Gamarello
- Language: English
- Series: Canopus in Argos
- Genre: Novel (science fiction)
- Published: 1980 Alfred A. Knopf, US, Jonathan Cape, UK
- Publication place: United States; United Kingdom
- Media type: Print (hardcover)
- Pages: 331
- ISBN: 0-394-51231-6 (US); 0-224-01891-4 (UK)
- OCLC: 5941786
- Dewey Decimal: 823/.914
- LC Class: PR6023.E833 S57 1981
- Preceded by: The Marriages Between Zones Three, Four and Five
- Followed by: The Making of the Representative for Planet 8

The Sirian Experiments is a 1980 science fiction novel by Doris Lessing. It is the third book in her five-book Canopus in Argos series and continues the story of Earth's evolution, which has been manipulated from the beginning by advanced extraterrestrial civilisations. It was first published in the United States in December 1980 by Alfred A. Knopf, and in the United Kingdom in March 1981 by Jonathan Cape. The book was shortlisted for the Booker Prize in 1981.

The Sirian Experiments relates directly to the first book in this series, Shikasta, which is the history of the planet Shikasta (an allegorical Earth) under the influence of three galactic empires, Canopus, Sirius and their mutual enemy, Puttiora. Shikasta is told from the Canopean viewpoint. The Sirian Experiments (subtitled The Report by Ambien II, of the Five) tells the story of Shikasta from the Sirian point of view and describes the activities of Sirians on the planet and the strained relations of Sirius with Canopus.

Lessing stated in an afterword in the next book in this series that The Sirian Experiments and The Making of the Representative for Planet 8 were inspired by her 50-year fascination with the ill-fated 1910–13 Antarctic expedition of Robert Falcon Scott.

== Genre and reception ==
Because of its focus on characterisation and social/cultural issues, and the de-emphasis of technological details, The Sirian Experiments is soft science fiction, or "space fiction" as Lessing calls her Canopus in Argos series. Robert Alter of The New York Times suggested that this kind of writing belongs to a genre literary critic Northrop Frye called the "anatomy", which is "a combination of fantasy and morality" and that "presents us with a vision of the world in terms of a single intellectual pattern." Lessing stated that she used this series as a vehicle to "put questions, both to myself and to others" and to "explore ideas and sociological possibilities."

While Lessing's switch to "science fiction" in the late 1970s was not well received by all, the series in general has drawn positive criticism. Two reviews of The Sirian Experiments in The New York Times said that Lessing achieves "… a largeness of vision beyond the horizon of the conventional novel." and that it has "… some playful moments and some splendid ones. It is interesting, however, primarily because Doris Lessing wrote it." Time on the other hand, which had spoken highly of the first two books in this series, felt that this one "may be a small misstep on a long journey."

== Plot summary ==
The Sirian Empire, centred in the Sirius star system, has advanced technology that made their citizens effectively immortal (barring accidents) and sophisticated machines that did almost everything for them. But this technology came at a price: many Sirians became afflicted with "the existentials", a debilitating malady that left them feeling worthless and with no reason to exist. To overcome this problem and give its people "something to do", Sirius embarked on a conquest of space and colonised many planets. But they also encroached on territory of the superior Canopean Empire that led to a costly war, which Canopus won. As a gesture of reconciliation, Canopus returned all the captured Sirian territory and invited Sirius to jointly colonise a new and promising planet called Rohanda (an allegorical Earth). Canopus took the northern continents and gave Sirius the southern continents.

Ambien II, one of the Five who run the Sirian Colonial Service and also govern the Sirian Empire, represents Sirius on Rohanda. She sets in motion a series of bio-sociological and genetic experiments where large numbers of primitive indigenous people from Sirian colonised planets are space-lifted to Rohanda and adapted there for work elsewhere in the Empire. In the north, Canopus nurtures Rohanda's bourgeoning humanoids and accelerates their evolution. They also put a Lock on the planet that links it to the harmony and strength of the Canopean Empire. Canopus keeps Ambien II updated with reports of all their work, but she is suspicious of Sirius's former enemy, seeing them as a competitor rather than a partner, and is unable to correctly interpret them.

Then an unforeseen "cosmic re-alignment" breaks the Lock and Shammat of the malicious Puttiora Empire begins exploiting the situation by corrupting Rohanda's Natives. Canopus, seeing Rohanda decline, renames the planet Shikasta (the stricken). Sirius, unconcerned about Canopus's troubles in the north, continue to refer to the planet as Rohanda.

In an attempt to foster better relations with Sirius, Klorathy, a senior Canopean Colonial administrator, invites Ambien II to observe events in their territory. Ambien II, eager to learn more about Canopus, agrees. As Rohanda evolves and civilisations come and go, Ambien II and Klorathy meet several times to watch Rohanda's degeneration. Canopus does what it can to help communities, but with Shammat's evil and a broken Lock, they make little progress. From time to time Klorathy requests Ambien II's help and while working on the planet, she meets Nasar, another Canopean official. She also encounters Tafta, the Shammat commander on Rohanda, and at one point nearly succumbs to his corruption.

Ambien II eventually abandons the Sirian Experiments in the south when they are overrun by Shammat. The Five want her to abandon Rohanda altogether, but she has become too attached to the planet and is warming to Canopus and seeing the error of her (and Sirius's) ways. The Five question her ties to their former enemy, but when she tries to explain herself, they do not hear what she is saying, just as she initially could not hear what Canopus was saying. The Five then send her to Planet 13 on "corrective exile" to write a report on what has happened (this book). When she later releases the report, the Five issues a statement denying the authenticity of Ambien II's work.

== Characters ==
Sirius

- The Five – peer group of five senior administrators of the Sirian Colonial Service
- Ambien II – one of the Five, Sirian representative to Rohanda

Canopus

- Klorathy – senior Canopean Colonial administrator
- Nasar – permanent official on Rohanda

Shammat

- Tafta – Shammat representative to Rohanda

== Works cited ==
- Lessing, Doris (1994a) [1979]. Shikasta. London: Flamingo. ISBN 0-00-712776-6.
- Lessing, Doris (1994b) [1980]. The Sirian Experiments. London: Flamingo. ISBN 0-00-654721-4.
- Lessing, Doris (1994c) [1982]. The Making of the Representative for Planet 8. London: Flamingo. ISBN 0-00-654718-4.
