= Shikasta =

1979 novel by Doris Lessing

- US first edition cover (Alfred A. Knopf)
- Author: Doris Lessing
- Cover artist: Paul Gamarello
- Language: English
- Series: Canopus in Argos
- Genre: Novel (science fiction)
- Publisher: Alfred A. Knopf (US); Jonathan Cape (UK)
- Publication date: October 1979 (US); November 1979 (UK)
- Publication place: United Kingdom
- Media type: Print (hardcover)
- Pages: 448
- ISBN: 0-394-50732-0 (US); 0-224-01767-5 (UK)
- OCLC: 4774671
- Dewey Decimal: 823/.9/14
- LC Class: PZ3.L56684 Sh 1979 PR6023.E833
- Preceded by: –
- Followed by: The Marriages Between Zones Three, Four and Five

Re: Colonised Planet 5, Shikasta (often shortened to Shikasta) is a 1979 science fiction novel by Doris Lessing, and is the first book in her five-book Canopus in Argos series. It was first published in the United Kingdom in November 1979 by Jonathan Cape, and in the United States in December 1980 by Alfred A. Knopf. Shikasta is also the name of the fictional planet featured in the novel.

Subtitled "Personal, psychological, historical documents relating to visit by Johor (George Sherban) Emissary (Grade 9) 87th of the Period of the Last Days", Shikasta is the history of the planet Shikasta (whose inhabitants call it Earth) under the influence of three galactic empires, Canopus, Sirius, and their mutual enemy, Puttiora. The book is presented in the form of a series of reports by Canopean emissaries to Shikasta who document the planet's prehistory, its degeneration leading to the "Century of Destruction" (the 20th century), and the Apocalypse (World War III).

Shikasta draws on the Old Testament and is influenced by spiritual and mystical themes in Sufism, an Islamic belief system in which Lessing had taken an interest in the mid-1960s. The book represented a major shift of focus in Lessing's writing, from realism to science fiction, and this disappointed many of her readers. It received mixed reviews from critics. Some were impressed by the scope and vision of the book, with one reviewer calling it "an audacious and disturbing work from one of the world's great living writers". Others were critical of the novel's bleakness, that humanity has no free will and that their fate lies in the hands of galactic empires.

The story of Shikasta is retold in the third book of the Canopus series, The Sirian Experiments (1980), this time from the point of view of Sirius. Shikasta reappears in the fourth book in the series, The Making of the Representative for Planet 8 (1982), and the Zones, briefly mentioned in Shikasta, are the subject of the second book in the series, The Marriages Between Zones Three, Four and Five (1980).

== Plot summary ==
Canopus, a benevolent galactic empire centred at Canopus in the constellation Argo Navis, colonises a young and promising planet they name Rohanda (the fruitful). They nurture its burgeoning humanoids and accelerate their evolution. When the Natives are ready, Canopus imposes a "Lock" on Rohanda that links it via "astral currents" to the harmony and strength of the Canopean Empire. In addition to Canopus, two other empires also establish a presence on the planet: their ally, Sirius from the star of the same name, and their mutual enemy, Puttiora. The Sirians confine their activities largely to genetic experiments on the southern continents during Rohanda's prehistory (described in Lessing's third book in the Canopus series, The Sirian Experiments), while the Shammat of Puttiora remain dormant, waiting for opportunities to strike.

For many millennia the Natives of Rohanda prosper in a Canopean induced climate of peaceful coexistence and accelerated development. Then an unforeseen "cosmic re-alignment" puts Rohanda out of phase with Canopus which causes the Lock to break. Deprived of Canopus's resources and a steady stream of a substance called SOWF (substance-of-we-feeling), the Natives develop a "Degenerative Disease" that puts the goals of the individual ahead of those of the community. The Shammat exploit this disturbance and begin undermining Canopus's influence by infecting the Natives with their evil ways. As Rohanda degenerates into greed and conflict, the Canopeans reluctantly change its name to Shikasta (the stricken). Later in the book, Shikasta is identified as Earth.

In an attempt to salvage Canopus's plans for Shikasta and correct the Natives' decline, Canopean emissaries are sent to the planet. Johor is one such emissary, who takes on the form of a Native and begins identifying those individuals who have not degenerated too far and are amenable to his corrective instructions. Johor then sends those he has successfully "converted" to spread the word among other Natives, and soon isolated communities begin to return to the pre-Shikastan days. But without the SOWF, Canopus is fighting a losing battle against Shammat's influence over the Natives and the planet declines further. By the Shikastan's 20th century, the planet has degenerated into war and self-destruction. Johor returns, but this time through Zone 6 (Note: Shikasta is surround by six metaphysical Zones (akin to cosmological planes), each representing different "levels of spiritual being"; Zone 6 is "closest" to Shikasta and is the plane to which "souls" of the planet's dead go, and from which souls are reborn (reincarnated) back to the planet. Lessing elaborates on the Zones in the next book in the Canopus series, The Marriages Between Zones Three, Four and Five (1980).) from which he is born on the planet (incarnated) as a Shikastan, George Sherban. As Sherban grows up, he establishes contact with other Canopeans in disguise and then resumes his work trying to help the Shikastans. But famine and unemployment grow, and anarchy spreads.

On the eve of World War III, Sherban and other emissaries relocate a small number of promising Shikastans to remote locations to escape the coming nuclear holocaust. He also takes part in the trial of all Europeans for the crimes of colonialism. Europe has been conquered by China, but he persuades people that Europe was not the only offender.

The war reduces Shikasta's population by 99% and sweeps the planet clean of the "barbarians". The Shammat, who set the Shikastans on a course of self-destruction, destruct themselves and withdraw from the planet. The Canopeans help the survivors to rebuild their lives and re-align themselves with Canopus. With a strengthened Lock and the SOWF flowing freely again, harmony and prosperity return to Shikasta.

== Background and genre ==
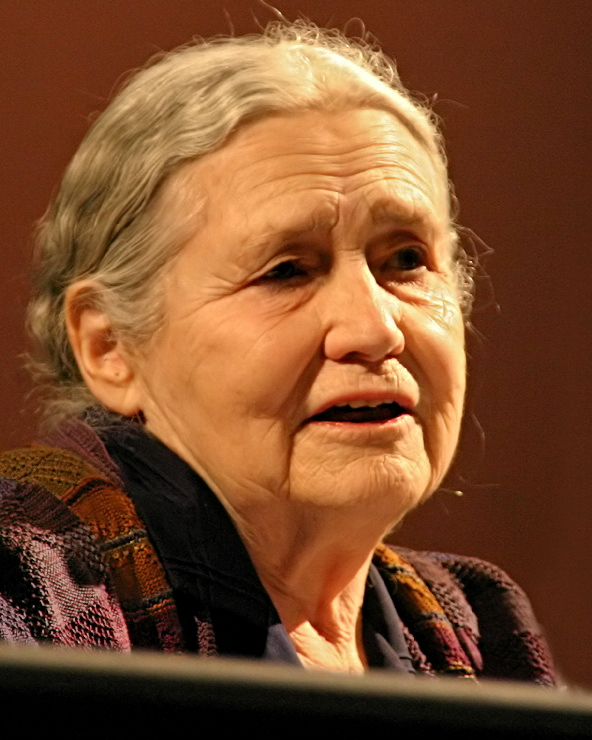
Doris Lessing speaking at a Cologne literature festival in Germany, 2006

In the mid-1960s Lessing had become interested in Sufism, an Islamic belief system, after reading The Sufis by Idries Shah. She described The Sufis as "the most surprising book [she] had read", and said it "changed [her] life". Lessing later met Shah, who became "a good friend [and] teacher". In the early 1970s Lessing began writing "inner space" fiction, which included the novels Briefing for a Descent into Hell (1971) and Memoirs of a Survivor (1974). In the late 1970s she wrote Shikasta in which she used many Sufi concepts.

Shikasta was intended to be a "single self-contained book", but as Lessing's fictional universe developed, she found she had ideas for more than just one book, and ended up writing a series of five. Shikasta, and the Canopus in Argos series as a whole, fall into the category of soft science fiction ("space fiction" in Lessing's own words) due to their focus on characterization and social and cultural issues, and the de-emphasis of science and technology. Robert Alter of The New York Times suggested that this kind of writing belongs to a genre literary critic Northrop Frye called the "anatomy", which is "a combination of fantasy and morality". Gore Vidal placed Lessing's "science fiction" "somewhere between John Milton and L. Ron Hubbard".

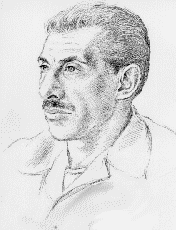
Idries Shah, who introduced Lessing to Sufism

Shikasta represented a major shift of focus for Lessing, influenced by spiritual and mystical themes in Sufism. This switch to "science fiction" was not well received by readers and critics. By the late 1970s, Lessing was considered "one of the most honest, intelligent and engaged writers of the day", and Western readers unfamiliar with Sufism were dismayed that Lessing had abandoned her "rational worldview". George Stade of The New York Times complained that "our Grand Mistress of lumpen realism has gone religious on us". The reaction of reviewers and readers to the first two books in the series, Shikasta and The Marriages Between Zones Three, Four and Five (1980), prompted Lessing to write in the Preface to the third book in the series, The Sirian Experiments (1980):

I would so like it if reviewers and readers could see this series, Canopus in Argos: Archive, as a framework that enables me to tell (I hope) a beguiling tale or two; to put questions, both to myself and to others; to explore ideas and sociological possibilities.

Further criticism of the Canopus series followed, which included this comment by New York Times critic John Leonard: "One of the many sins for which the 20th century will be held accountable is that it has discouraged Mrs. Lessing ... She now propagandizes on behalf of our insignificance in the cosmic razzmatazz." Lessing replied by saying: "What they didn't realize was that in science fiction is some of the best social fiction of our time. I also admire the classic sort of science fiction, like Blood Music, by Greg Bear. He's a great writer." Lessing said in 1983 that she would like to write stories about red and white dwarfs, space rockets powered by anti-gravity, and charmed and coloured quarks, "[b]ut we can't all be physicists".

Lessing later wrote several essays on Sufism which were published in her essay collection, Time Bites (2004). She was awarded the 2007 Nobel Prize in Literature, and was described by the Swedish Academy as "that epicist of the female experience, who with scepticism, fire and visionary power has subjected a divided civilisation to scrutiny".

Lessing dedicated Shikasta to her father. While she was still a child in Southern Rhodesia (now Zimbabwe) he often used to gaze up at the night sky and say, "Makes you think – there are so many worlds up there, wouldn't really matter if we did blow ourselves up – plenty more where we came from." Shikasta gave rise to a religious cult in America. Lessing said in an interview that its followers had written to her and asked, "When are we going to be visited by the gods?", and she told them that the book is "not a cosmology. It's an invention", and they replied, "Ah, you're just testing us".

== Analysis ==
"The lowest, the most downtrodden, the most miserable of Shikastans will watch the wind moving a plant, and smile; will plant a seed and watch it grow; will stand to watch the life of the clouds. Or lie pleasurably awake in the dark, hearing wind howl that cannot—not this time—harm him where he lies safe. This is where strength has always welled, irrepressibly, into every creature of Shikasta."

— Extract from a report, "Additional Explanatory Information II" by Johor, Shikasta, p. 250.

The name "Shikasta" comes from the Persian word شکسته (shikastah, shekasteh) meaning "broken", and is often seen used as the name of the Iranian national style of Persian calligraphy, Shekasteh Nastaʿlīq. In the book, Lessing does not state explicitly that the planet Shikasta is Earth, but many critics believe that its similarities to Earth's history make it clear that Shikasta is Earth as seen by the Canopeans. Some of the documents in the book written by Shikastans refer to geographical locations and countries on Earth. Other critics, however, interpret Shikasta as an allegorical Earth with parallel histories that deviate from time to time.

Shikasta has been called an "anti-novel", and an "architectonic novel". It is the story of the planet Shikasta from the perspective of Canopus and is presented as a case study for "first-year students of Canopean Colonial Rule". It contains a series of reports by Canopean emissaries to the planet, extracts from the Canopean reference, History of Shikasta, and copies of letters and journals written by selected Shikastans. The history of Shikasta is monitored by the virtually immortal Canopeans, from Rohanda's prehistory, through to Shikasta's "Century of Destruction" (Earth's 20th century), and into Earth's future when the Chinese occupy Europe and World War III breaks out. The book purports to be the "true" history of our planet.

Shikasta alludes to the Old Testament, Gnosticism and Sufism, and draws on several Judeo-Christian themes. Lessing wrote in the book's preface that it has its roots in the Old Testament. Her SOWF (Substance-Of-We-Feeling), the "spiritual nourishment" that flows from Canopus to Shikasta, is also a word she invented with a pronunciation similar to "Sufi". A reviewer of the book in the Los Angeles Times said that Shikasta is a "reworking of the Bible", and the Infinity Plus website draws parallels between the Canopeans and their emissaries, and God and his angels from the Old Testament. A New York Times reviewer wrote that the "outer space" where the Canopeans come from is a metaphor for "religious or inner space". Thelma J. Shinn, in her book Worlds Within Women: Myth and Mythmaking in Fantastic Literature by Women, described the struggle between Canopus and Shammat, played out on Shikasta, as the "eternal struggle between good and evil", and the "Degenerative Disease" that strikes Shikasta as a metaphor for the original sin. Lessing said in an interview that the final war (World War III) at the end of the novel is the Apocalypse. Phyllis Sternberg Perrakis wrote in The Journal of Baháʼí Studies that Shikasta is the "symbolic rendering of the coming of a new prophet to an earthlike planet", and relates it to principles of the Baháʼí Faith.

== Reception ==
Paul Gray wrote in a review in Time that the documents that make up Shikasta allow Lessing to stretch the novel out over vast periods of time and shift perspective "dramatically from the near infinite to the minute". He said that the book's cohesiveness is its variety, and noted how Lessing interspaces her "grand designs" and "configurations of enormous powers" with "passages of aching poignancy". Gray said that Shikasta is closer to Gulliver's Travels and the Old Testament than it is to Buck Rogers, and may disappoint readers interpreting her "space fiction" as "science fiction". He found Lessing's bleak vision of Earth's history in which she suggests that humans "could not ... help making the messes they have, that their blunders were all ordained by a small tic in the cosmos", a little "unsatisfying", but added that even if you do not subscribe to her theories, the book can still be enjoyable, "even furiously engaging on every page". Gray called Shikasta "an audacious and disturbing work from one of the world's great living writers".

Author Gore Vidal wrote in The New York Review of Books that Shikasta is a "work of a formidable imagination". He said that Lessing is "a master" of eschatological writing, but added that while her depictions of a terminal London are "very real", as a whole the book is "never quite real enough". Vidal also felt that Zone 6, Lessing's alternate plane for the dead, is not as convincing as The Dry Lands in Ursula K. Le Guin’s Earthsea trilogy. He compared the Canopeans and Shammat to Milton's God and Satan in Paradise Lost, but said that while Lucifer's "overthrow ... of his writerly creator is an awesome thing", in Shikasta Lessing's human race with no free will is too passive and of no interest. Vidal attributed this to Lessing's "surrender" to the Sufis and the SOWF (Substance-Of-We-Feeling), and not her inability to create good characters.

New York Times reviewer George Stade said that Shikasta "forces us to think about ... what we are, how we got that way and where we are going", but complained that the book is filled with "false hopes", and that the fate of humankind relies on "theosophical emanations, cosmic influences, occult powers, spiritual visitations and stellar vibrations". When the SOWF is cut off and the Shikastans degenerate, Lessing "both indicts and exculpates" them, implying that humanity is bad, but it is not their fault. While Stade complimented Lessing on the book's satire, and her depictions of Zone 6, which he said "have the eerie beauty of ancient Gnostic texts", he "disapprove[d]" of the novel as a whole, but added, "that doesn't mean I didn't enjoy reading it".

Writing in the Los Angeles Times. M. G. Lord called Shikasta an "epic" and suspected that it may have influenced the Nobel committee when they referred to Lessing as an "epicist of the female experience". Thelma J. Shinn wrote in her book, Worlds Within Women: Myth and Mythmaking in Fantastic Literature by Women, that Lessing's history of humanity in Shikasta is "pessimistic" but "convincing". Infinity Plus described Shikasta as a "mainstream novel that uses SF ideas", and said that while Lessing was not able to predict the fall of the Soviet Union and the impact of computers, the novel "barely seems dated" because of her "cunningly non-specific" approach.

James Schellenberg writing in Challenging Destiny, a Canadian science fiction and fantasy magazine, was impressed by Shikasta's "grand sense of perspective" and the context of humanity set in a "vaster scale of civilization and right-thinking". He liked the concept of SOWF as a "metaphor of community connectedness", but felt it was an unusual way to build a utopia. The book's fractured storytelling leads to Lessing breaking the "famous dictum of writing – show, don't tell", and while that may work in certain circumstances, Schellenberg felt that that approach does not work very well in Shikasta. The online magazine Journey to the Sea found Lessing's inclusion of stories from the Hebrew Bible "entertaining and intriguing", and said she challenges the logical thinker's rejection of these sacred texts, suggesting that it is "imaginatively possible" that they could be true.

Following Lessing's death in 2013, The Guardian put Shikasta in their list of the top five Lessing books.

== Works cited ==
- Dixson, Barbara (1990). "Structural Complexity in Doris Lessing's Canopus Novels". Journal of the Fantastic in the Arts. 2 (3). Orlando, Florida: International Association for the Fantastic in the Arts: 14–22. JSTOR 43308052.
- Galin, Müge (1997). Between East and West: Sufism in the Novels of Doris Lessing. Albany, New York: State University of New York Press. ISBN 0-7914-3383-8.
- Lessing, Doris (1994a) [1979]. Shikasta. London: Flamingo. ISBN 0-00-712776-6.
- Lessing, Doris (1994b) [1980]. The Sirian Experiments. London: Flamingo. ISBN 0-00-654721-4.
- Perrakis, Phyllis Sternberg (2004). "The Four Levels of Detachment in Doris Lessing's Shikasta" (PDF). The Journal of Baháʼí Studies. 14. Archived from the original (PDF) on 5 May 2012.
- Shinn, Thelma J.; Richard, Thelma (1986). Worlds Within Women: Myth and Mythmaking in Fantastic Literature by Women. Westport, Connecticut: Greenwood Publishing Group. ISBN 9780313251016.
