= The Marriages Between Zones Three, Four and Five =

1980 novel by Doris Lessing

- US first edition cover (Alfred A. Knopf)
- Author: Doris Lessing
- Cover artist: Paul Gamarello
- Language: English
- Series: Canopus in Argos
- Genres: Science fiction; Feminist science fiction
- Publisher: Alfred A. Knopf (US); Jonathan Cape (UK)
- Publication date: March 1980 (US); May 1980 (UK)
- Publication place: United States; United Kingdom
- Media type: Print and ebook
- Pages: 299
- ISBN: 0-394-50914-5 (US); 0-224-01790-X (UK)
- OCLC: 5171635
- Dewey Decimal: 823/.9/14
- LC Class: PZ3.L56684 Map 1980 PR6023.E833
- Preceded by: Shikasta
- Followed by: The Sirian Experiments

The Marriages Between Zones Three, Four and Five is a 1980 science fiction novel by Doris Lessing. It is the second book in her five-book Canopus in Argos series, the first being Shikasta (1979). It was first published in the United States in March 1980 by Alfred A. Knopf, and in the United Kingdom in May 1980 by Jonathan Cape.

The novel takes place in three of six metaphysical Zones that encircle the planet Shikasta (an allegorical Earth), and concerns two ordained marriages that link the patriarchal Zone Four with the matriarchal Zone Three, and the tribal Zone Five. The story is told from the point of view of the matriarchal utopian Zone Three, and is about gender conflict and the breaking down of barriers between the sexes. Lessing called the Canopus in Argos series "space fiction", but The Marriages Between Zones Three, Four and Five is generally referred to as feminist science fiction.

The novel is influenced by spiritual and mystical themes in Sufism, an Islamic belief system in which Lessing had taken an interest in the mid-1960s. The zones are said to correspond to Sufism's different levels of consciousness, and symbolise the "Sufi ladder to enlightenment". Lessing was criticised for abandoning her traditional fiction and switching to science fiction in her Canopus in Argos series. Notwithstanding this criticism, The Marriages was generally well received by critics, with some reviewers calling it one of Lessing's best works on the topic of gender conflict.

The Marriages Between Zones Three, Four and Five was adapted as an opera by composer Philip Glass with story-libretto by Lessing, and premiered in German in Heidelberg, Germany in May 1997. The United States premiere in English was performed in Chicago in June 2001. These productions were not very well received by theatre critics.

== Zones ==
In the opening book of the Canopus in Argos series, Shikasta, Lessing introduced six metaphysical Zones (akin to cosmological planes) that encircle the planet Shikasta (an allegorical Earth (Note: In Shikasta, Lessing does not state explicitly that the planet is Earth, but many critics believe that its similarities to Earth's history make it clear that Shikasta is Earth as seen by the Canopeans. Other critics, however, interpret Shikasta as an allegorical Earth with parallel histories that deviate from time to time.)). These Zones, numbered One to Six, each represent different levels of spiritual being. Shikasta only deals with Zone Six, the innermost and least pure of the Zones, which one commentator described as "a kind of purgatory in which humans wait out the time between incarnations on earth". Adjacent Zones in the numerical sequence border each other, from Zone Six (the lowest) up to Zone One (the highest and purest), each with a terrain more mountainous than the previous.

Three of the Zones in this spiritual landscape feature in The Marriages Between Zones Three, Four and Five, which Lessing describes as self-contained "countries", each with their own "societies". Zone Two, highest in the spiritual hierarchy, is located high in the mountains at the edge of Zone Three, which in turn occupies the hills bordering the lowlands of Zone Four, which is adjacent to the flat desert terrain of Zone Five.

== Plot summary ==
The story opens when the Providers, the invisible and unidentified rulers of all the Zones, (Note: Lessing does not identify the Providers, but some reviewers and critics have assumed that they are the Canopeans in Shikasta.) order Al•Ith, queen of the peaceful paradise of Zone Three, to marry Ben Ata, king of the militarised and repressive Zone Four. Al•Ith is repulsed by the idea of consorting with a barbarian, and Ben Ata does not want a righteous queen disturbing his military campaigns. Nevertheless, Al•Ith descends to Zone Four and they reluctantly marry. Ben Ata is not used to the company of women he cannot control, and Al•Ith has difficulty relating to this ill-bred man, but in time they grow accustomed to each other and gain new insights into each other's Zones. Al•Ith is appalled that all of Zone Four's wealth goes into its huge armies, leaving the rest of its population poor and underdeveloped; Ben Ata is astounded that Zone Three has no army at all.

The marriage bears a son, Arusi, future heir to the two Zones. Some of the women of Zone Four, led by Dabeeb, step in to help Al•Ith. Suppressed and downtrodden, these women relish being in the presence of the queen of Zone Three. But soon after the birth of Arusi, the Providers order Al•Ith to return to Zone Three without her son, and Ben Ata to marry Vahshi, queen of the primitive Zone Five. Al•Ith and Ben Ata have grown fond of each other, and are devastated by this news.

Back in Zone Three, Al•Ith finds that her people have forgotten her, and her sister, Murti• has taken over as queen. Disturbed by the changes she sees in Al•Ith, Murti• exiles her to the frontier of Zone Two. Al•Ith, drawn by its allure, tries to enter Zone Two, but finds an unworldly and inhospitable place and is told by invisible people that it is not her time yet. At the frontier of Zone Five, Ben Ata reluctantly marries Vahshi, a tribal leader of a band of nomads who terrorise the inhabitants of her zone. But Ben Ata's marriage to Al•Ith has changed him, and he disbands most of his armies in Zone Four, sending the soldiers home to rebuild their towns and villages and uplift their communities. He also slowly wins over Vahshi's confidence and persuades her to stop plundering Zone Five.

When Arusi is old enough to travel, Dabeeb and her band of women decide to take him to Zone Three to see Al•Ith. This cross-border excursion is not ordered by the Providers, and Ben Ata has grave misgivings about their decision. In Zone Three the women are shocked to find the deposed Al•Ith working in a stable near Zone Two. While Al•Ith is pleased to see her son, she too has misgivings about Dabeeb's action. The bumptious women's travels through Zone Three evoke feelings of xenophobia in the locals.

After five years of silence, the Providers instruct Ben Ata to go and see Al•Ith in Zone Three. At the border, he is surprised to find a band of youths armed with crude makeshift weapons blocking his way. Clearly they want no more incursions from Zone Four. Ben Ata returns with a large army and enters Zone Three unchallenged. He is not well received, but finds Al•Ith with a small band of followers who have moved to the frontier of Zone Two to be close to her. Ben Ata and Al•Ith reunite; he tells her of the reforms he has introduced in Zone Four and his taming of the "wild one" from Zone Five.

One day Al•Ith enters Zone Two and does not return. But the changes set in motion by the two marriages become evident everywhere. The frontiers between Zones Three, Four, and Five are open, and people and knowledge are flowing between them. Previously stagnant, the three Zones are now filled with enquiry, inspiration, and renewal.

== Background ==
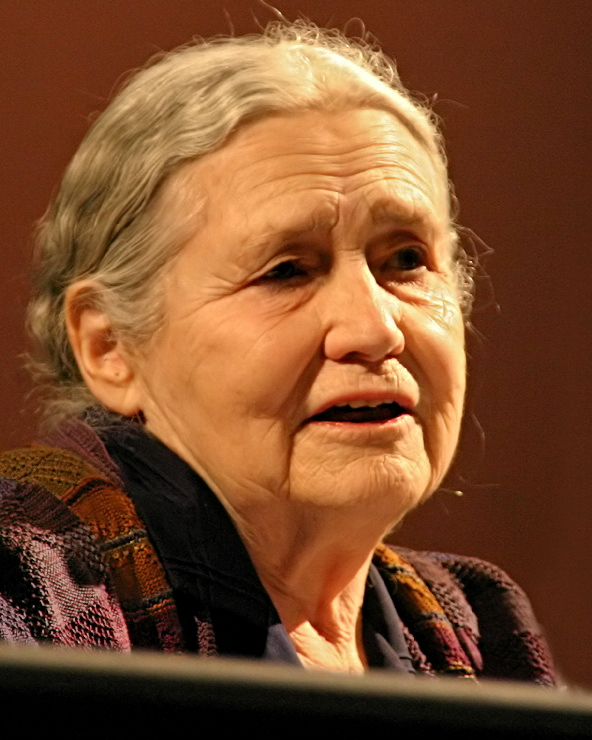
Doris Lessing speaking at a Cologne literature festival in Germany, 2006

When Lessing published Shikasta in 1979, the first book in her Canopus in Argos series, it represented a major shift of focus for the author. In her earlier books, Lessing had established a name for herself as a writer of realistic fiction; in Shikasta she introduced her readers to the spiritual and mystical themes in Sufism. In the mid-1960s Lessing had become interested in Sufism, an Islamic belief system, after reading The Sufis by Idries Shah. She described The Sufis as "the most surprising book [she] had read", stating that it "changed [her] life". Lessing later met Shah, who became "a good friend [and] teacher". In the early 1970s Lessing began writing inner space fiction, which included the novels Briefing for a Descent into Hell (1971) and Memoirs of a Survivor (1974), and in the late 1970s she turned to science fiction when she wrote Shikasta, in which she used many Sufi concepts.

Lessing said that ideas for The Marriages Between Zones Three, Four and Five had been with her for about ten years, but she "couldn't think of a way to do it". It was only when she was halfway through Shikasta that she realised that she had "created a marvelous format" that she could use for other books, and it was this format, Canopus in Argos, that made The Marriages possible. Shikasta was originally intended to be a single self-contained book, but Lessing's fictional universe developed, and she ended up writing a series of five.

Lessing's switch to science fiction was not well received by readers and critics. By the late 1970s Lessing was considered "one of the most honest, intelligent and engaged writers of the day", and Western readers unfamiliar with Sufism were dismayed that Lessing had abandoned her "rational worldview". George Stade of The New York Times complained that "our Grand Mistress of lumpen realism has gone religious on us". Reaction to the first two books in the series, Shikasta and The Marriages Between Zones Three, Four and Five, prompted Lessing to write in the Preface to the third book in the series, The Sirian Experiments (1980):

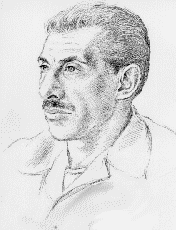
Idries Shah, who introduced Lessing to Sufism

I would so like it if reviewers and readers could see this series, Canopus in Argos: Archive, as a framework that enables me to tell (I hope) a beguiling tale or two; to put questions, both to myself and to others; to explore ideas and sociological possibilities.

Further criticism of the Canopus series followed, which included this comment by New York Times critic John Leonard: "One of the many sins for which the 20th century will be held accountable is that it has discouraged Mrs. Lessing ... She now propagandizes on behalf of our insignificance in the cosmic razzmatazz." Lessing replied by saying: "What they didn't realize was that in science fiction is some of the best social fiction of our time. I also admire the classic sort of science fiction, like Blood Music, by Greg Bear. He's a great writer." Lessing said in 1983 that she would like to write stories about red and white dwarfs, space rockets powered by anti-gravity, and charmed and coloured quarks, "[b]ut we can't all be physicists".

Lessing considered Marriages one of her better books, and said, "this book goes down into me pretty deep ... it will never happen again". In an interview published in 1996, Lessing spoke passionately of the novel:

Something happened when I wrote the book. I hit some other level. And is it a legend or a myth or a fairy tale or a fantasy? That isn't the word for what I’ve written, I think. You see, only I could have written The Golden Notebook, but I think Anon wrote this other book.

== Genre and themes ==
The Marriages Between Zones Three, Four and Five is told largely from the point of view of the matriarchal utopian Zone Three, which places the novel in the category of feminist utopias or feminist science fiction. The Canopus in Argos series in general falls under the banner of soft science fiction, or "space fiction" as Lessing called it, due to its focus on characterisation and social and cultural issues, and the de-emphasis of science and technology. Comparative literature professor Robert Alter suggested that this kind of writing belongs to a genre that literary critic Northrop Frye called the "anatomy", which is "a combination of fantasy and morality". Author Gore Vidal placed Lessing's science fiction between John Milton and L. Ron Hubbard". American screenwriter and film director Frank Pierson called Lessing's science fiction "mythic tale[s]" that are closer to Tolkien's Lord of the Rings and Herbert's Dune than works by Clarke and Asimov. British writer Graham Sleight said The Marriages comes closest to Ursula Le Guin's works in the way that both Lessing and Le Guin scrutinise societies. Sleight compared The Marriages to Le Guin's science fiction novel The Dispossessed (1974), saying that each revolves around conflicts between differing worldviews, namely the Zones in The Marriages, and Anarres and Urras in The Dispossessed.

The Marriages Between Zones Three, Four and Five differs from the other books in the Canopus in Argos series in that it reads like a fable and is set in a metaphysical, or "psychic" space, outside the rest of the series' "normal" space/time universe. The story concerns two ordained marriages that link the patriarchal and militaristic Zone Four with the matriarchal and egalitarian Zone Three, and the tribal and barbaric Zone Five. It focuses on, what Time magazine reviewer Paul Gray calls, the "struggles between men and women and the dimensions of sex and love". Literary critic Diana Sheets says that the book is about overcoming gender differences and opening up new possibilities. She argues that the premise of the story is that "cosmic order is ideally realized when men and women cross the gender divide and attempt genuine communication—sexually, emotionally ... thereby setting the preconditions for the attainment of enlightened consciousness."

The marriages were ordained by the Providers because the zones had stagnated and the birth rate of both humans and animals had fallen. Author Thelma J. Shinn says that, as in Shikasta, Lessing's "pessimistic view of human capabilities still keeps control in a benevolent power rather than in the hands of the individual". But after a push in the right direction, the individual triumphs: Al•Ith and Ben Ata initiate changes in both their own and their neighbouring zones.

Literature academic Jayne Ashleigh Glover says that while Zone Three on the surface appears to be a feminist utopia, Lessing shows that it is far from idyllic. The story narrators, the Chroniclers of Zone Three, question their zone's behaviour and attitudes, and warn of the dangers of stagnation. Al•Ith, upon returning to Zone Three, is shunned by its inhabitants for failing to attend to their zone's needs, and Zone Three's stasis manifests itself in xenophobia when Al•Ith brings back new perspectives, followed by visitors from Zone Four.

Glover sees Al•Ith, Ben Ata and Vahshi as allegories for their respective zones, and the marriages between them as marriages between the zones, as stated by the title of the book. Author Müge Galin says that Al•Ith functions according to the nature of Zone Three rather than as an individual. Galin also argues that the six zones correspond to Sufism's different levels of consciousness. Both Al•Ith and Ben Ata are able to experience other levels of consciousness when they travel to each other's zones, but Al•Ith can perceive and experience the neighbouring zone far deeper than Ben Ata because she is from a higher zone/level of consciousness. Galin says that on the "Sufi ladder to enlightenment", those on higher rungs must pull up those on lower rungs. Thus Al•Ith can only move to Zone Two after she has pulled Ben Ata up to Zone Three.

== Reception ==
Critic John Leonard, in a review in The New York Times, described The Marriages Between Zones Three, Four and Five as "a remarkable recovery" from Shikasta, which he called a "disaster". He said The Marriages works for him because it comes across as a fable, like an instructive Sufi tale. Writing in HuffPost Culture, University of Bristol academic Tom Sperlinger called the book "a legend" and listed it amongst his five recommended Lessing books that she has written since The Golden Notebook (1962). Pierson found the book "enjoyable", despite the "dry and bookish sound[ing]" dialogue which felt like a translation. He added that readers familiar with Lessing's fortitude in The Golden Notebook may not appreciate her allegory in The Marriages. While she is still "passionate, opinionated and outraged" here, Pierson said Lessing has withdrawn from writing about the real world and chosen to "soar unsteady currents of whimsy, dreams [and] mysticism".

Several reviewers were impressed with the way Lessing tackled the subject of sexual politics in the book. Paul Gray remarked in a review in Time magazine, that contrary to appearances, The Marriages is not a feminist parable, but added that while Lessing often wrote about gender conflict, she has never done it "with more sweetness, compassion and wisdom" than she has in this novel. Leonard commended Lessing for considering both sides of the gender divide and for being both critical and forgiving of Ben Ata and Al•Ith. Leonard said that Lessing had never written "a gentler book", adding, however, that her 1973 novel, Summer Before the Dark, comes a close second. A reviewer in Kirkus Reviews also complemented Lessing on her handling of sexual conflict. While the review was critical of Lessing's prose style, and called her descriptions of the Zone Four war economy "a silly cartoon sketch", it said that "there is a ... generosity about this work not quite like anything she has done".

Reviewing the novel in the Roswell Daily Record, American journalist Christopher Lehmann-Haupt called The Marriages one of Lessing's more accessible books because, in his opinion, her tendency to philosophise works better in fantasy than in other formats. Author Lucille deView was more critical of book. Writing for The Christian Science Monitor, she complained that The Marriages is not as romantic a novel as it could have been. She said that the fate of the book's mismatched lovers did not interest her and that their love came across as forced instead of passionate. What could have been an emotionally charged romance became "a calculated intellectual game". DeView also criticised Lessing's characters, saying that they "have the familiarity of childhood fairy tales with a little Walt Disney thrown in".

== Adaptations ==
The Marriages Between Zones Three, Four and Five was adapted for the opera in 1997 by composer Philip Glass with story-libretto by Lessing. It was commissioned by the state of Baden-Württemberg and HeidelbergCement in Germany. The two-act opera for orchestra, chorus and soloists had its world premier in Heidelberg, Germany in May 1997 under the direction of Thomas Kalb (music) and Birgitta Trommler (stage), with libretto translated into German by Saskia M. Wesnigk. Lessing said that for the opera she expanded her allegory about gender relations: "There was room for two festivals: a woman's festival and a marriage festival. There are a lot of lyrics not in the novel." A new production of the opera, directed by Harry Silverstein with music conducted by Robert Kaminskas, premiered for the first time in English in the United States in June 2001 at the Merle Reskin Theatre in Chicago, Illinois.

The German premiere was not well received by the press, and Chicago Tribune music critic John von Rhein found faults in the United States production. He said that the novel "falls flat as music theater", there is "no compelling dramatic narrative", and the music "drifts along innocuously". Von Rhein also complained that "score breaks no new stylistic ground, nor does it define the characters dramatically".

In 1988, Glass had adapted another book from the Canopus in Argos series, The Making of the Representative for Planet 8, into a three-act opera with story-libretto by Lessing. It was commissioned by the Houston Grand Opera, the English National Opera, the Amsterdam Music Theatre and the Kiel Opera House. The opera premiered in Houston, Texas in July 1988, and received a lukewarm review by New York Times music critic John Rockwell.

== Publication history ==
The Marriages Between Zones Three, Four and Five was first published in March 1980 in hardcover by Alfred A. Knopf in the United States, and in May 1980 by Jonathan Cape in the United Kingdom. The first paperback edition was published by Panther Books in November 1980 the United Kingdom, and in the United States by Vintage Books in August 1981. A Kindle edition was released in the United Kingdom in June 2012 by Fourth Estate. In December 1992 the five books in the Canopus series, including The Marriages, were published in a single volume entitled Canopus in Argos: Archives by Vintage Books in the United States. The Marriages Between Zones Three, Four and Five has been translated into several other languages including Dutch, French, German, Italian, Spanish, Swedish and Turkish.

== Works cited ==
- Bloom, Harold (2003). Doris Lessing. New York City: Facts on File. ISBN 978-0-7910-7441-1.
- Dixson, Barbara (1990). "Structural Complexity in Doris Lessing's Canopus Novels". Journal of the Fantastic in the Arts. 2 (3). Orlando, Florida: International Association for the Fantastic in the Arts: 14–22. JSTOR 43308052.
- Friedman, Ellen G. (1986). "Doris Lessing: Fusion and Transcendence of the Female and the 'Great Tradition'". The Centennial Review. 30 (4). Michigan State University Press: 452–470. JSTOR 23738979.
- Galin, Müge (1997). Between East and West: Sufism in the Novels of Doris Lessing. Albany, New York: State University of New York Press. ISBN 0-7914-3383-8.
- Glover, Jayne Ashleigh (2007). "A Complex and Delicate Web" (PDF). Rhodes University eResearch Repository. Archived from the original (PDF) on 16 February 2012.
- Gray, Stephen; Lessing, Doris (1986). "An Interview with Doris Lessing". Research in African Literatures. 17 (3). Indiana University Press: 329–340. JSTOR 3819219.
- Lessing, Doris (1994a) [1979]. Shikasta. London: Flamingo. ISBN 0-00-712776-6.
- Lessing, Doris (1994b) [1980]. The Marriages Between Zones Three, Four and Five. London: Flamingo. ISBN 0-00-654720-6.
- Lessing, Doris (1994c) [1980]. The Sirian Experiments. London: Flamingo. ISBN 0-00-654721-4.
- Lessing, Doris May (1996a). Putting Questions Differently: Interviews with Doris Lessing, 1964–1994. London: Flamingo. ISBN 978-0-00-654850-8.
- Pinsky, Michael (2003). Future Present: Ethics And/As Science Fiction. New Jersey: Fairleigh Dickinson University Press. ISBN 978-0-8386-3924-5.
- Rountree, Cathleen (2008). "A Thing of Temperament: An Interview with Doris Lessing, London, May 16, 1998". Jung Journal: Culture & Psyche. 2 (1). Oxfordshire: Taylor & Francis: 62–77. doi:10.1525/jung.2008.2.1.62. JSTOR 10.1525/jung.2008.2.1.62. S2CID 169216684.
- Shinn, Thelma J.; Richard, Thelma (1986). Worlds Within Women: Myth and Mythmaking in Fantastic Literature by Women. Westport, Connecticut: Greenwood Publishing Group. ISBN 9780313251016.
- Stableford, Brian (2004). Historical Dictionary of Science Fiction Literature. Lanham, Maryland: Scarecrow Press. ISBN 978-0-8108-4938-9.
- Tiger, Virginia (1993). "'The words had been right and necessary': Doris Lessing's Transformations of Utopian and Dystopian Modalities in 'The Marriages Between Zones Three, Four, and Five'". Style. 27 (1). Penn State University Press: 63–80. JSTOR 42946021.
