= The Making of the Representative for Planet 8 (opera) =

1988 opera by Philip Glass

- Opera by Philip Glass
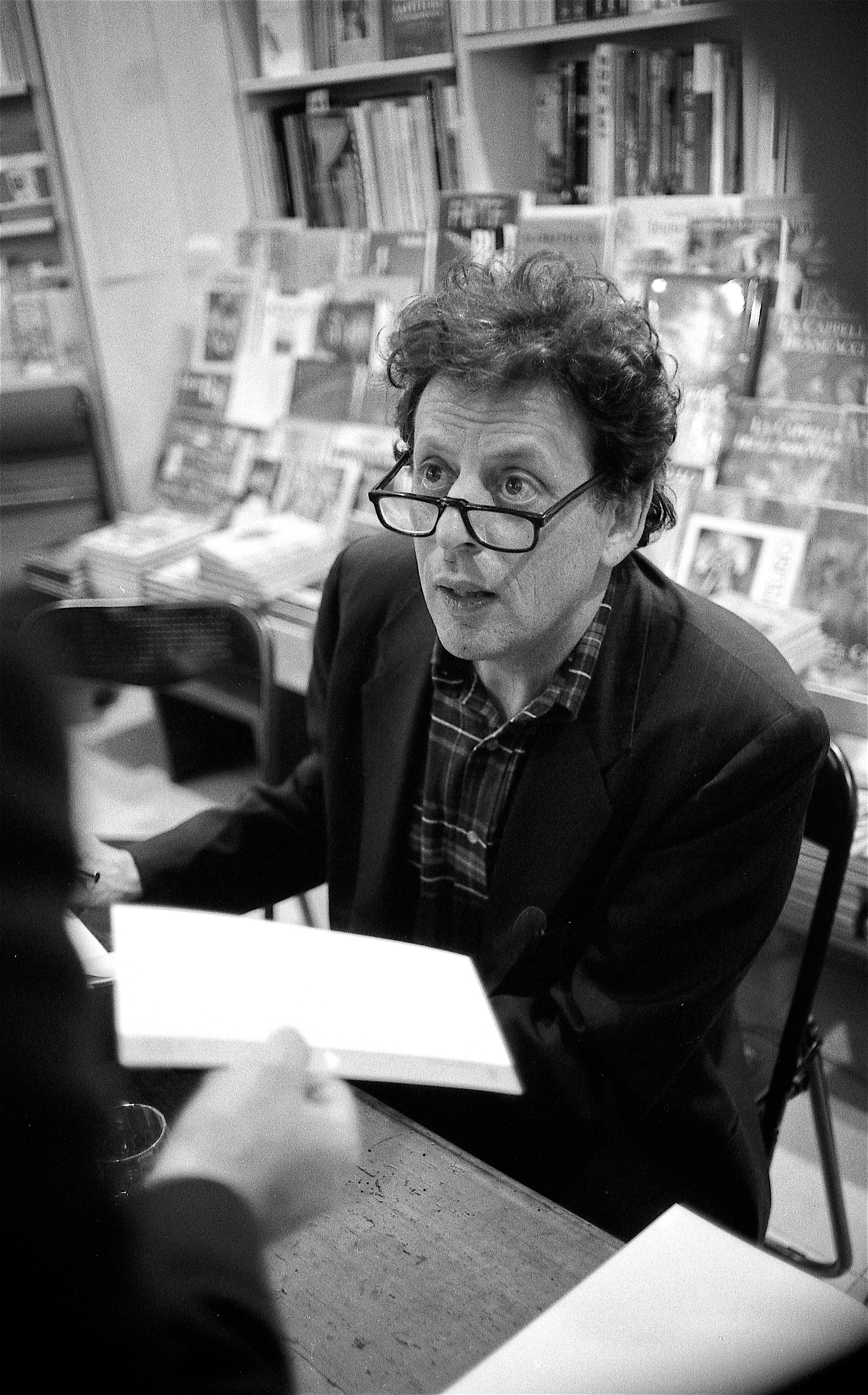
- Glass in 2006
- Librettist: Doris Lessing
- Based on: Lessing's novel of the same name
- Premiere: July 8, 1988; Houston Grand Opera

The Making of the Representative for Planet 8 is a full-scale opera by Philip Glass with a libretto by Doris Lessing based on her novel of the same name, first performed in 1988. Together with Glass's 1997 opera The Marriages Between Zones Three, Four and Five, it is part of a planned trilogy of operas based on Lessing's Canopus in Argos novels.

The opera was co-commissioned by English National Opera, Houston Grand Opera, Het Muziektheater, Amsterdam, and Theater Kiel, and co-produced with Artpark, Lewiston, New York State.

== Performance history ==
The opera was first performed at Houston Grand Opera on 8 July 1988. The British premiere was 9 November 1988 by English National Opera at the London Coliseum. This production was broadcast live in the UK on BBC Radio 3 on 13 December 1988.

== Roles ==
Role	Voice type	Houston premiere, 8 July 1988 (conductor: John DeMain)	London premiere, 9 November 1988 (conductor: Michael Lloyd)
Doeg Memory-maker and Storyteller	baritone	Harlan Foss	Andrew Shore
Johor Canopean agent	bass	Timothy Breese	Richard Angas
Alsi a young woman	soprano	Louise Edeiken	Lesley Garrett
Marl Keeper of the Herds	baritone	David Langan	Simon Masterton-Smith
Bratch Guardian of Health	mezzo-soprano	Julia Parks	Tamsin Dives
Pedug Teacher of the Young	baritone	Richard Sutliff	John Kitchiner
Rivalin Custodian of the Lake	mezzo-soprano	Patricia Shockler	Jady Pearl
Masson the Builder	tenor	Edgar Moore	Peter Bamber
Klin Tender of Fruits and Plants	soprano	Edrie Means	Gloria Crane
Nooni a young man	tenor	Jason Alexander	Christopher Gillett

== Synopsis ==
The people of Planet 8 are peaceful and content, until one of the Canopean Agents arrives and tells them to prepare for an impending ice age. The embattled population fights courageously in the face of certain death, and their efforts are transformed when they become the one single "representative" of the planet's people and culture.

== Recordings ==
Unlike many of Philip Glass's other operas, The Making of the Representative for Planet 8 has not been recorded for CD sale.
