= Mira Bartók =

American author

- Born: Myra Herr; 1959 (age 66–67); Cleveland, Ohio, USA
- Education: MFA, 1998, University of Massachusetts Amherst
- Occupation: Author
- Notable work: The Memory Palace; The Wonderling
- Spouse: Doug Plavin
- Awards: National Book Critics Circle Award for Memoir/Autobiography
- Website: mirabartok.com

Mira Bartók (née Herr; born 1959) is an American author. Her memoir The Memory Palace received the National Book Critics Circle Award for Memoir/Autobiography and her novel The Wonderling is being adapted into a film.

== Early life ==
Myra Herr was born in 1959 to mother Norma Herr. By the age of four, her father Paul Herr divorced her mother, who had begun showing signs of mental illness. As Herr grew older with her sister Rachel, Norma was diagnosed with schizophrenia and attacked her daughters consistently. By the time the girls were around 30, Herr and her sister left Norma in their hometown and changed their names and address. Under the new name of Mira Bartók, she traveled the world to Florence, Lapland, and Israel as a way to escape her mother. She painted in Florence, ran writing workshops in Israel, and earned a Fulbright Scholarship to Lapland. Until her mother's death in 2007, Bartók only communicated with her through letters sent through post office boxes.

== Education and accident ==
During the 1990s, Bartók published several children's books on ancient civilizations that focused on their culture. She later enrolled in the Master's of Fine Arts program at University of Massachusetts Amherst and graduated in 1998. The following year, she suffered a brain injury causing memory loss when her car was hit by a truck on the New York Thruway. As a result of the injury, she was unable to complete freelance work and nearly became homeless. She began applying for grants from arts foundations and she received enough funding to sustain her until she began to recover.

== Career ==
In 2007, Bartók and her sister were informed that their mother was dying of cancer and they returned to Cleveland to be with her. During the final three weeks she spent with her mother, she found a storage unit filled with her mother’s letters, journals and personal effects. Following her mother's death, Bartók began to write her memoir but had trouble with her memory due to her previous accident. While struggling to write, she read of Italian Jesuit priest Matteo Ricci who taught that one should use imagery to assist in their memory recall. Using this technique, she was able to pen her memoir that was soon published through Simon and Schuster in 2011. Her memoir, titled The Memory Palace, received the National Book Critics Circle Award for Memoir/Autobiography and was a finalist for the Goodreads Choice Awards Best Memoir & Autobiography.

While working on her second novel The Wonderling, she sold the rights to Fox 2000 Pictures to be developed into a film under director Stephen Daldry. The book revolved around the life of Number 13, a part fox, part human groundling who lives under tyrannical rule.

== Personal life ==
Bartók is married to Doug Plavin and they share a dog.
