= John Gardner (American writer) =

American novelist, essayist, and literary critic (1933–1982)

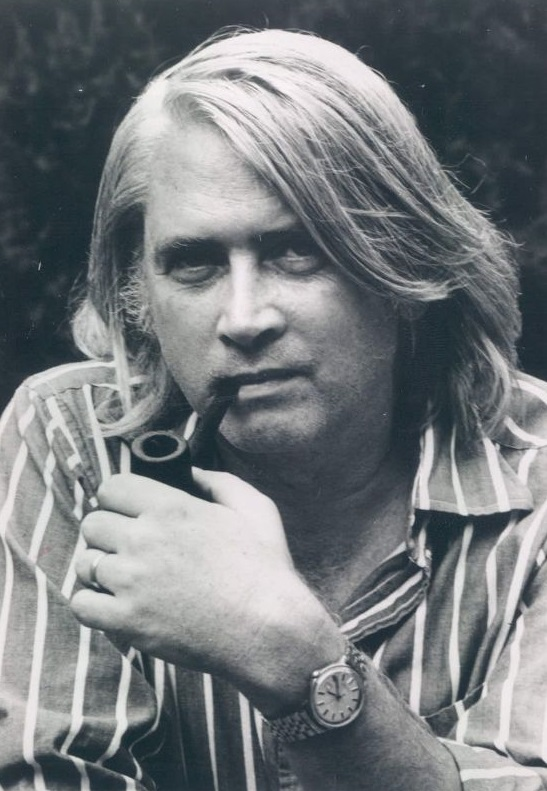
- Gardner in 1977
- Born: John Champlin Gardner Jr. July 21, 1933; Batavia, New York, U.S.
- Died: September 14, 1982 (aged 49); Susquehanna County, Pennsylvania, U.S.
- Education: Washington University in St. Louis; University of Iowa (MA, PhD)
- Occupations: Novelist; essayist; literary critic; professor
- Spouses: Joan Louise Patterson (1953–1980), Liz Rosenberg (1980–1982)
- Partner: Susan Thornton
- Writing career
- Notable works: The Sunlight Dialogues, On Moral Fiction, Grendel, Mickelsson's Ghosts

John Champlin Gardner Jr. (July 21, 1933 – September 14, 1982) was an American novelist, essayist, literary critic, and university professor, who wrote the popular 1971 novel Grendel, a retelling of the Beowulf myth from the monster's point of view.

== Early life and education ==
Gardner was born in Batavia, New York. His father was a lay preacher and dairy farmer, and his mother taught third grade at a small school in a nearby village. Both parents were fond of poetry, and would often recite their favorite poetry and poetry they wrote about life on the farm at friends' homes. Gardner was active in The Boy Scouts of America and achieved the rank of Eagle Scout. The young Gardner attended public school and worked on his father's farm.

In April 1945, his younger brother Gilbert was killed in an accident with a cultipacker. Gardner, who was driving the tractor during the fatal accident, carried guilt for his brother's death throughout his life, suffering nightmares and flashbacks. The incident informed much of Gardner's fiction and criticism — most directly in the 1977 short story "Redemption," which included a fictionalized recounting of the accident as an impetus for artistic inspiration.

Gardner began his university education at DePauw University, and received his undergraduate degree from Washington University in St. Louis in 1955. He received his MA (1956) and PhD (1958) from the University of Iowa. He was a distinguished visiting professor at the University of Detroit in 1970.

== Fiction ==
Gardner's most notable novels include The Sunlight Dialogues, about a disaffected policeman asked to engage a mentally ill man fluent in classical mythology; Grendel, a retelling of the Beowulf legend from the monster's point of view, with an existential subtext; and October Light, about an embittered brother and sister living and feuding with each other in rural Vermont (the novel includes an invented "trashy novel" that the woman reads). This last book won the National Book Critics Circle Award in 1976.

== The Life and Times of Chaucer ==
In 1977, Gardner published The Life and Times of Chaucer. In a review in the October 1977 issue of Speculum, Sumner J. Ferris pointed to several passages that were allegedly lifted either in whole or in part from work by other authors without proper citation. Ferris charitably suggested that Gardner had published the book too hastily, but on April 10, 1978, reviewer Peter Prescott, writing in Newsweek, cited the Speculum article and accused Gardner of plagiarism, a claim that Gardner met "with a sigh."

== On Moral Fiction ==
In 1978, Gardner's book of literary criticism, On Moral Fiction, sparked a controversy that excited the mainstream media, vaulting Gardner into the spotlight with an interview on The Dick Cavett Show (May 16, 1978) and a cover story in The New York Times Magazine (July, 1979). His judgments of contemporary authors—including John Updike, John Barth and other American authors—harmed his reputation among fellow writers and book reviewers. Gardner claimed that lingering animosity from critics of this book led to unflattering reviews of what turned out to be his last finished novel, Mickelsson's Ghosts, although literary critics later praised the book. Gore Vidal found On Moral Fiction, as well as Gardner's novels, sanctimonious and pedantic, and called Gardner the "late apostle to the lowbrows, a sort of Christian evangelical who saw Heaven as a paradigmatic American university."

== Teaching ==
Gardner was a life-long teacher of fiction writing. He was associated with the Bread Loaf Writers' Conference. He wrote two books on the craft of writing fiction: The Art of Fiction and On Becoming a Novelist.

Gardner inspired and, according to Raymond Carver, sometimes intimidated his students. At Chico State College (where he taught from 1959 to 1962), when Carver mentioned to Gardner that he had not liked the assigned short story, Robert Penn Warren's "Blackberry Winter," Gardner said, "You'd better read it again." "And he wasn't joking", said Carver, who related this anecdote in his foreword to Gardner's book On Becoming a Novelist. In that foreword, he makes it clear how much he respected Gardner and also relates his kindness as a writing mentor.

In addition to Chico State, Gardner taught at Oberlin College (1958–1959), San Francisco State College (1962–1965), Southern Illinois University Carbondale (1965–1974), Bennington College, and Binghamton University (1974–1982).

== Personal life ==
Gardner was a fan of motorcycle and horseback riding, resulting in several injuries throughout his life. Gardner married Joan Louise Patterson, his highschool sweetheart, on June 6, 1953; They had two children and divorced 17 years later in 1980. Shortly afterwards, Gardner married his former student, poet and novelist Liz Rosenberg in 1980; this marriage ended in divorce in 1982.

== Death ==
Gardner died in a motorcycle accident about 2 mi (3.2 km) from his home in Susquehanna County, Pennsylvania, on September 14, 1982. He was pronounced dead at Barnes-Kasson Hospital in Susquehanna. The crash was four days before his planned marriage to Susan Thornton. He was buried next to his brother Gilbert in Batavia's Grandview Cemetery.

== Works ==
=== Fiction ===
- The Resurrection. New American Library, 1966; Vintage Books, 1987, ISBN 978-0-394-73250-3
- The Wreckage of Agathon. Harper & Row, 1970; Dutton, 1985, ISBN 978-0-525-48180-5
- Grendel. New York: Vintage Books, 1971, illustrated by Emil Antonucci, ISBN 0-679-72311-0
- The Sunlight Dialogues. Knopf, 1972, ISBN 978-0-394-47144-0; reprint New Directions Publishing, 2006, ISBN 0-8112-1670-5
- Jason and Medeia. Knopf, 1973, ISBN 978-0-394-48317-7; Vintage Books, 1986, ISBN 978-0-394-74060-7 [epic narrative poem]
- Nickel Mountain: A Pastoral Novel, Knopf, 1973, ISBN 978-0-394-48883-7; reprint New Directions Publishing, 2007, ISBN 978-0-8112-1678-4
- The King's Indian. Knopf, 1974, ISBN 978-0-394-49221-6; reissue Ballantine Books, 1983, ISBN 978-0-345-30372-1 [stories]
- October Light, Knopf, 1976 ISBN 978-0-394-49912-3; reprint New Directions Publishing, 2005, ISBN 978-0-8112-1637-1
- In the Suicide Mountains. Knopf, 1977, ISBN 978-0-394-41880-3
- Vlemk the Box Painter. Lord John Press, 1979, ISBN 978-0-935716-02-3 [fairy tale]
- Frankenstein. New London Press, 1979. ISBN 978-0-896-83010-3
- Freddy's Book. Knopf, 1980, ISBN 978-0-394-50920-4; White Pine Press, 2007, ISBN 978-1-893996-84-7
- The Art of Living and Other Stories. Knopf, 1981; reprint, Vintage Books, 1989, ISBN 978-0-679-72350-9
- Mickelsson's Ghosts. Knopf, 1982, ISBN 978-0-394-50468-1; reprint New Directions Publishing, 2008, ISBN 978-0-8112-1679-1
- Stillness and Shadows. Knopf, 1986, ISBN 978-0-394-54402-1 [uncompleted novels]

=== Biography ===
- The Life and Times of Chaucer. Knopf. 1977. ISBN 978-0-394-49317-6.; reprint Barnes & Noble Publishing, 1999, ISBN 978-0-7607-1281-8

=== Poems ===
- Poems, Lord John Press, 1978
- Jason and Medeia. Knopf, 1973, ISBN 978-0-394-48317-7; Vintage Books, 1986, ISBN 978-0-394-74060-7 [epic narrative poem]

=== Children's stories ===
- Dragon, Dragon (and Other Tales). Knopf, 1975; Bantam Books, 1979, ISBN 978-0-553-15067-4
- Gudgekin The Thistle Girl (and Other Tales). Knopf, 1976, ISBN 978-0-394-83276-0
- The King of the Hummingbirds (and Other Tales). Knopf, 1977, ISBN 978-0-394-83319-4
- A Child's Bestiary. Knopf, 1977, ISBN 978-0-394-83483-2

=== Criticism and Instruction ===
- The Forms of Fiction (1962) (with Lennis Dunlap) Random House, anthology of short stories
- The Construction of the Wakefield Cycle (1974)
- The Poetry of Chaucer (1977)
- On Moral Fiction, Basic Books, 1978, ISBN 978-0-465-05226-4
- On Becoming a Novelist (1983)
- The Art of Fiction (1983)
- On Writers and Writing (1994) ISBN 978-0-201-62672-8; reprint Westview Press, 1995, ISBN 978-0-201-48338-3

=== Translation ===
- The Complete Works of the Gawain Poet (1965)
- The Alliterative Morte Arthure and Other Middle English Poems (1971)
- Tengu Child (with Nobuko Tsukui) (1983)
- Gilgamesh (with John Maier, Richard A. Henshaw) (1984)
